= Cabinet of the First Republic of Guinea =

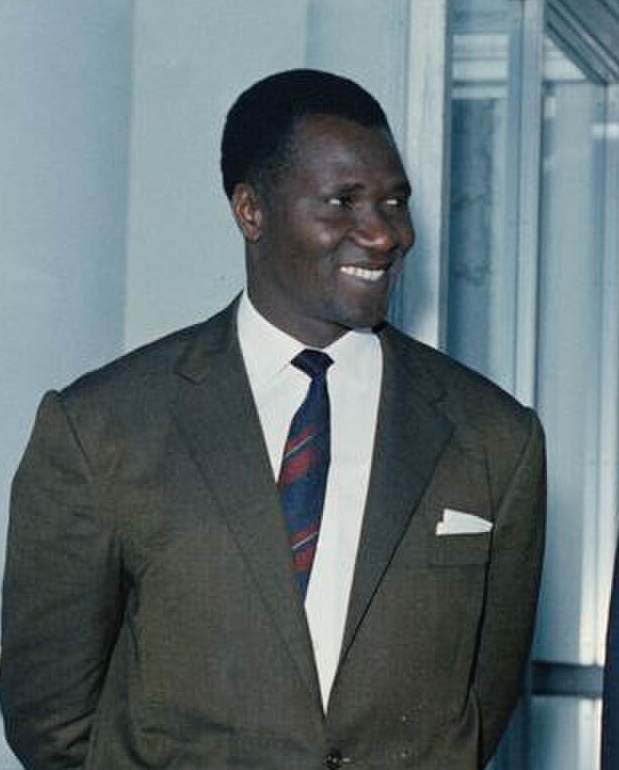
Ahmed Sekou in the white house in 1962

The Cabinet of the First Republic of Guinea (French: Cabinet de la Première République de Guinée) was the governing body of Guinea under the rule of President Ahmed Sékou Touré, from independence on 28 September 1958 until the death of Touré on 26 March 1984, followed by a bloodless coup by Colonel Lansana Conté on 3 April 1984. For much of that time, the country was run by a tight-knit inner group, many of them relatives of Sékou Touré, who became the primary beneficiaries of the regime.

== 1957 transitional council ==
The council during the transition to independence, announced on 9 May 1957, had the following members:

Name	Background	Function
Jean Ramadier	Governor of the FOM	President of the Council
Sékou Touré	Deputy mayor of Conakry	Vice-president
Najib Roger Accar	Doctor	Minister of health
Fodéba Keïta	Artist	Minister of the Interior
Alioune Drame	Economist	Minister of Finance
Damantang Camara	Teacher	Minister of Public Affairs
Ismaël Touré		Minister of TP
Abdourahamane Diallo	Doctor	Minister of Cooperation
Bengaly Camara	Teacher	Minister of Labor and Social Affairs
Jean Eugene Mignard		Minister of Production
Faraban Camara	Inspector	Minister of Education (1st and 2nd level)
Michel Collet		Minister of Technical Education
Louis Lansana Beavogui	Doctor	Minister of Commerce, Industry and Mines

== 1958 first council ==
The first council after independence, announced on 10 November 1958, had the following members:

Name	Function
Sekou Touré	President, Foreign Affairs and Defense
Barry III	Secretary of State
Fodé Cissé	Secretary of State to Presidency
N'Famara Kéita	Secretary of State to Presidency
Alioune Dramé	Minister of Finance to Presidency
Ousmane Baldet	Secretary of State, Customs and Treasury
Fodébe Kéita	Minister of the Interior, Security
Alassane Diop	Secretary of State, Information
Damantan Camara	Minister of Justice
Ismael Touré	Minister of TP, PTT, Transport
Louis Lansana Béavogui	Minister of Economic Affairs & Planning
Abdourahmane Diallo	Minister of Rural Economy
Barry Diawadou	Minister of Education
Michel Collet	Minister of Technical Training
Acar Rojer Najib	Minister oh Health
Camara Bangaly	Minister of Labor and Social Affairs

== 1963 Council ==
The 1963 council, announced on 1 January 1963, included the following members:

Name	Function
Saifoulaye Diallo	Minister of State of Justice
Balla Camara	Secretary of State
Louis Lansana Beavogui	Minister of Foreign Affairs
Fodéba Keïta	Minister of National Defense
Ismaël Touré	Minister of Economy, TP, Industry, Energy and Uranism (?)
Fode Cisse	Secretary of the Environment
Abdourahamane Diallo	Minister of Health and Social Affairs
Loffo Camara	Secretary of State for Social Affairs
Moussa Diakité	Minister of Finance
N'Famara Keïta	Minister of Trade
Ibrahima Sory Barry	Minister of Rural Economy
Barry III	Minister of Planning
Saidou Conte	Minister of National Education and Youth
Fode Mamoudou Touré	Minister of Public Affairs
Alhassane Diop	Minister of PT, Information and Tourism
Alpha Amadou Diallo	Secretary of State for Information
Najib Roger Accar	Minister of Transport

== 1964 shuffle ==
On 1 February 1964 some ministers changed jobs:

Name	Function
Saifoulaye Diallo	Minister of State for Finance & Planning
Moussa Diakité	Minister of Justice
Barry III	Minister of Commerce
N'Famara Keïta	Vice-president
Balla Camara	Minister of Finance & Administration

== 1964 government ==
On 8 November 1964 the positions were announced as:

Name	Function
Ahmed Sekou Touré	President and Head of State
Naby Youla	Secretary of State, Information and Tourism
Toumani Sangare	Secretary of State, Justice
Saifoulaye Diallo	Minister of State, Finance and Planning
Ousmane Baldé	Secretary of State and Minister of State
Ismaël Touré	Minister of Economic Development
Louis Lansana Beavogui	Foreign Affairs
Karim Fofana	Sectretary for Economic Development
Moussa Diakité	Minister of Trade and Banking
Fodéba Keïta	Minister of Defense and Security
Moriba Magassouba	Secretary of State for National Defense and Security
Balla Camara	Minister of Internal Trade
Fode Mamoudou Toure	Minister of Public Affairs and Labor
Oumar Deen Camara	Secretary of State for Labor
Saidou Conte	Minister of Education
Alhassane Diop	Minister of Posts and Telecommunications
Sori Barry	Minister of Rural Economy
Najib Roger Accar	Minister of Transport
Alpha Amadou Diallo	Minister of Health and Social Affairs
Loffo Camara	Secretary of State for Social Affairs
Abdourahamane Diallo	Minister for Kankan
Lansana Diané	Minister for Labé
N'Famara Keita	Minister for Macenta
Mamadi Kaba	Minister for Kindia

== 1965 shuffle ==
There was a minor shuffle on 17 November 1965, with the following assignments:

Name	Function
General Lansana Diané	Minister of the People's Army and Civil Service
Fodéba Keïta	Minister of Rural Economy and Artisans
Sory Barry	Minister of Labor and Social Laws
Moriba Magassouba	Secretary of State for the Interior and Security
Damantang Camara	Minister for Labé

== 1968 cabinet ==
A new cabinet was announced on 19 January 1968:

Name	Background	Function
Saifoulaye Diallo	Politburo member	Minister of Finance and Banking
Ousmane Balde	Copywriter	Secretary of State, Finance
Louis Lansana Beavogui	Politburo member	Minister of External Affairs
Alpha Amadou Diallo	Magistrate	Secretary of State, Foreign Affairs
Ismaël Touré	Politburo Member	Minister of Economic Development, Agriculture, Industry and Mines
Karim Fofana	Engineer	Secretary of State, Public Works
Fodeba Keita	Teacher	Secretary of State, Agriculture
N'Famara Keita	Politburo member	Minister of Commerce, Transport, Posts and Telecommunications
Alhassane Diop	Engineer	Secretary of State, Transport
Sory Barry	Engineer	Secretary of State, P & T
Mamouna Touré	Politburo member	Minister of Social Services, Health, Education, Youth, Labor
Tibou Tounkara	Teacher	Secretary of State, Education
Moriba Magassouba		Secretary of State, Labor
Loffo Camara	Politburo member	Secretary of State, Social Affairs
General Lansana Diané	Politburo member	Minister of the People's Army and Civil Service
Abdourahamane Diallo	Politburo member	Secretary of State without portfolio
Alpha Amadou Diallo		Secretary of State for Information
Mathos Marcel	Teacher	Secretary of State, Interior
Fodé Mamoudou Touré	Magistrate	Secretary of State, Justice
Moussa Diakité	Politburo member	Minister for Forest Region
Mamadi Kaba	Politburo member	Minister for Haute Guineé
Toumani Sangaré	Teacher	Minister for Moyenne Guineé
Damantang Camara	Magistrate, Politburo member	Minister for Maritime Guinea

== 1962–1969 votes received ==
The National Political Bureau originally consisted of 17 members elected every three years in congress. The members between 31 December 1962 and 17 September 1969, by number of votes obtained, were:

- Sekou Touré
- Diallo Saüfoulaye
- Camara Loffo
- Bangoura Mafory
- Louis Lansana Beavogui
- Ismaël Touré
- Moussa Diakité
- Keita Nfamara
- Lansana Diané
- Abdourahmane Diallo
- Jean Tounkara Faragué
- Mamadou Fofana
- Camara Damantang
- Mamady Kaba
- Camara Bengaly
- Leo Maka
- Daouda Camara

Further changes occurred in 1969, and following the attempted coup in 1970.

== 1972 cabinet ==
In 1972, Mamadi Keïta was leader of the left-wing faction in the Politburo, engaged in a struggle with Ismaël Touré to be recognized as the next in line to succeed the president, Sékou Touré. At the 9th party congress that year, the right-center took control. Sékou Touré remained president and Lansana Beavogui was given the newly created title of Prime Minister. Ismaël Touré gained the powerful position of Minister of the Economy and Finance, while Mamadi Keïta was relegated to Minister of Culture and Education. His brother Seydou Keïta became ambassador to Western Europe.

A partial list of cabinet members:

Name	Background	Function
Sékou Touré	Politburo member	President
Lansana Beavogui	Politburo member	Prime Minister
Ismaël Touré	Politburo member	Minister of the Economy and Finance
Mamadi Keïta	Politburo member	Minister of Culture and Education
Moussa Diakité	Politburo member	Minister of the Interior and Security
N'Famara Keïta		Minister of Social Affairs
Fily Cissoko		Minister of Foreign Affairs
Alpha Oumar Barry	Politburo member	Minister of Exchanges
Abdoulaye Touré	Central committee member	Minister of External Trade
Aboubacar Kouyaté		Minister of Internal Trade
Mamadi Kaba		Minister of Transport
Mamoudou Salifou Touré		Minister of Posts and Telecommunications
Laminy Condé		Minister of Industry and Energy
Mamoudou Bela Doumbouya	Politburo member	Minister of Finance
Mohamed Lamine Touré		Minister of Mines
Mara Dyoumba		Minister of Public Works, Urbanization and Environment
Alpha Bacar Barry		Ministry of Land Planning
Lansana Diané	Politburo member	Party Inspector General

In May 1972, the members of the National Politbureau who welcomed Fidel Castro of Cuba on his visit to Guinea were:

- Ahmed Sékou Touré, President
- Lansana Beavogui, prime minister
- Ismaël Touré, minister of finance and economic affairs
- Mamadi Keïta minister of education
- Moussa Diakité, minister of the interior and security
- N'Famara Keïta, minister of social affairs
- Lansana Diane permanent secretary of the National Political Bureau

== 1979 cabinet ==
The final cabinet reorganization in the first republic was announced on 1 June 1979:

Name	Function
Lansana Beavogui	Prime Minister
Moussa Diakité	Minister of Environment and Urbanization
N'Famara Keïta	Minister of Energy and for Konkouré
Saifoulaye Diallo	Minister of Public Health
Ismaël Touré	Minister of Mines
Mamadi Keita	Minister of Science & Technology
Abdoulaye Touré	Minister of External Affairs
Mouctar Diallo	Minister of the Interior
Sékou Chérif	Minister of the Interior
Diao Baldé	Minister of Internal Trade
Lansana Diané	Minister of the People's Army
Toumani Sangaré	Minister of Posts and Telecommunications
Jeanne-Martin Cissé	Minister of Social Affairs
Sénaïnon Béhanzin	Minister of Information
Fily Cissoko	Minister of Youth, Sports and Arts
Fodé Mamoudou Touré	Minister of Finance
Mamadi Kaba	Minister of Industry
Alafé Kourouma	Minister of Agriculture, Water and Forests
Mamadou SY	Minister of Labor
Mamadou Bah	Minister of Fisheries
Abraham Kabassan Keita	Minister of Public Works
Siké Camra	Minister of Justice
Momory Camara	Minister of External Trade
Boubacar Diallo	Minister of State Control
Galéma Guilavogui	Minister of pre-University Education
Saïkou Barry	Minister of Banking
Soriba Touré	Minister of Economic Affairs
N'Fanly Sangaré	Minister delegate to Brussels
Fodé Soriba Camara	Minister for Islamic Affairs
Sékou Kaba	Secretary General to Presidency
Mamadou Salifou Touré	Secretary General to Government

== Key cabinet members ==
Key members, their posts and relationship with the president were:

Member	Posts held	Relationship to Sékou Touré
Lansana Beavogui	Minister of Economic Affairs and Planning (1958–1961); Minister of Foreign Affairs (1961 – May 1969); Minister of Economic Affairs (May 1969 – 1972); Prime Minister (1972 – April 1984)	
Ismaël Touré	Minister of Public Works (1957 – January 1963); Minister of Economic Development (January 1963 – May 1969); Minister of Economy and Finance (1972 – March 1984)	Half brother
Mamadi Keïta	Minister of education	Wife's half-brother
Moussa Diakité	Minister of Security and internal affairs Minister of Economy and Finance; Minister of Housing	Married to sister of Touré's wife
Nfamara Keita	Minister of social affairs	
Lansana Diane	Permanent secretary	
