= Human rights in Guinea =

Human rights in Guinea, a nation of approximately 10,069,000 people in West Africa, are a contentious issue. In its 2012 Freedom in the World report, Freedom House named Guinea "partly free" for the second year in a row, an improvement over its former status as one of the least free countries in Africa.

The United States Bureau of Democracy, Human Rights and Labor, which produces annual human rights reports on the country, claims the most pressing human rights issues are the use of torture by security forces, and abuse of women and children through such acts as female genital mutilation.

== Historical and political situation ==
Guinea gained its independence from France in 1958. Alpha Condé won the 2010 presidential election and in December 2010 become the country's first democratically elected president. The following chart shows Guinea's ratings since 1972 in the Freedom in the World reports, published annually by Freedom House. A rating of 1 is "free"; 7, "not free".^{1}

Historical ratings

Year	Political Rights	Civil Liberties	Status	Head of State^{2}
1972	7	7	Not Free	Ahmed Sékou Touré
1973	7	7	Not Free	Ahmed Sékou Touré
1974	7	7	Not Free	Ahmed Sékou Touré
1975	7	7	Not Free	Ahmed Sékou Touré
1976	7	7	Not Free	Ahmed Sékou Touré
1977	7	7	Not Free	Ahmed Sékou Touré
1978	7	7	Not Free	Ahmed Sékou Touré
1979	7	7	Not Free	Ahmed Sékou Touré
1980	7	7	Not Free	Ahmed Sékou Touré
1981	7	7	Not Free	Ahmed Sékou Touré
1982^{3}	7	7	Not Free	Ahmed Sékou Touré
1983	7	7	Not Free	Ahmed Sékou Touré
1984	7	5	Not Free	Ahmed Sékou Touré
1985	7	5	Not Free	Lansana Conté
1986	7	5	Not Free	Lansana Conté
1987	7	6	Not Free	Lansana Conté
1988	7	6	Not Free	Lansana Conté
1989	7	6	Not Free	Lansana Conté
1990	6	5	Not Free	Lansana Conté
1991	6	5	Not Free	Lansana Conté
1992	6	5	Partly Free	Lansana Conté
1993	6	5	Not Free	Lansana Conté
1994	6	5	Not Free	Lansana Conté
1995	6	5	Not Free	Lansana Conté
1996	6	5	Not Free	Lansana Conté
1997	6	5	Not Free	Lansana Conté
1998	6	5	Not Free	Lansana Conté
1999	6	5	Not Free	Lansana Conté
2000	6	5	Not Free	Lansana Conté
2001	6	5	Not Free	Lansana Conté
2002	6	5	Not Free	Lansana Conté
2003	6	5	Not Free	Lansana Conté
2004	6	5	Not Free	Lansana Conté
2005	6	5	Not Free	Lansana Conté
2006	6	5	Not Free	Lansana Conté
2007	6	5	Not Free	Lansana Conté
2008	7	5	Not Free	Moussa Dadis Camara
2009	7	6	Not Free	Sékouba Konaté
2010	5	5	Partly Free	Alpha Conde
2011	5	5	Partly Free	Alpha Condé
2012	5	5	Partly Free	Alpha Condé
2013	5	5	Partly Free	Alpha Condé
2014	5	5	Partly Free	Alpha Condé
2015	5	5	Partly Free	Alpha Condé
2016	5	5	Partly Free	Alpha Condé
2017	5	5	Partly Free	Alpha Condé
2018	5	4	Partly Free	Alpha Condé
2019	5	5	Partly Free	Alpha Condé
2020	5	5	Partly Free	Alpha Condé
2021	6	5	Not Free	Mamady Doumbouya
2022	6	5	Not Free	Mamady Doumbouya
2023	6	5	Not Free	Mamady Doumbouya

=== Sekou Touré regime (1954–1984) ===
Amnesty International was claiming Guinea contained prisoners of conscience as early as their 1969 report. In 1968 over one hundred people were arrested, and 13 sentenced to the death penalty, for their roles in an alleged plot against the government. Included in those arrested were cabinet ministers and high-level military officers. After the 1970 Portuguese invasion of the capital, the government stepped up its campaign against political opposition and by the end of the year at least 85 people had reportedly been sentenced to death. Thousands had been arrested, including 22 Europeans, Germans, French, and Italians among them.

In December 1970 the Archbishop of Conakry, Raymond-Marie Tchidimbo, was sentenced to hard labour for refusing to read government documents from the pulpit calling on Christians to support the government against foreign imperialism. He and at least a thousand other political prisoners remained detained in 1977. A report published in June 1977 by the International League for Human Rights estimated the number of political prisoners at over 3000, alleging prisoners were subject to starvation, torture, murder, and arbitrary execution. The most notorious prison was Camp Boiro, which included amongst its prisoners Diallo Telli.

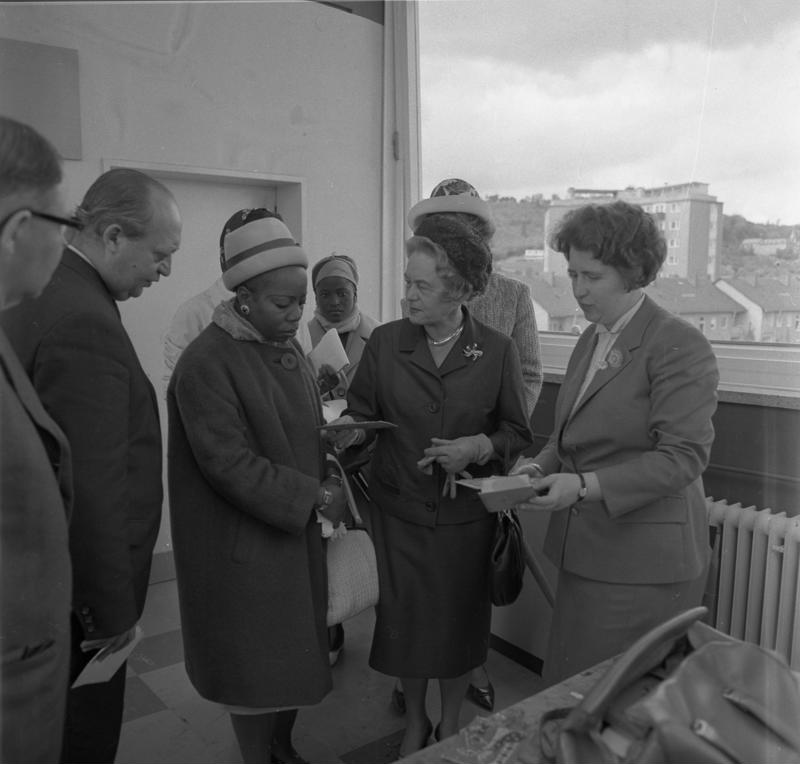
Loffo Camara, a former cabinet minister who was shot on 25 January 1971.

After severe criticism of its human rights situation, and the withholding of aid by the United States under the Food for Peace Act, the government attempted a rapprochement strategy with its neighbours and the West, and claimed to be improving its internal situation. In August and October 1977, however, the government fired upon a series of economic protests and killed an unknown number of women. They then began to round up those thought responsible. By 1978 reports were estimating the number of political prisoners had grown to 4000.

In late 1978 President Sékou Touré proclaimed to journalists that all prisoners who had been sentenced to execution at Boiro were now dead. He went on to explain that Amnesty International was "trash". By 1979 reports were claiming fewer than 20 of the original arrestees were still being held at Boiro. Hundreds who had been arrested never reappeared, however, and some sources put the number dead at over 4000. Arrests continued, however.

A May 1980 grenade attack on the Palais du Peuple and a February 1981 bomb explosion at Conakry Airport precipitated two more waves of politically motivated arrests, with hundreds detained and reports of death. People continued to be killed at Boiro through what was known as the "black diet" – a complete lack of food and water. The Guinean government also reached agreements with the governments of Liberia and Côte d'Ivoire to forcibly repatriate expatriates involved in opposition activity. Reports of detainment and beatings upon their arrival leaked to the outside world.

In September 1982, Touré held a news conference proudly proclaiming that there were no more political prisoners being held in the country. He could not explain the fate of approximately 2900 people arrested since 1969 who remained unaccounted for. Reports of the number of prisoners at Boiro continued to range from several hundred to thousands. Torture methods reportedly used at the prison included bondage, forced burning with cigarettes, and electric shocks applied to the head and genitals. After Touré's death in March 1984, major political changes were afoot.

=== Lansana Conté regime (1984–2008) ===
On 3 April 1984 the military took control of the country, suspended the constitution, dissolved the ruling Parti Démocratique de Guinée, and launched the Military Committee for National Redress to run the nation under Lansana Conté. In their first public statement the new rulers claimed they would treat human rights as a priority and named those who had "lost their lives simply because they wanted to express their opinions on the country's future" as martyrs. Camp Boiro was closed and all political prisoners immediately released. Following the death of a criminal suspect in police custody in September 1984, protests erupted in Kamsar and 200 people were arrested.

A coup d'état was announced six hours following Conté's death on 22 December 2008. On 27 September 2009, the day before planned demonstrations Conakry, the government declared demonstrations illegal. Thousands of protestors defied the ban, assembling in a soccer stadium. 157 were left dead after the level of violence used by security forces escalated.

Human Rights organizations demanded justice for the killing of more than 150 peaceful demonstrators by Guinean security forces on September 28, 2009, in a stadium. The domestic investigation begun in February 2010 and concluded in 2017, where 13 suspects were charged and 11 were sent for trial. However, some of the suspects continued being in an influential position. The trial was last scheduled for July, but no progress was made in the case. Association of Victims, Relatives and Friends of September 28, 2009 (AVIPA), Equal Rights for All (MDT), the Guinean Human Rights Organization (OGDH), the International Federation for Human Rights, Amnesty International, and Human Rights Watch have made the call of justice.

== Current issues (2010–present) ==
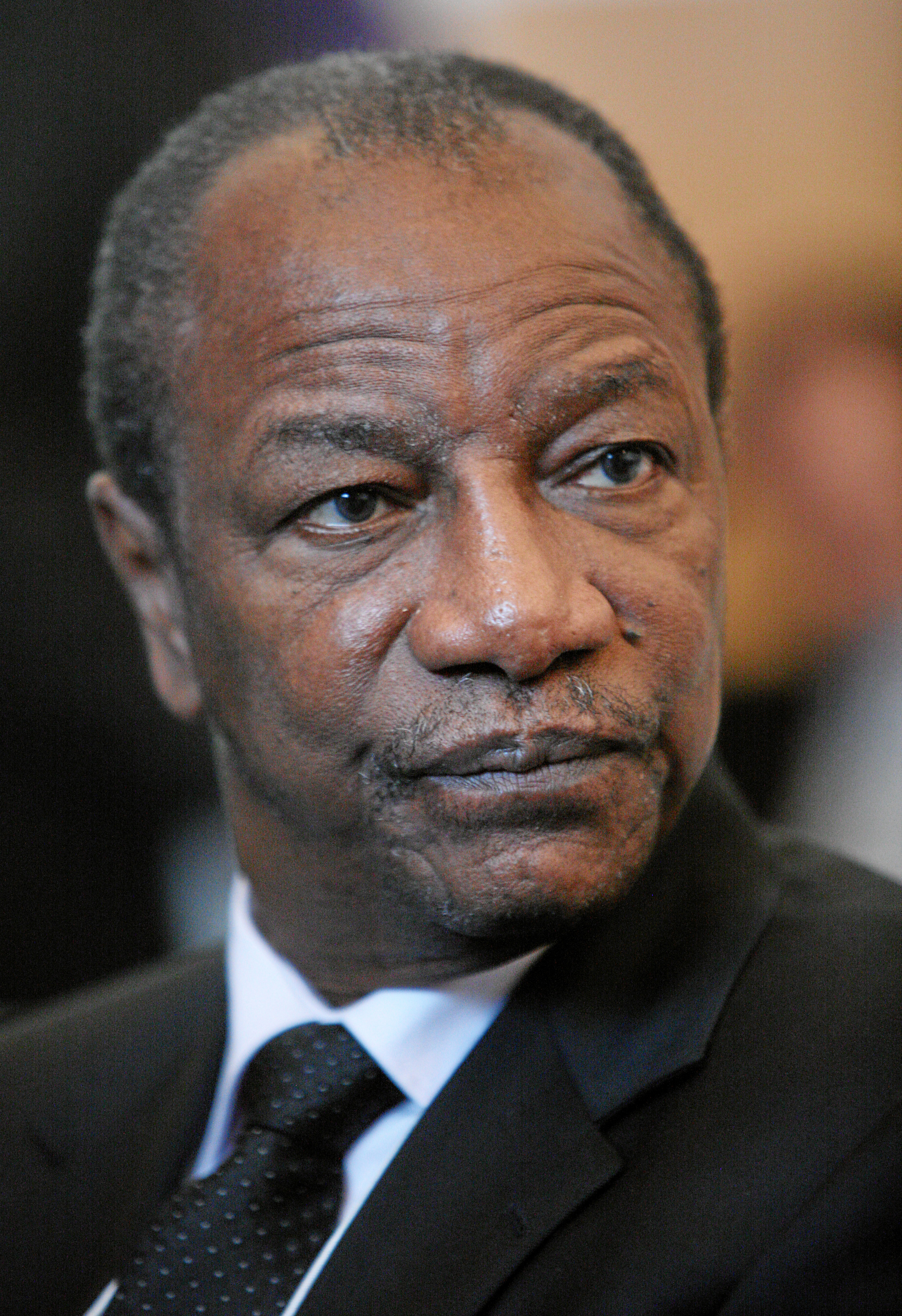
Despite president Alpha Condé's assertion that the death penalty does not exist in Guinea, sixteen people were given that sentence in 2011.

=== Legal system ===
Sixteen people were sentenced to death in 2011, which is apparently at odds with President Condé's assertion that Guinea is abolitionist.

==== Arbitrary arrest and torture ====
While the constitution prohibits arbitrary arrest and detention, its practice is quite common. Prisoners are beaten and raped by police. Action by Christians for the Abolition of Torture alleges that four youths accused of stealing were tortured by police in 2011. Abuses at the Kassa Island military prison in 2009 reportedly included castration. Amnesty has two reports of the use of torture in 2011: in February a man in Mamou was taken to the local police station after setting up roadblocks and beaten while handcuffed. In April a man was arrested in Dixinn and beaten at a local station.

Torture is used by "judicial police officers" to coerce confessions from detainees.

On 19 February 2025, the national coordinator of the Forum of the social forces of Guinea, Abdoul Sacko, was kidnapped and tortured. In June 2025, the Lawyer's Order of Guinea boycotted hearings for two weeks and their members left national institutions in which they served in reaction to the kidnapping and torture of Mohamed Traoré, the Order's ex-bâtonnier and a critic of Doumbouya.

=== Women's rights ===
Women do not have equal legal status as men, including in inheritance, property, employment, credit, and divorce. Women receive different pay for similar work. Women cannot be employed in professions deemed hazardous. Laws prohibiting hiring discrimination against women are not effectively enforced. Divorce laws generally favor men. Testimony given by women carries less weight than testimony given by men

Despite governmental efforts to promote women's rights, acts of discrimination, sexual violence and domestic violence against women are widespread in Guinea. Human Rights Watch claims that thousands of young girls working as housekeepers are raped by their employers.

Female genital mutilation is widespread despite being outlawed by Act No. L10/AN/2000.Indeed, the law is not effectively enforced. In 2018, ~95% of polled women aged 15 to 49 had undergone the procedure. The Guinean government is taking measures to combat female genital multilation. In 2023, 105 communities pledged to end female genital mutilation. In 2024, 236 new villages committed to abandoning female genital mutilation

=== Childs' rights ===
The legal age of marriage is 18, and child marriage is criminalized. However, customary child marriages with parental consent are mentioned in law. Child marriage is relatively common : around 13% of all children and 22% of girls aged 12 to 17 are married. UNICEF and others provided programs to end child marriage. In 2024, 8285 girls aged 10-19 received prevention and support services. In 2023, 105 communities pledged to end child marriage.

Child labor is illegal in the formal sector. The minimum legal working age is 16 years old, but children as young as 12 years old can work as apprentices with light work. Children are prohibited from hazardous work.

However, child labor is not illegal within the informal sector of the economy, not all hazardous occupations are prohibited and conditions in which light work may be done are not specified. Enforcement of child labor law is also limited to large firms. As a result, the worst forms of child labor remain. Large numbers of children are exploited in economic activities, including in hazardous conditions. Notably, child labor remained frequent in artisanal mining operations of Basse-Guinée. Forced child labor occurred primarily in the cashew, cocoa, coffee, gold, and diamond sectors of the economy.

Child abuse is widespread and open. It is generally ignored by families or dealt with at the community level. Offenders are rarely persecuted.

Child trafficking and child pornography are illegal. These laws are not regularly enforced.

=== Sexual and gender minorities' rights ===
Homosexual sexual activity is criminalized by article 274 of the Penal Code. Sexual minorities have unequal access to education, employment and housing due to prejudice and discrimination.

LGBTQ persons face arbitrary arrest, violence, and harassment by security forces. The Office for the Protection of Women, Children, and Morals has a unit dedicated to investigating morals offenses, including same-sex sexual activities. The junta has carried frequent raids on places where LGBT individuals congregate. Many such places were shut down in 2021.

There are cultural and religious taboos and stigma against sexual and gender minorities. LGBTQ persons are subjected to physical and mental abuse in their families, in their community and online; notably, sexual assault. LGBTQ individuals report bullying by peers and teachers, and often are not able to finish their studies. They are often forced into heterosexual marriages by family

LGBTQ individuals are targeted by abusers in jail. Transgender individuals are subject to "compassionate incarceration" under the pretext of protection from community violence, but are placed in prison according to their gender at birth, thus leading to high rates of sexual violence; particularly, women held in male-only facilities.

Groups representing the LGBTQ+ community were unable to obtain legal recognition despite there being no law to prevent their recognition.

=== Minority rights ===
Although 50 people were arrested for rape in 2011, no prosecutions were made. A 2003 study revealed that more than 20% of women at a local hospital were there for sexual violence. The situation is reported to remain unchanged, and more than half of rape victims are girls between 11 and 15 years. Many rapes occur at school.

Guinea is ethnically diverse, and people tend to identify strongly with their ethnic group. Racial rhetoric during political campaigns resulted in the deaths of at least two people in 2011.

=== Disabled peoples' rights ===
In 2021, there were around 155,900 people with disabilities in Guinea. The law prohibits discrimination against persons based on disabilities in education, employment, air travel and other transportation, access to health care, or the provision of other government services.

There are laws describing the rights of disabled persons (access to school, quotas in government hiring...), but they are not effectively enforced. Persons with disabilities could in some cases have equal access to education, health services, public buildings, and transportation.

=== Albinos' rights ===
Discrimination against persons with albinism occurs, particularly in the Forested Guinea Region, where they were historically sought for witchcraft purposes and sacrifices. A May 2021 law guaranteed albinos an equal access to education, health care, mobility, and employment. Penalties were also strengthened penalties for those forcing albinos to beg and seeking to use them in ritual ceremonies.

People with albinism are not legally protected from discrimination in Guinea.

=== Freedom of speech ===
==== Media and censorship ====
Media freedom is guaranteed by the constitution. Journalists critical of the government are, however, reportedly harassed and arrested by security forces.

=== Freedom of religion ===
Religious rights are generally respected, though it is claimed non-Muslims are discriminated against in the allocation of government employment. Restrictions exist on Muslims' freedom to convert to other religions.

Christians face discrimination in Guinea. Converts are threatened and harassed if they do not renounce their faith. Churches have been attacked and destroyed as a result of political unrest.

== International treaties ==
Guinea's stances on international human rights treaties are as follows:

International treaties
Treaty	Organization	Introduced	Signed	Ratified
Convention on the Prevention and Punishment of the Crime of Genocide	United Nations	1948	–	2000
International Convention on the Elimination of All Forms of Racial Discrimination	United Nations	1966	1966	1977
International Covenant on Economic, Social and Cultural Rights	United Nations	1966	1967	1978
International Covenant on Civil and Political Rights	United Nations	1966	1967	1978
First Optional Protocol to the International Covenant on Civil and Political Rights	United Nations	1966	1975	1993
Convention on the Non-Applicability of Statutory Limitations to War Crimes and Crimes Against Humanity	United Nations	1968	–	1971
International Convention on the Suppression and Punishment of the Crime of Apartheid	United Nations	1973	1974	1975
Convention on the Elimination of All Forms of Discrimination against Women	United Nations	1979	1980	1982
Convention against Torture and Other Cruel, Inhuman or Degrading Treatment or Punishment	United Nations	1984	1986	1989
Convention on the Rights of the Child	United Nations	1989	–	1990
Second Optional Protocol to the International Covenant on Civil and Political Rights, aiming at the abolition of the death penalty	United Nations	1989	–	–
International Convention on the Protection of the Rights of All Migrant Workers and Members of Their Families	United Nations	1990	–	2000
Optional Protocol to the Convention on the Elimination of All Forms of Discrimination against Women	United Nations	1999	–	–
Optional Protocol to the Convention on the Rights of the Child on the Involvement of Children in Armed Conflict	United Nations	2000	–	–
Optional Protocol to the Convention on the Rights of the Child on the Sale of Children, Child Prostitution and Child Pornography	United Nations	2000	–	2011
Convention on the Rights of Persons with Disabilities	United Nations	2006	2007	2008
Optional Protocol to the Convention on the Rights of Persons with Disabilities	United Nations	2006	2007	2008
International Convention for the Protection of All Persons from Enforced Disappearance	United Nations	2006	–	–
Optional Protocol to the International Covenant on Economic, Social and Cultural Rights	United Nations	2008	–	–
Optional Protocol to the Convention on the Rights of the Child on a Communications Procedure	United Nations	2011	–	–

== See also ==
- Human trafficking in Guinea
- Internet censorship and surveillance in Guinea

== Notes ==
1.Note that the "Year" signifies the "Year covered". Therefore the information for the year marked 2008 is from the report published in 2009, and so on.
2.As of 1 January.
3.The 1982 report covers the year 1981 and the first half of 1982, and the following 1984 report covers the second half of 1982 and the whole of 1983. In the interest of simplicity, these two aberrant "year and a half" reports have been split into three year-long reports through interpolation.
