= Boubacar Diallo =

Boubacar Diallo may refer to:

- Boubacar Diallo (filmmaker), Burkinabé filmmaker and writer
- Boubacar Biro Diallo (1922–2025), Guinean politician
- Boubacar Telli Diallo (1926–1976), Guinean Minister of Justice, magistrate and lawyer
- Boubacar Yacine Diallo (born 1955), Guinean journalist, writer and government minister
- Boubacar Diallo (footballer, born 1985), Guinean football centre-back
- Boubacar Diallo (athlete) (born 1960), Senegalese sprinter
- Boubacar Diallo (soccer, born 2002), American soccer midfielder for FC Tulsa
- Boubacar Diallo (politician) (1906–1965), Nigerian politician
