= Siaka Touré =

Guinean general and politician

Siaka Touré

Siaka Touré (1935–1985) was the commandant of Camp Boiro in Conakry, Guinea during the regime of Guinean President Ahmed Sékou Touré. During this period, many of the president's political opponents died in the camp.

== Biography ==
Siaka Touré was born in 1935 in Kankan, and studied in Paris and Moscow. He was a nephew (or perhaps cousin) of the President, Sékou Touré. As such, he was also a descendant of Samori Ture. He became an army officer, and also served as Minister of Transport. After the Labé plot was announced by the government in February 1969, Captain Siaka Touré became a member of the three-person Revolutionary Committee along with the President and General Lansana Diané, the Minister of Defense. Siaka had a collection of cars which he confiscated at will, imprisoning those who had the arrogance to protest.

== Operation Green Sea ==
During the coup attempt ("Operation Green Sea") of November 1970, when Portuguese troops and Guinean fighters invaded Conakry and seized Camp Boiro among other locations, Siaka managed to hide in the Camayenne hotel and avoid capture. After the coup attempt failed, many opponents of the regime were rounded up and imprisoned in Camp Boiro. Siaka Touré presented a mild-mannered facade during interrogations, often proposing to act as an intermediary between the prisoner and his family. He was the sole master of the camp, allowing nobody to enter or leave without his permission. During his long tenure, many political prisoners died, some executed, some as a result of torture, and some from the "diète noire", or "black diet", meaning that they received no food and no water.

== Guinean Market Women's Revolt ==
In 1977, there was a demonstration in Conakry, called the Guinean Market Women's Revolt, staged by women complaining of regulations against private traders. Siaka Touré met the demonstrators with a detachment of troops, and when they failed to stop ordered the troops to open fire. One woman was killed and many others were arrested.

After the death of Sékou Touré in March 1984, Siaka Touré was imprisoned by the military regime that took power. Following an attempted coup by Diarra Traoré in July 1985, he was executed along with other members of the former regime such as Ismaël Touré, Mamadi Keïta and Moussa Diakité.
