= Fode =

Fode is a given name or a surname. Notable people with this given name or surname include:

== Given name ==
- Yaguine Koita and Fodé Tounkara (born 1985)
- Fode, a Star Wars Resistance fictional character
- Fode Cisse, Guinean politician
- Fode Dabo, Sierra Leonean diplomat
- Fode Mamadou Touré (1910–1992), Guinean politician
- Fodé Ballo-Touré (born 1997), football player
- Fodé Bangaly Diakité (born 1985), Ivorian football player
- Fodé Bangoura, Guinean politician
- Fodé Bouya Camara (born 1946), Guinean football player
- Fodé Camara (born 1973), Guinean football player
- Fodé Camara (footballer, born 1973) (born 1973), Guinean football player
- Fodé Camara (footballer, born 1988) (born 1988), Guinean football player
- Fodé Camara (footballer, born 1998) (born 1998), Guinean football player
- Fodé Doucouré (born 2001), Malian football player
- Fodé Fofana (born 2002), Dutch football player
- Fodé Mansaré (born 1981), Guinean football player
- Fodé Moussa Sylla (born 1988), Guinean football player
- Fodé Seck, Senegalese diplomat
- Fodé Soumah, Guinean politician
- Fodé Sylla (born 1963), French politician

== Surname ==
- Gordon Fode (born 1971), Australian football player
- Henning Fode (born 1948), Danish civil servant
- Pierson Fodé (born 1991), American celebrity
