= N'Famara Keïta =

Guinean economist and politician

Minister of Trade
- In office 1 January 1963 – 1 February 1964
- President: Ahmed Sékou Touré

Member of the Politburo
- In office 19 January 1968 – 3 April 1984
- President: Ahmed Sékou Touré

Minister of Energy
- In office 1 June 1979 – 3 April 1984
- President: Ahmed Sékou Touré

Personal details
- Born: 1924 Molota, Kindia Region, French Guinea
- Died: c. 1984 Guinea
- Cause of death: Execution
- Party: Democratic Party of Guinea – African Democratic Rally

N'Famara Keïta (1924 - c.1984) was a Guinean economist and politician. He served in the council of the Politburo of the First Republic of Guinea as Minister of Trade from 1963.

Keïta was born in 1924 in Molota in the Kindia Region, completed some secondary schooling in Dakar and in 1947 was appointed a court clerk in Macenta. He was selected by the future President Ahmed Sékou Touré as a trade union activist, and became a member of the Guinean Democratic Party. In 1956 he was elected mayor of Kindia. When Guinea gained independence from France, on 10 November 1958 he was appointed secretary of state in the Office of the Presidency.

In April 1960, as Minister of Cooperatives, he unveiled a plan for development of industry and agriculture that significantly increased collective ownership of the means of production, a measure greeted enthusiastically by party militants and unexpectedly endorsed by the president. In 1962 he visited Moscow, where he signed a trade agreement. On 1 January 1963 he was appointed Minister of Trade, on 1 February 1964 he was named Vice-President and on 8 November 1964 he became Minister for Macenta. On 19 January 1968 he was named a member of the politburo and Minister of Commerce, Transport, Posts and Telecommunications. In this role, in February 1969 he visited China in 1969 where he met Mao Zedong in Beijing. In the 1972 cabinet he became Minister of Social Affairs. In May 1972 he was among the members of the National Politburo who welcomed Fidel Castro of Cuba on his visit to Guinea. In a final cabinet reorganization on 1 June 1979 he was appointed Minister of Energy and for Konkouré.

After the death of Sékou Touré, the military seized power and arrested Keïta and other members of the former government. He was later executed.
