= Alpha Oumar Barry =

Guinean politician

Minister of State for Exchange
- In office 19 June 1972 – 2 August 1976

Personal details
- Born: October 1926 Hamidouya
- Died: February 26, 1977 (aged 49)

Alpha Oumar Barry (1925–1977) was a Guinean politician, a member of the cabinet of President Ahmed Sékou Touré in the first Guinean republic, who was later arrested and died at Camp Boiro.

Alpha Oumar was born in 1925, and trained as a doctor in Bordeaux, France. He was appointed chief medical officer in Kindia. Alpha Oumar was appointed minister of state for Exchange in the cabinet announced on 19 June 1972. He was also a member of the political bureau of the Democratic Party of Guinea (PDG).

At a press conference on 2 August 1976, Sekou Toure announced the arrest in Conakry of several plotters, including Telli Diallo, Alpha Oumar Barry, Lamine Kouyaté and Alioune Dramé. Both Alpha Oumar and Alioune Dramé had been childhood friends of Telli Diallo. After his arrest, the camp commandant Siaka Touré transmitted a series of messages to Alpha Oumar from President Touré demanding that he confess to being a plotter to save the face of the revolution. Eventually Alpha Oumar gave in and made a confession. On 12 February 1977, Alpha Oumar and others were placed on a "black diet", meaning they were deprived of food and water. He died on 26 February 1977.
