= Abdoulaye Touré =

Abdoulaye Touré may refer to:

- Abdoulaye Touré (politician) (1920-1985), Guinean politician
- Abdoulaye Touré (footballer) (born 1994), Guinean footballer
