= Loffo Camara =

Guinean politician

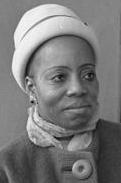
- Camara in 1962

Secretary of State for Social Affairs
- In office 1961–1968

Personal details
- Born: c. 1925
- Died: 25 January 1971 Conakry, Guinea

Loffo Camara (c. 1925 – 25 January 1971) was a senior Guinean politician and a member of the Politburo of the First Republic of Guinea in the years immediately following independence. After falling out with the President Sékou Touré, she was dismissed from the cabinet, and later was arrested and executed.

Loffo Camara was trained as a midwife, and became an activist in the Democratic Party of Guinea (PDG) in Macenta. She was elected a member of the National Assembly, and became a member of the PDG Central Committee. In July 1960 she visited the German Democratic Republic on an information gathering trip. From 1961 to 1968 she was Secretary of State for Social Affairs.

At a party conference in November 1962, Loffo Camara and two others proposed that members of the Politburo should be selected from activists and elected by all party members. This was in reaction to President Sékou Touré's wish to appoint Toumany Sangare and Fodéba Keita to the politburo, neither of whom had held positions of responsibility in the party. At the 8th party congress in 1967, Sékou Touré consolidated his grip on power, and was proclaimed supreme leader of the Revolution. He reduced the politburo from 15 to 7. Loffo Camara was one of those dismissed.

Loffo Camara was among those arrested in December 1970 following an unsuccessful seaborne attack on Guinea by Portuguese troops. She was transferred from Kindia to Conakry on 24 January 1971 and shot on 25 January 1971. The firing squad included Mamadi Keita, the president's brother in law. She was the only woman to be executed at this time.
