= Kerfalla =

Kerfalla is a Guinean surname. Notable people with the surname include:

- Kerfalla Camara (1941–2007), Guinean politician
- Kerfalla Person Camara (born 1970), Guinean businessman
- Kerfalla Exumé (born 1994), Canadian football player
- Kerfalla Yansané, Guinean lawyer and diplomat
