= Yansané =

Yansané is a surname. Notable people with the surname include:

- Abdoulaye Yansané (1937–1989), Guinean footballer
- Kerfalla Yansané, Guinean lawyer and politician
- Mélissa Yansané (born 1999), Congolese singer
- Momo Yansané (born 1997), Guinean footballer
- Ndeye Saly Yansané (born 1985), Senegalese fencer
- Sekou Yansané (born 2003), French footballer
