= Balla Camara =

Guinean economist and politician (1926–1971)

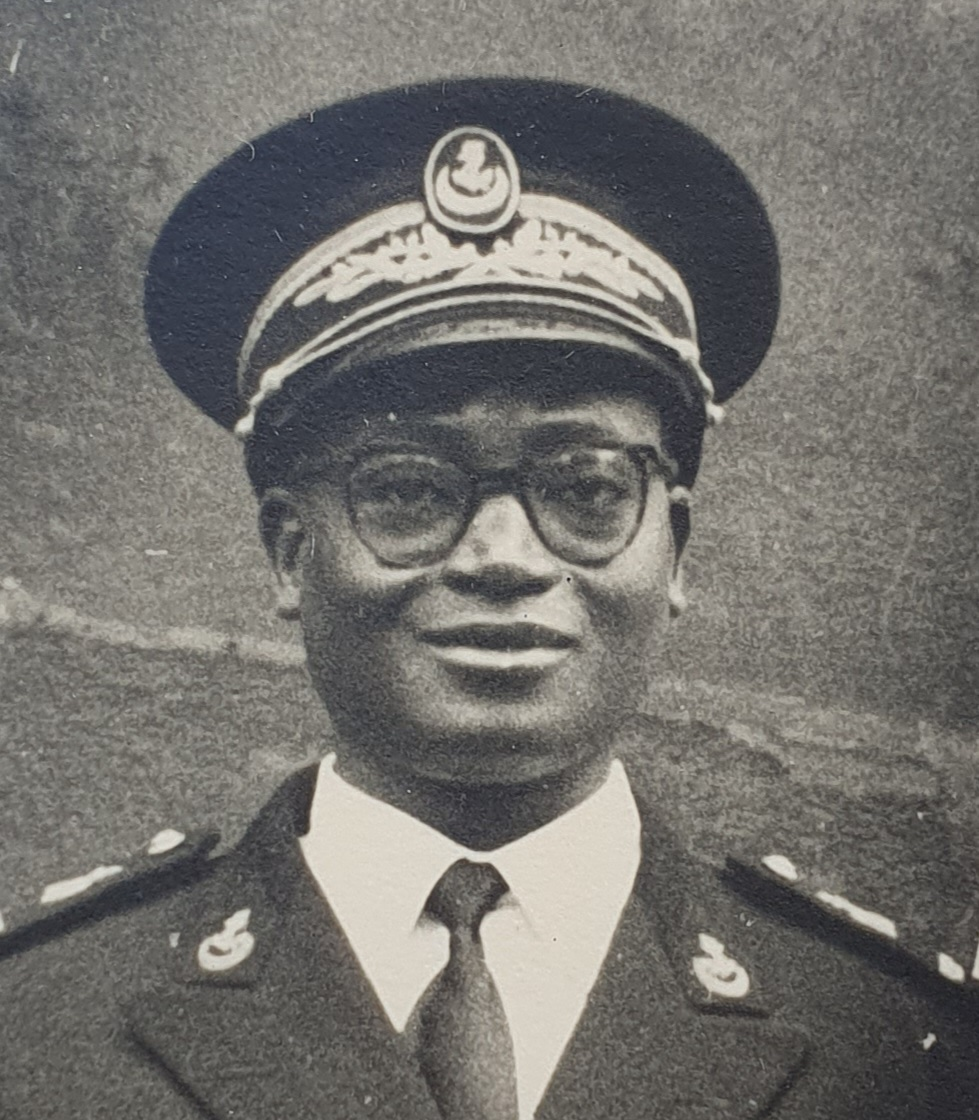

Balla Camara (20 October 1926 – 3 January 1971) was a Guinean economist and politician. He played an important role in the smooth running of France's overseas administration, serving as colonial administrator of Upper Volta (now Burkina Faso) from 1954 to 1958. Following Guinea's independence in 1960, he was successively appointed Inspector General of Administrative and Financial Affairs; Secretary General of the Government; Secretary of State for Justice, Administrative Control and Finance; Minister of Finance and Administration; Minister of Internal Trade; and finally Governor of the Central Bank of the Republic of Guinea from 1969 to 1970. He served in the council of the Politburo of the First Republic of Guinea as Secretary of State from 1963. He was also a Secretary for Internal Trade and Commerce. He was assassinated by the regime of Sékou Touré on 3 January 1971 for his differences with the regime's extremist methods.
