= Mamadi Keïta =

Guinean politician

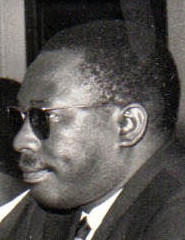

Minister of Education
- In office 1972 – March 1984

Personal details
- Born: 1933 Kankan, French Guinea
- Died: 8 July 1985 (aged 51–52) Kindia, Guinea
- Relations: Seydou Keïta (Brother); Ahmed Sékou Touré (Brother-in-law)

Mamadi Keïta (1933 – July 1985) was a leading Guinean politician and member of the Politburo of the First Republic of Guinea.

== Early years ==
Mamadi Keïta was born in Kankan, French Guinea in 1933. He went to Paris, France for his higher education, where he studied philosophy. After becoming leader of the West African Student's Organization, he was expelled from France in 1961. He earned a doctorate in philosophy from the University of Geneva. Returning to Guinea, he became in turn professor, dean and president of the University of Conakry.

== Political career ==
Mamadi Keïta was the half-brother of President Sékou Touré's wife, Andrée, which gained him admission to the inner circle of power in the Touré regime. He became a member of the Central Committee for ideological affairs of the Democratic Party of Guinea. In January 1971 he was reported to have been a member of the firing squad that shot the former politician Ms. Camara Loffo. He assisted in the interrogation of Diallo Telli, who was starved to death at Camp Boiro in March 1977.

In 1972, he was leader of the left-wing faction in the Politburo, and was engaged in a struggle with Ismaël Touré to be recognized as the next in line to succeed the president. At the 9th party congress that year, the right-center took control. Sékou Touré remained president and Lansana Beavogui was given the newly created title of prime minister. Ismaël Touré gained the powerful position of Minister of the Economy and Finance, while Mamadi Keïta was relegated to Minister of Culture and Education. His brother Seydou Keïta became ambassador to Western Europe.

In the summer of 1974 he attended the Sixth Pan-African Congress in Dar es Salaam, Tanzania, where he was chairman of the Political Committee, with Marcelino dos Santos of FRELIMO as vice-chairman. In October 1980, as Minister of Higher Education and Scientific Research he attended an executive board meeting of UNESCO, held in Belgrade, where he was appointed to the Special Committee for the triennium and the Committee on International Non-Governmental Organizations. In November 1982, he attended the first session of the executive council of ISESCO (Islamic Educational, Scientific and Cultural Organization) in Rabat, Morocco. He was present at the third ISESCO session held in Casablanca in June 1983. In December 1983 he was elected a vice-chairman of the UNESCO executive board.

After the political coup that followed the death of Sekou Toure, he was arrested on 3 April 1984. In July 1985 he was executed by firing squad after the attempted coup led by Diarra Traoré.
