= Ousmane Baldé =

Guinean economist and politician

Ousmane Baldé (died 1971) was a Guinean economist and politician. He was President of the Central Bank of the Republic of Guinea 1963–1965, and served as a Minister of Economy and Finance. He was accused of being a mercenary in the Portuguese invasion of Guinea, arrested, and hanged without trial in 1971 along with Ibrahima Barry, Magassouba Moriba, Kaita Kara de Soufiane and others.
