= Alassane Diop =

Guinean politician

Alassane Diop was a Minister of Information in Guinea who was arrested and held in Camp Boiro for ten years, returning to Senegal after his release.

Diop was Senegalese in origin and was trained as an electrical engineer. He became Minister of Posts and Telecommunications in Guinea. He was named by President Sékou Touré as head of a commission to investigate foreign invaders in the interior of Guinea. He reported that there were none. Toure thanked him for his work, and gave him 15 days of leave in Bulgaria. While he was absent, a new commission headed by Ismaël Touré concluded that there were in fact invaders, and that Diop was an accomplice. He was arrested in 1971 and spent ten years in prison. By 1976 he was one of the only survivors of the ministers who had been arrested and sent to camp Boiro since 1969.
