= Damantang Camara =

Guinean politician

Damantang Camara (died 1985–87) was a Guinean politician. He served in the first council of the Politburo of the First Republic of Guinea as Minister of Public Affairs from 1957. He held a number of other positions under Sékou Touré at different times, including Minister of Justice and Minister for Maritime Guinea, as well as rising to the rank of President of the Popular Revolutionary Assembly from 1974 to 1984. Camara was among a number of politicians condemned to 28 months in prison under the Lansana Conté regime for his participation in the Sékou Touré government. He died either in 1985 or shortly after his release from prison in 1986 or 1987.

His grandson is the politician and minister Albert Damantang Camara.
