= Faraban Camara =

Guinean politician

Faraban Camara was a Guinean inspector and politician. He served in the first council of the Politburo of the First Republic of Guinea as Minister of Education from 1957. A one-time friend of President Touré, he was forced to flee the country.
