= United Nations Security Council Resolution 290 =

UN Security Council Resolution 290
- Date: December 8 1970
- Meeting no.: 1,563
- Code: S/RES/290 (Document)
- Subject: Complaint by Guinea
- Voting summary: 11 voted for; None voted against; 4 abstained
- Result: Adopted

Security Council composition
- Permanent members: China; France; Soviet Union; United Kingdom; United States
- Non-permanent members: Burundi; Colombia; Finland; Nepal; Poland; Spain; Syria; Zambia

United Nations Security Council Resolution 290, adopted on December 8, 1970, after more invasions of the territory of the Republic of Guinea by naval and military units of Portugal on November 22/23 and 27/28 (codenamed Operação Mar Verde by the Portuguese), the Council reaffirmed its numerous previous resolutions on the topic, including the right of the peoples of Angola, Mozambique and Portuguese Guinea to be freed from the Portuguese Empire ruled by the Estado Novo regime. The Council endorsed the conclusions of the report by the Special Mission to the Republic of Guinea, strongly condemned the Portuguese Government, demanded that full compensation be paid to the Republic and declared that Portuguese colonialism was a serious threat to the peace and security of Africa.

The Council then urged all states to refrain from providing Portugal with any military and material assistance which would enable them to continue its repressive actions and called on Portugal to immediately release its African territories. The resolution concluded by warning Portugal that any repetition of these attacks would warrant immediate consideration of appropriate steps and requested Portugal's allies to exert their influence on the Council's behalf.

The resolution was passed with 11 votes; France, Spain, the United Kingdom and United States abstained.

== See also ==
- List of United Nations Security Council Resolutions 201 to 300 (1965–1971)
- Operation Green Sea
- Portuguese Empire
- Portuguese Guinea
