= Abdourahamane Diallo =

Guinean physician and politician

Abdourahamane Diallo was a Guinean physician and politician born in Dalein, Labé.

He served in the first council of the Politburo of the First Republic of Guinea as Minister of Cooperation from 1957.
