= Ibrahima Sory Barry =

Guinean politician

Ibrahima Sory Barry (died 1975) was a Guinean chief and politician. For many years he was a very prominent chief of Mamou until 1957 when he was appointed for more national and international duties. He served in the council of the Politburo of the First Republic of Guinea as Minister of Rural Economy from 1963.
