= Ismaël Touré =

Guinean politician

Minister of Public Works
- In office 1957 – January 1963

Minister of Economic Development
- In office January 1963 – May 1969
- Succeeded by: Louis Lansana Beavogui

Minister of Economy and Finance
- In office May 1969 – June 1972
- Preceded by: Saifoulaye Diallo
- Succeeded by: Mamadou Béla Doumbouya

Personal details
- Born: 1925/1926 Faranah, Guinea
- Died: 8 July 1985 (aged 59–60) Guinea
- Relations: Ahmed Sékou Touré (Half-brother)

Ismaël Touré (1925/1926 – 8 July 1985) was a Guinean political figure and the half brother of President Ahmed Sékou Touré. He was the chief prosecutor at the notorious Camp Boiro.

== Early career ==
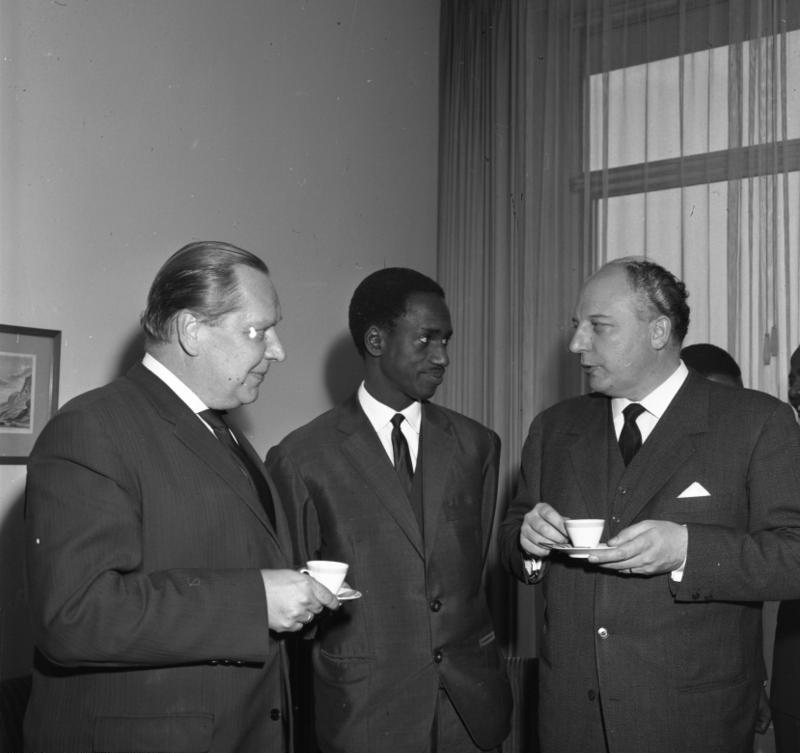
A 1964 reception for Ismaël Touré hosted by Federal Minister of Economic Cooperation and Development Walter Scheel (right) in Bonn.

Ismaël Touré was born in Faranah, Guinea in 1926. He attended school in Paris along with his compatriot Boubacar Telli Diallo. He was trained as a meteorologist.

In 1956 he served on the local council in Kankan, where he was also head of the weather station and was elected as a territorial adviser to the Faranah Prefecture. He was elected Minister of Public Works in 1957 and Minister of Economic Development in January 1963. He became a member of the tight-knit group of close relatives who supported President Sékou Touré and who became the primary beneficiaries of the regime. Decisions were often based on personal interests. For example, rather than encourage mining of Guinea's rich iron ore deposits, Ismaël Touré preferred to transport iron ore from Liberia using the Transguinean Railways.

Ismaël Touré led the Organization for Solidarity for the People of Africa and Asia (OSPAA) when it met for the first time in Cairo, Egypt in 1957. He was president of the board responsible for solidarity funds, assisted by two vice-chairmen, Mehdi Ben Barka of Morocco and Chu Tzu-chi of the People's Republic of China. However, by 1959 he was in favor of closer ties with the United States and other western countries, in opposition to Keita Fodéba, who saw advantages in alignment with the communist bloc. Sékou Touré maintained a non-aligned position.

In May 1969, Touré was replaced as Minister of Economic Affairs by Louis Lansana Beavogui, who was given the newly created post of prime minister in April 1972.

== Later career ==
On 22 November 1970, Portuguese troops and Guinean fighters launched a seaborne attack on the Conakry area of Guinea in an attempt to overthrow the government, occupying key positions and releasing political prisoners held in the camps. The attack failed, and the raiders withdrew. Sékou Touré used the attack as an excuse for mass arrests of political opponents.

The effect of the mass arrests in 1970 was to remove all opposition to the inner circle of power, with political life reduced to a struggle between different clans for position within the system. The inner circle was divided into three factions, each led by a relative of the president. Sékou Touré himself was leader of the centrist party and Ismaël Touré was leader of the pro-western party, called "bourgeois degenerates" by the leftist leader Mamadi Keïta. Ismaël Touré and Mamady Keïta were locked in a struggle to be named the successor to the president. The 9th party congress in 1972 resolved the contest in favor of the center-right. Sékou Touré remained president and Louis Lansana Beavogui became prime minister. Ismaël Touré was given the senior Ministry of Economy and Finance, Moussa Diakité became Minister of Interior and Security and Mamady Keïta was relegated to the Ministry of Culture and Education.

In April 1978, as Minister of the Economy and Finance, Ismaël Touré signed a protocol on non-aggression between members of the Economic Community of West African States (ECOWAS).

== Fall from power ==
After his brother, President Sékou Touré, died on 26 March 1984, Ismaël Touré competed with Prime Minister Louis Lansana Beavogui to take power. However, on 3 April 1984 General Lansana Conté took control in a bloodless coup. In 1985 Conté took advantage of an alleged coup attempt to execute several of Sekou Touré's close associates, including Ismael Touré. Others executed included Seydou Keita, Siaka Touré, former commander of Camp Boiro, and Moussa Diakité. Ismaël Touré died on 18 July 1985.
