= Najib Roger Accar =

Guinean physician and politician

Najib Roger Accar was a Guinean physician and politician. He served in the first council of the Politburo of the First Republic of Guinea as Minister of Health from 1957 and Minister of Transport from 1963. He was also secretary-general for the Services of the Presidency and for the Interior.

Roger Accar was a French/Guinean and became health minister of Guinea when the country became free in 1958. He was either surgeon and contributed to the construction of many health structures and hospitals in the country. In 1963 he became transport minister but he had to quit Guinea under Sekou Touré government due to political problems. He lived in France for a while where he was surgeon chief in the CHU of Normandie and he returned in Guinea after the death of the president Sekou Touré where he died in 2005.
