= Alioune Dramé =

Guinean economist and politician

Alioune Dramé (born c. 1921 – died 1 March 1977) was a Guinean economist and politician. He also served as an ambassador to Ivory Coast.

== Career ==
Dramé served in the first council of the Politburo of the First Republic of Guinea as Minister of Economy and Finance from 1957. In this role, he signed the first bank notes of the republic, and established the Guinean franc in 1960. Drame was made responsible for the plans for economic development of Guinea for the periods 1960-1963, 1964–1971 and 1973-1979.

== United States Relations ==
On April 24, 1975, Dramé delivered a letter from the president of Guinea, Ahmed Sékou Touré, to Gerald Ford addressing Guinea's food shortage and requesting assistance from the United States. After the 1976 signing of PL 480 by the American government, Dramé returned to the United States on April 27, 1976 with a letter from the Guinean president to start the agreement between the Guinean and United States governments. During this agreement, Dramé led a team of Guinean representatives to negotiate the Title I and Title II food provided by PL 480.

== Arrest ==
Dramé was Minister of Planning when he was arrested on the night of 18/19 July 1976 and imprisoned at Camp Boiro. At a press conference on 2 August 1976, Ahmed Sékou Touré announced the arrest in Conakry of Dramé and several other alleged plotters, including Telli Diallo, Alpha Oumar Barry and Lamine Kouyaté. On 15 February 1977, Dramé was placed on the "black diet" while in Camp Boiro, which meant he was given no food or water until his death. He died on 1 March 1977.
