= Abdoulaye Touré (politician) =

Guinean politician (1920–1985)

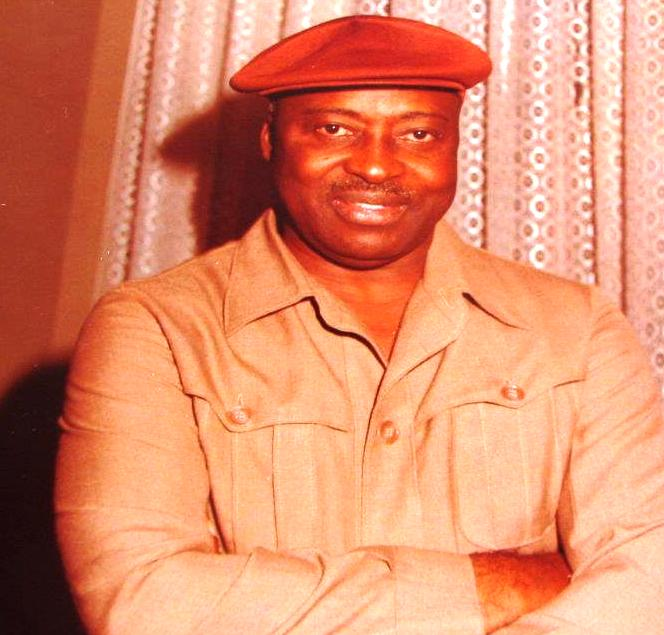

Minister of External Trade
- In office 19 June 1972 – 1 June 1979
- Succeeded by: Momory Camara

Minister of External Affairs
- In office 1 June 1979 – 3 April 1984

Personal details
- Born: 16 December c. 1920 Kankan, Guinea
- Died: 8 July 1985 (aged 64) Kindia, Guinea

Abdoulaye Touré (c. 1920 – July 1985) was a politician in the first Guinean republic. He was arrested after a coup in April 1984, and was executed in July 1985.

== Early life ==
Abdoulaye Touré was born in Kankan on December 16 around 1923, the grandson of Samori Touré + Masséré Cissé (c. 1830 - 1900), the founder of the Wassoulou Empire. He was trained as a physician (William Ponty), serving in E.F.A. Bangui in Kankan and Siguiri in the 1950s.

== Career ==
He became an active member of the Democratic Party of Guinea, and was Governor in Boffa. Hewas made Guinea's ambassador to Mali in 1962, Algeria in 1968. He became Guinea's ambassador to the United Nations in 1970, succeeding Achkar Marof, who had been arrested the year before. On 19 June 1972 he was appointed a Central committee member and Minister of External Trade. On 1 June 1979 he became Minister of External Affairs. After the coup that followed the death of Sekou Toure, on 3 April 1984 he was arrested. He was executed in Kindia in July 1985.
