= Moussa Diakité (politician) =

Guinean politician

Personal details
- Born: 1927 Kankan, Guinea
- Died: 4 July 1985 (aged 57–58) Guinea

Moussa Diakité (1927 – 4 July 1985) was a Guinean politician during the presidency of Ahmed Sékou Touré. He was a member of the national Politburo. His wife, Tata Keïta, was half sister of the President's wife Andrée, and his son married the eldest daughter of Ismael Touré, the president's brother.

In March 1952 Diakité ran for election in Kankan on the RDA platform, while Sékou Touré ran for the forest region. Both men lost. After Touré became first President of Guinea after independence in 1958, Diakite held a number of cabinet posts, serving as minister of banking, security and internal affairs, economy and finance and housing. As Minister-Governor of the Bank of the Republic of Guinea in 1962 he was involved in negotiations with the United States of America over guarantees for foreign investors. He became a member of the tight-knit group of close relatives who supported President Sékou Touré and who became the primary beneficiaries of the regime.

He was a member of the Commission of Inquiry at Camp Boiro, where he conducted the secret investigation followed by the execution of Diallo Telli in 1972. In May 1972, as Minister of the Interior and Security and member of the National Politbureau he was among leaders who welcomed Fidel Castro of Cuba on his visit to Guinea. Diakite was arrested on 3 April 1984, one week after Touré's death. He was executed after the attempted coup by Diarra Traoré on 4 July 1985.
