= Bengaly Camara =

Guinean politician

Bengaly Camara was a Guinean teacher and politician. He served in the first council of the Politburo of the First Republic of Guinea as Minister of Labor and Social Affairs from 1957. He was also a Minister of Information and Tourism.
