= Mamadi Camara (politician) =

Guinean politician

Minister of Economy and Finance,
- President: Alpha Conde
- Preceded by: Malado Kaba

Personal details
- Born: 30 June 1943 (age 83) Conakry, Guinea
- Party: Rally of the Guinean People
- Education: Gamal Abdel Nasser University of Conakry, Bocconi University, IMF Institute
- Portfolio: Chief Economist at the Unit for Political Economy studies (CEPEC) of the African Capacity Building Foundation (1996-1999), Consultant at the United Nations Development Programme (UNDP) (1999-2000), Consultant for the Joint United Nations Programme on HIV/AIDS (UNAIDS) in Cameroon and Togo (1999-2008), Consultant at Deutsche Gesellschaft für Internationale Zusammenarbeit (2003-2006), Privatization unit of the Ministry of Economy and Finance (Guinea) (2002-2006), African Development Bank, Ambassador of Guinea in South Africa (2013-2018)

Mamadi Camara is a Guinean politician who is currently the Minister of Economy and Finance. He is a member of the Majority Rally of the Guinean People Party of former president Alpha Conde.

== Publications ==
- 2016: The Keys to Guinea's development (in English) Editions l'Harmattan, Paris
- 2015: Les Clés pour le développement de la Guinée, Editions l'Harmattan, Paris
- 2010: "Où va la Guinée? : mémorandum à un ami pour sauver notre pays", Editions l'Harmattan, Paris
- 2003: Quarante ans de gestion socialiste et libérale de la monnaie en Guinée (1958-1998) Editions Ganndal, Conakry
