= Guinean coup d'état =

Guinean coup d'état may refer to:

- 1984 Guinean coup d'état
- 2008 Guinean coup d'état
- 2021 Guinean coup d'état
