= Lansana Diané =

Guinean general (??–1985)

General Lansana Diané

Lansana Diané (died 1985) was a general and a minister in the cabinet of Ahmed Sekou Touré, President of Guinea during the First Republic (1958–1984). The military government that took power after Touré's death executed him in 1985.

== Early career ==
Diané was a Malinké from the same village as Sekou Touré. He became one of the leaders of the African Democratic Rally in Guinea in the lead-up to independence from France in 1958. At a meeting in January 1957 he accused the Church of having worked for colonialism, and said that both the state and the church should be liquidated, since they were unsuitable for the African mentality. After independence, Diané was appointed governor of Kankan and Nzérékoré. In 1960, General Diané was leader of the Guinean contingent in the United Nations Operation in the Congo, but his unit was withdrawn by Sekou Touré after the death of Patrice Lumumba early in 1961, because Touré did not believe that the United Nations had adequately protected the Congolese leader.

== Cabinet Minister ==
On his return to Guinea, General Diané was appointed Minister for Labé, where he help to suppress ongoing resistance to the government of Sekou Touré. On 17 November 1965 Diané became Minister of the People's Army and Civil Service. In September 1966, he accompanied Ismaël Touré, Minister of Economic Development and Public Works on a visit to the Federal Republic of Germany. In August 1968 he returned to Bonn, where he met with his counterpart.

Following the unsuccessful "Operation Green Sea" attempt by Portuguese troops to overthrow the regime in November 1970, many of Touré's opponents were rounded up and jailed in Camp Boiro. Diané was captured during the raid, but managed to escape. He was an active participant in the mock trials and executions that followed. He was President of a three-man "revolutionary committee" that interrogated the prisoners. In 1972 Diané was Party Inspector General. In May 1972, he was among the members of the National Politbureau who welcomed Fidel Castro of Cuba on his visit to Guinea. From 1976 until 1 June 1979 he was Minister of Justice. In the cabinet announced on 1 June 1979 he was Minister of the People's Army.

== Fall from power ==
After the death of Sekou Touré on 26 March 1984, the government attempted to retain power. Hearing rumors of a military coup, they dispatched Diané to army headquarters on 2 April to attempt to persuade the leaders not to launch a coup. He pleaded that Touré had been the cause of all the abuses, and his ministers would have died if they had opposed him. However, he was unsuccessful in his pleas, and that night the army took over control of the country. He was imprisoned by the Lansana Conté government after the coup, and in 1985 was executed in Kindia.
