= Jean-Paul Alata =

Jean-Paul Alata (17 August 1924 – September 1978) was a Frenchman who was a political prisoner in Camp Boiro, Guinea from January 1971 to July 1975, later writing a book about his experience which was banned by the French government.

== Early career ==
Alata was born on 17 August 1924 in Brazzaville, Republic of the Congo. His father was of Corsican origin, but he considered himself a "white African". His wife and mother of his children, Tènin, was a Malinké. Alata was a member of the French Communist Party. He served in Senegal for ten years before being dismissed for political reasons and moving to Guinea in 1955. At that time he was in sympathy with the socialist views expressed by Ahmed Sékou Touré, who was to become the first President after Guinea gained independence from France in 1958. He was one of the signatories of an appeal to "French Guineans" to vote against membership of a French West African union proposed by General Charles de Gaulle. He was appointed Director-General of economic and financial affairs for the Presidency. In the early years of the republic he accepted the authoritarian nature of the regime as necessary during the evolution of a society divided into many ethnic groups towards socialism. Later he fell out of sympathy with Touré, leaving office in 1967 but remaining in his adopted country.

== Imprisonment ==
In November 1970, Portuguese troops invaded Conakry from the sea in a failed attempt to overthrow Touré's government. Following the attempt, many opponents of the regime were thrown into captivity in Camp Boiro and other detention centers.

Alata was arrested January 1971 on the grounds that he was an agent of France or the United States, or a member of a neo-Nazi organization from West Germany.

On two occasions he was tortured, he was forced to confess his guilt during interrogations, and he was repeatedly abused during his confinement. However, he escaped execution or death by starvation, the fate of many of the prisoners.

== Later career ==
In July 1975, France agreed to restore diplomatic relations with Guinea after several French prisoners were released from the camp, including Alata. After his release, he wrote a book Prison D'Afrique about his experiences. The book described in detail the brutal tortures and degrading practices that were routine in Camp Boiro. On the orders of the French Minister of the Interior, Michel Poniatowski, the book was banned from publication in France and had to be printed in Belgium. The French authorities did not want to damage the improved relations with Guinea, and did not authorize publication in France until 1982. The book was also banned in Guinea. Alata appeared in the 1978 documentary about the Touré regime La danse avec l’aveugle (If You Dance with a Blind Man), which shattered the myth that Touré was a militant hero and exposed the brutality of the regime. The film won several awards.

Alata died in September 1978 in Abidjan, Côte d'Ivoire. Some said that he was poisoned by his wife on the orders of Sékou Touré.

== Bibliography ==
- Jean-Paul Alata (1976). Prison d'Afrique. Éditions du Seuil. ISBN 2-02-004505-2.
- Jean-Paul Alata. Prison d'Afrique. Camp Boiro Memorial
