= Camp Boiro =

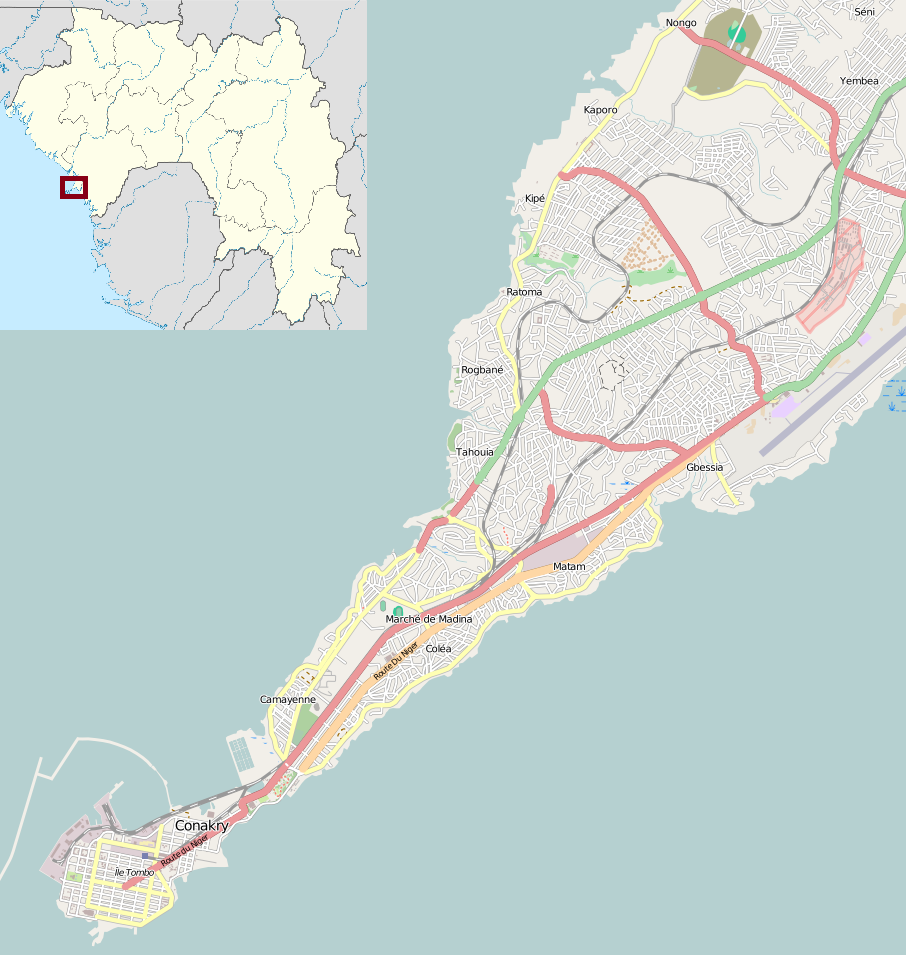
- Location within Conakry
- Coordinates: 9°32′13″N 13°41′08″W
- Country: Guinea
- Region: Conakry Region

Camp Boiro or Camp Mamadou Boiro (1960–1984) is a defunct Guinean concentration camp in the city of Conakry. During the regime of President Ahmed Sékou Touré, thousands of political opponents were imprisoned at the camp. It has been estimated that almost 5,000 people were executed or died from torture or starvation at the camp. According to other estimates, the number of victims was ten times higher: 50,000.

== Early years ==
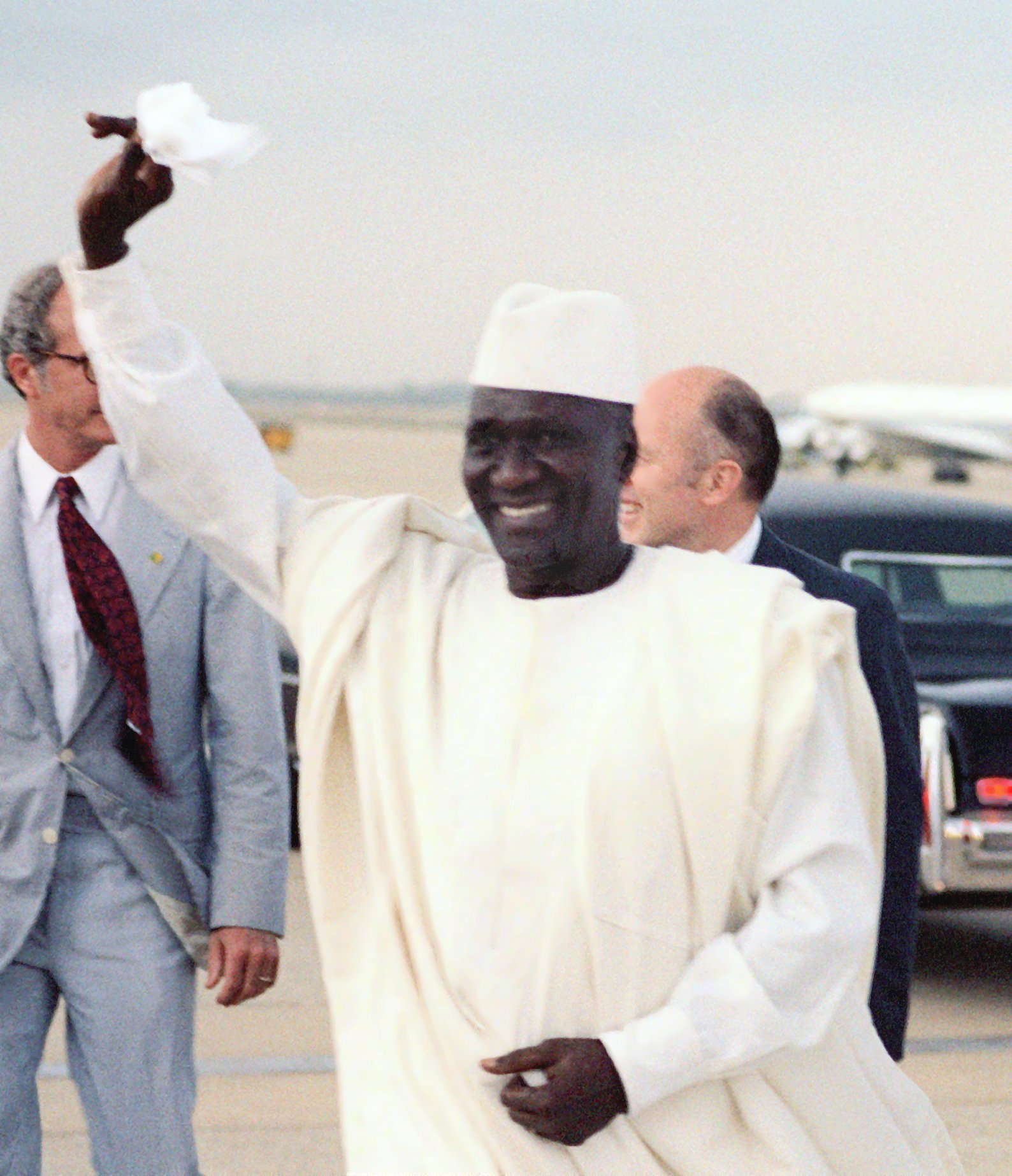
Ahmed Sékou Touré

Sékou Touré became president of Guinea when the country gained independence from France in 1958. Over the years that followed, his regime became increasingly repressive, persecuting opposition leaders and dissidents from within the ruling Guinean Democratic Party (PDG). The camp, situated in the center of Conakry, was originally called Camp Camyenne. It housed the Republican Guard under French colonial rule. The political prison block in the camp was constructed with assistance from the Czechoslovak government. In 1961 the commandant had the windows reduced in size, since they were too large for condemned men. The camp was renamed Camp Mamadou Boiro in 1969 in honor of a police commissioner who had been thrown from a helicopter in which he was transporting prisoners from Labé to Conakry.

The camp was used to dispose of Touré's opponents. Achkar Marof, actor and former Guinean ambassador to the United Nations, was recalled to Guinea in 1968, arrested and jailed at Camp Boiro. He briefly gained his freedom in the 1970 coup attempt. His family learned in 1985 that he had been shot on 26 January 1971. The so-called Labé plot, linked to French imperialism, was uncovered in February 1969. Touré used this plot to purge the army and execute at least 13 people. A total of 87 people were arrested and detained in the camp, including the Minister of Economy & Finance, Diawadou Barry. Two, Mouctar Diallo and Namory Keïta, died of starvation and dehydration only days after their arrest. Fodéba Keïta, former Minister of Defense, was also arrested for alleged complicity in the Labé plot. He was shot after forced starvation on 27 May 1969.

== Aftermath of 1970 coup attempt ==
On 21 November 1970, the Portuguese Armed Forces based in neighbouring Portuguese Guinea, assisted by Guinean oppositionists, executed the Operation Green Sea, an amphibious raid against Conakry aimed to achieve several military and political objectives, including the liberation of Portuguese POWs and the attempt to overthrow the Touré regime. They captured Camp Boiro and liberated the prisoners. The camp commandant Siaka Touré managed to hide, but General Lansana Diané, minister of Defence, was captured. He later escaped and took refuge with the ambassador of Algeria. The coup attempt failed, and in the aftermath many opponents of the regime were rounded up and imprisoned in Camp Boiro. On 23 December 1970, the Bishop of Conakry, Raymond-Marie Tchidimbo, was arrested, and subsequently made a "confession". Tchidimbo later wrote a book about his 8-year, 8-month stay at the camp. Alassane Diop, who was Senegalese in origin, a former Minister of Information in Guinea was arrested and held in Camp Boiro for ten years, returning to Senegal after his release.

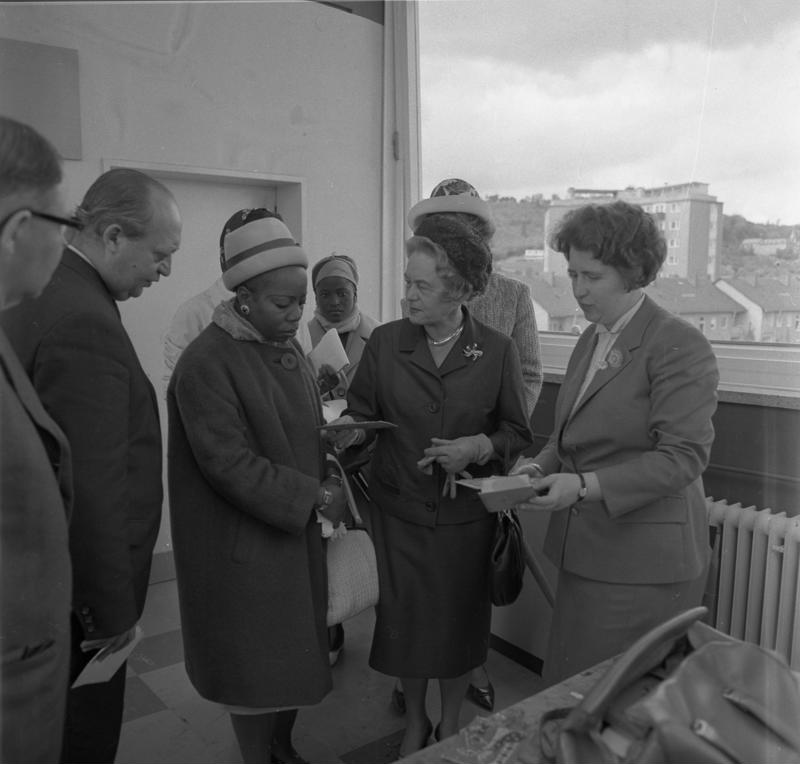
Loffo Camara, one of the victims, in West Germany, 1962

The prisoners were given little food other than a scrap of bread the size of a box of matches in the morning, and a ladle of plain rice cooked in dirty water in the evening. There was never any meat except on days when Touré was performing some sacrifice. Starting in January 1971 the prisoners were interrogated by a Revolutionary Committee headed by Ismaël Touré, half-brother of Sékou Touré and minister of the Economy. Some prisoners were placed on the "black diet", meaning no food or water until they died. Prisoners could only show their courage by refusing to confess during torture sessions, and refusing to beg for food when placed on the black diet. Loffo Camara, former Secretary of State for Social Affairs, was hanged on 25 January 1971, the only woman killed at that time. According to El Hadj Ibrahima Diane, an inmate for many years, from June 1972 until August 1973 at least four corpses were taken from the cells each day and thrown into mass graves in the rear yard of the prison.

In 1975, France agreed to restore diplomatic relations after French prisoners were released from the camp. This reduced pressure on Touré. The book Prison D'Afrique by Jean-Paul Alata, a survivor from the camp, was banned from publication in France and had to be printed in Belgium. Further incarcerations followed in the ensuing years. Diallo Telli was a popular politician, loyal to the regime, and former Secretary General of the Organization of African Unity (OAU). He returned to Guinea in 1972 and was appointed Minister of Justice. On 18 July 1976, Diallo Telli was arrested at his home and imprisoned at Camp Boiro. In February 1977 five prominent prisoners were eliminated through the black diet: Diallo Telli, ex-ministers Barry Alpha Oumar, Dramé Alioune and Fode Cisse, and army officers Diallo Alhassana and Kouyate Laminé. The next month five more people died of starvation.

The arrests and deaths continued. In August 1979 Bah Mamadou, an expatriate from Labé who had moved to France, returned to visit his family. Entering the country from Senegal, all occupants of his vehicle were arrested and jailed at Camp Boiro. Eight of the travellers - all but Bah Mahmoud himself - had died of the black diet within a month. In September 1983 the government announced they had uncovered a plot to sabotage a meeting of the OAU planned to be held in Conakry the next year. Eighty one people were incarcerated in Camp Boiro.

== Legacy ==
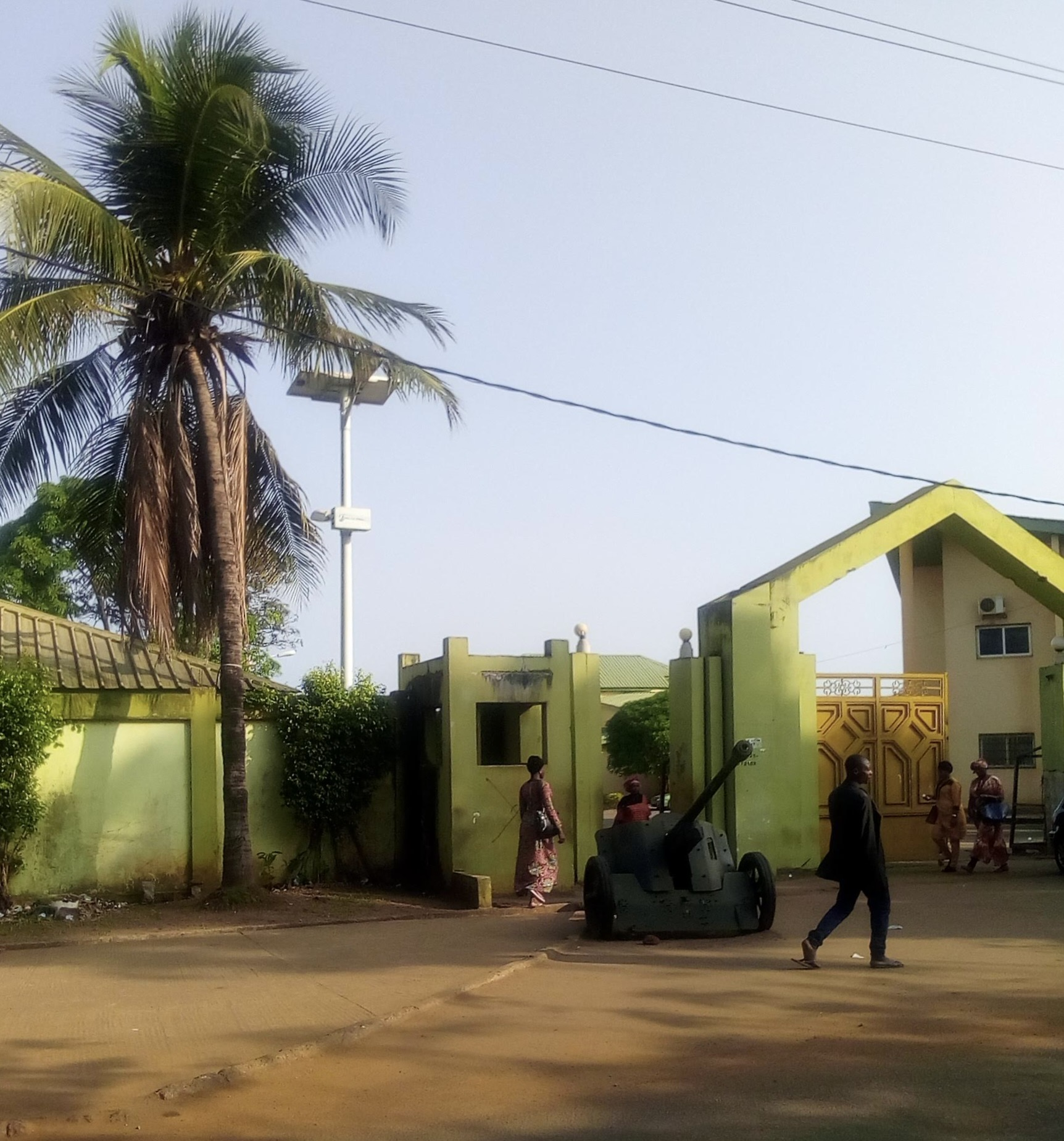
Entrance of Camp Boiro (2019)

After the death of Sékou Touré in 1984, the military took power in a coup d'état and released many of the political prisoners at Camp Boiro. Many of the leaders of the former regime were imprisoned, and later executed. In the years that followed, the association of Victims of Camp Boiro fought for many years to maintain the memory of what had happened. The council of ministers issued a communique on 27 August 1991 for renovation of the camp and construction of a memorial to all the victims, but no action followed. The Association was forbidden to establish a museum in the former camp. In a 2007 interview, Bobo Dieng, a former senior official in the Touré government, stated that there had been just 117 deaths at the camp. It was not until 2009 that the interim president Moussa Dadis Camara met the members of the association. That year, demolition of the camp buildings began, but it was not known whether a memorial would be erected. As of 2010, there had been no commission of inquiry, and all documents about the camp were inaccessible or had been destroyed.

== See also ==
- List of buildings and structures in Guinea

== Movies ==
- La danse avec l'aveugle. 1978
- Allah Tantou (God's Will) 1991
