= Molota =

- Sub-prefecture and town
- Location in Guinea
- Coordinates: 9°56′N 12°50′W
- Country: Guinea
- Region: Kindia Region
- Prefecture: Kindia Prefecture
- Time zone: UTC+0 (GMT)

Molota is a town and sub-prefecture in the Kindia Prefecture in the Kindia Region of western Guinea.
