= Boubacar Yacine Diallo =

Guinean writer (born 1955)

Boubacar Yacine Diallo (born 18 April 1955 in Mamou) is a Guinean journalist, writer and government minister. A graduate of the Academy of Political Science and Journalism in Bucharest, Romania, he has since worked in national broadcasting, and has been the general manager of the Guinean Office of Radio and Television Guinea, Chairman of the National Council of Communication, Minister of Information, and communication adviser of the Presidency of the Republic of Guinea. Since December 24, 2014, he has been a member of the independent national institution for human rights in Guinea.
