= Mamadi Kaba =

Guinean footballer

Personal information
- Full name: Mamadi Kaba
- Date of birth: 15 June 1982 (age 44)
- Place of birth: Kankan, Guinea
- Height: 1.93 m (6 ft 4 in)
- Position: Defender

Team information
- Current team: AS Kaloum Star
- Number: 5

Senior career*
Years	Team	Apps	(Gls)
2001–2002	AC Lugano	6	(0)
2002–2005	AS Kaloum Star	-	(-)
2005–2007	FC Gueugnon	15	(0)
2007–2011	AS Kaloum Star	-	(-)
2011–2012	FC Eu	-	(-)
2013–	AS Kaloum Star	-	(-)

International career^{‡}
2000–2006	Guinea	5	(0)
- * Club domestic league appearances and goals as of July 2006 ‡ National team caps and goals as of N/A

Mamadi Kaba (born 15 June 1982) is a Guinean footballer who currently plays for AS Kaloum Star.

== Club career ==
Born in Kankan, Kaba played football for local side AS Kaloum Star before spells in Europe with FC Lugano and FC Gueugnon. At the club level, Kaba previously played for FC Gueugnon in France.

== International career ==
Kaba was also part of the Guinean 2004 African Nations Cup team, which finished second in its group in the first round of competition, before losing in the quarter-finals to Mali.
