= Fode Cisse =

Guinean politician

Fode Cisse was a Guinean politician. He served in the council of the Politburo of the First Republic of Guinea as Secretary of the Environment from 1963. He was also a Minister for Labor and Social Laws.
