= Ministry of Economy and Finance (Guinea) =

Government ministry of Guinea

- Ministère de l'Economie et des Finances (French)

Ministry overview
- Formed: 1958
- Jurisdiction: Government of Guinea
- Headquarters: Conakry
- Minister responsible: Mariama Cire Sylla, Minister of Economy, Finance and Budget
- Website: Official Website

The Ministry of Economy and Finance of Guinea is a department of the Government of Guinea in charge of public finances of Guinea.

== Responsibilities ==
The Ministry of Economy and Finance is charged with the General planning and administration of political economy and finances of the government as well as the maintenance of the heritage of the Republic. More precisely, the specific missions of the Ministry are:

- to conceive, detail and put into action the policy of the Government regarding public finances.
- to develop and oversee the application of the regulation of for-profit games.
- to ensure the mobilization of non-tax revenue.
- to develop and ensure the application of public procurement regulations
- to ensure the collection, analysis and dissemination of economic and financial information
- to represent the State in negotiations with development partners and to sign financial conventions and agreements
- to define the public debt policy and ensure its regulation
- to ensure the control of public finance management
- to ensure the supervision of the financial holdings of the State
- to ensure the financial supervision of public enterprises and of those with public participation
- to participate in the promotion of private investments
- to participate in the development of the financial regulation system
- to participate in diagnostic and outlook studies allowing the design, development, monitoring and evaluation of public policies
- to participate in the development of finance laws and the oversight of their execution
- To participate in the setting of monetary and exchange rate policy objectives in collaboration with the monetary authorities
- to consider the environmental dimension in the sector's programs and projects
- to promote gender equity in the sector's programs and projects

== Organization ==
The Ministry of Economy and Finance consists of:

- a Secretary General
  - a Cabinet
  - Support Services
  - National Directorates
  - Related Services
  - Public Programs and Projects
  - Deconcentrated Services
  - an Advisory Body

The Cabinet consists of:

- a Chef de Cabinet
  - a legal advisor
  - an advisor in charge of monetary and economic questions
  - a Public Finance Advisor
  - an Advisor in charge of state policy
  - an attache de Cabinet

Support Services consist of:

- The General Finance Inspectorate
- The Strategy and Development Office
- The Documentation and Archives Center
- The Communications and External Relations Unit
- The Information Systems Modernization Service
- The Gender and Equity Service
- The Hygiene, Health and Safety Service
- The Human Resources Division
- The Financial Affairs Division
- The Central Secretariat
- The Reception and Information Service
- The Technical Program Monitoring Unit
- The Training Service

The National Directorates are

- The National Directorate of Economic Studies and Forecasts
- The National Directorate of the Treasury and Public Accounts
- The National Directorate of Public Procurement
- The National Directorate of Debt and Public Development Assistance
- The National Directorate of Financial Control
- The National Directorate of Public Heritage and Private Investments

== Ministers of Economy and Finance ==
- Alioune Dramé, May 1957 – Jan 1961
- Diawadou Barry, Jan 1961 – Jan 1963
- Moussa Diakité, January 1963 – February 1964
- Saifoulaye Diallo, February 1964 – May 1969
- Ismaël Touré, May 1969 – June 1972
- Mamadou Béla Doumbouya, 1972
- Fode Mamadou Touré, 1972 – March 1984
- Kémoko Keita, 1984 – 1985
- Sory Doumbouya, 1985 – ?
- Lamine Bolivogui, ? – 1986 – 1989
- Edouard Benjamin, 1989 – 1992
- Soriba Kaba, 1992 – August 1994
- Ibrahima Camara, August 1994 – July 1996
- Ousmane Kaba, 1996 – 1998
- Ibrahima Kassory Fofana, 1998 – 2000
- Cheick Amadou Camara, 2000 – 2004
- Madikaba Camara, 2004 – 2007
- Ousmane Dore, 2007 – 2008
- Karamokoba Camara, 2008
- Mamadou Sande, 2009 – 2010
- Kerfalla Yansané, 2010 – 2014
- Mohamed Diaré, 2014 – 2016
- Malado Kaba, 2016 – 2018
- Mamadi Camara, 2018 -2021
- Lanciné Condé, 2021–2022
- Moussa Cissé, 2022–2024
- Mourana Soumah, 2024–Incumbent

== See also ==
- Government of Guinea
- Economy of Guinea
- Ministry of Budget (Guinea)
- Banque Centrale de la République de Guinée
- Ministry of Investments and Public-Private Partnerships (Guinea)
