= Boubacar Diallo (politician) =

Nigerien politician

Boubakar Diallo

Traditional Ruler

Scretary General of the Association of Traditional Chiefs of Niger

Personal details
- Born: Niamey
- Party: Nigerien Progressive Party (PPN-RDA)

Boubacar Ali Diallo (born February 6, 1906, in Niamey; died May 11, 1965, in Niamey; also known as Boubakar Diallo) was a Nigerian politician.

== Life ==
Diallo was the traditional ruler of Lamordé near Niamey and Secretary General of the Association des Chefs Coutumiers du Niger, the association of traditional rulers of Niger, who were subject to France until the country's independence in 1960. Diallo was elected as a deputy to the Niger Parliament in the 1952 territorial assembly elections for the Union of Independent Nigeriens and Sympathizers (UNIS), a party close to the French administration. He remained a member of this party until 1957. At the same time, he represented Niger in the Grand Council of French West Africa in Dakar. The constitutional referendum of 1958 resulted in Niger remaining part of France. In the run-up to the referendum, Boubacar Diallo, along with Samna Maïzoumbou and Mouddour Zakara, was one of the traditional rulers who had most supported France.

After the collapse of UNIS, Diallo was re-elected to parliament in the 1958 territorial assembly elections for the Nigerien Progressive Party (PPN-RDA), which had also become pro-French. In the government formed by his new party colleague, Hamani Diori, he served as Minister of Health from 1958 to 1960. During this period, the party's youth and Western-educated civil servants within the PPN-RDA increasingly marginalized the traditional rulers. Diallo therefore rejected the party's expansion in his Lamordé domain, which led to tensions within the cabinet.

Niger became independent in 1960 under the leadership of the then President Hamani Diori through a treaty with France. The PPN-RDA now ruled the country as a single party. Boubacar Diallo remained in the government, first as Minister of Justice and from 1963 as Minister of Labor and Public Service. In addition, he became president of the Special Court for State Security, established in April 1964, which from June 1964 operated with the expanded powers of a military court. The court was to deal with planned attacks and coup attempts and was directed in particular against the banned Sawaba party. The mistrust of the government under Hamani Diori soon went beyond the Sawaba and extended even to ministers of his own party.

Boubacar Diallo, along with Ikhia Zodi, was one of the first victims of the tense political climate. In September 1964, he was removed from all his offices on charges of withholding information about a past assassination plot. Initially placed under house arrest, he was imprisoned in December 1964. Six months later, he died of fever.
