= Central Bank of the Republic of Guinea =

Monetary Authority of Guinea

Coordinates: 9.5098°N 13.7144°W

Central Bank of the Republic of Guinea Banque Centrale de la République de Guinée

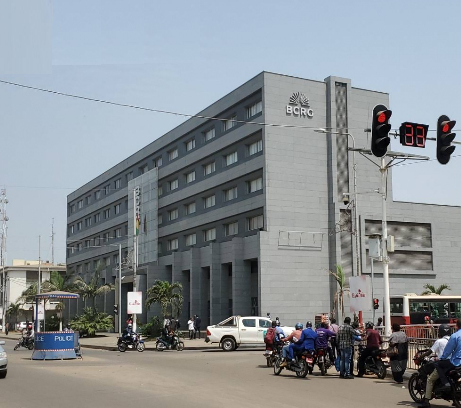
- Central bank of: Guinea
- Established: 1 March 1960
- Ownership: 100% state ownership
- Governor: Karamo Kaba
- Currency: Guinean franc GNF (ISO 4217)
- Reserves: 50 million USD
- Website: www.bcrg-guinee.org

The Central Bank of the Republic of Guinea (French: Banque Centrale de la République de Guinée, BCRG; N'Ko: ߖߌ߬ߣߍ߫ ߞߊ߲ߓߍ߲ ߕߊ߲ߓߊ߲ ߜߍߓߏ߲) is the central bank of Guinea. The headquarters of the bank is located in the capital city of Conakry. The current governor is Dr Karamo Kaba.

== History ==
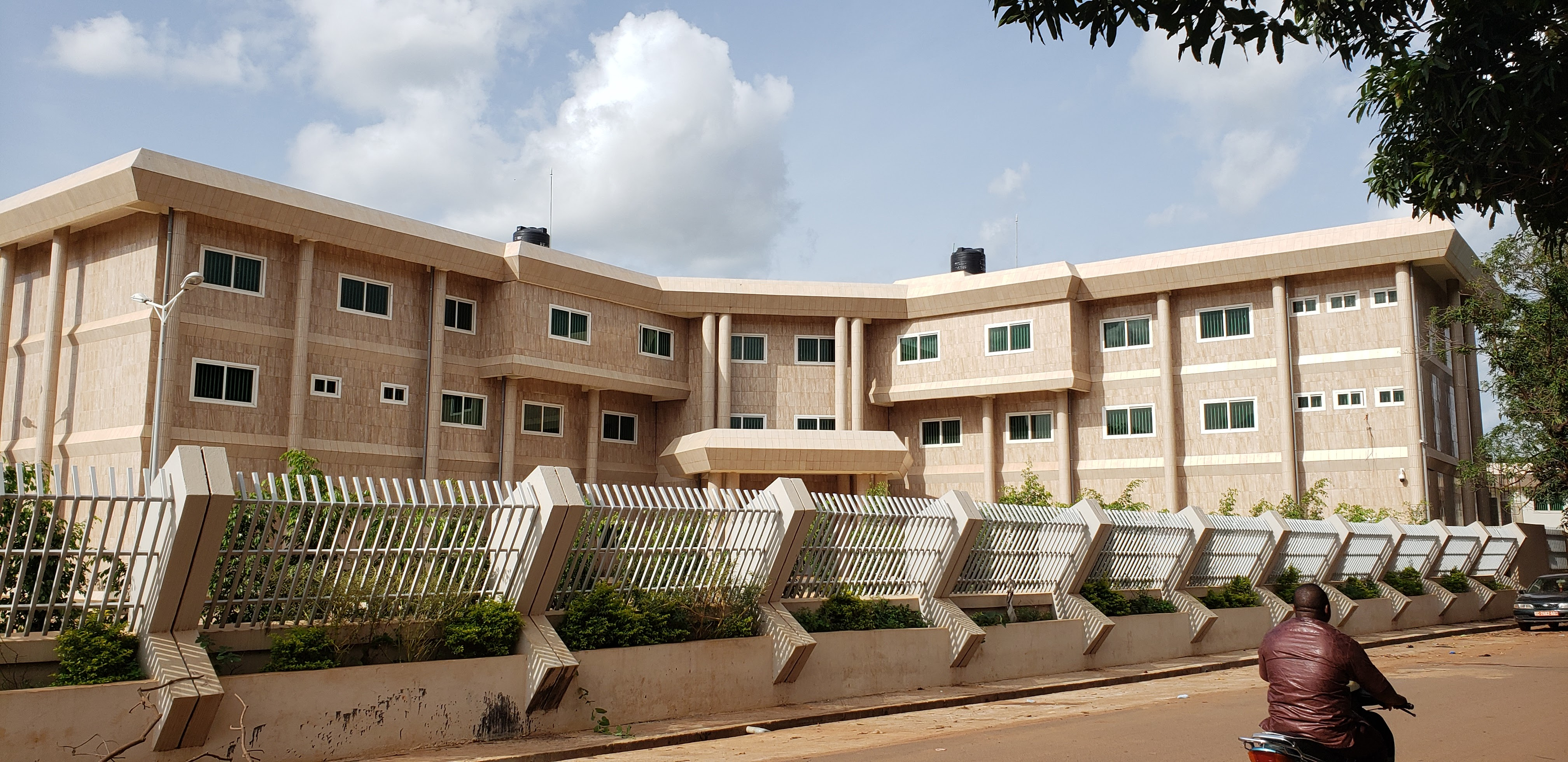
Central bank offices in Kankan.

The bank was established on 1 March 1960. Ousmane Baldé was president of the bank in the 1960s before his execution in 1971. In 1972 President Touré took over governorship of the Bank, formally attaching it to the Presidency.

=== Governors ===
Name	Took office	Left office	Notes
Moussa Diakité	1960	1963	
Ousmane Baldé	1963	1965	
Moussa Diakité	1965	1968	
Balla Camara	1969	1970	
Lamine Conde	1970	1981-?	
Kabiné Kaba	1984	?	
Aboubacar Kagbè Touré	?-1985	1985-?	
Kerfalla Yansané	1986	1996	
Ibrahima Chérif Bah	1996	2004	
Alkaly Mohammed Daffé	2004	2007	
Daouda Bangoura	2007	2009	
Alhassane Barry	2009	2010	
Louncény Nabé	2010	2021	
Karamo Kaba	2021		

== Activities ==
The Bank is active in promoting financial inclusion policy and is a leading member of the Alliance for Financial Inclusion. It is also one of the original 17 regulatory institutions to make specific national commitments to financial inclusion under the Maya Declaration during the 2011 Global Policy Forum held in Mexico.

== See also ==
- Economy of Guinea
- Guinean franc
- List of central banks of Africa
- List of central banks
- List of financial supervisory authorities by country
