= Fodé Mamoudou Touré =

French-Guinean politician (1910–1992)

Fodé Mamoudou Touré (April 1, 1910 in Baccoro, Guinea – April 11, 1992) was a politician from Guinea who served in the French Senate from 1955 to 1958. He was Minister of Economy and Finance of Guinea from 1972 to 1984.
