= Achkar Marof =

Guinean diplomat

Ambassador Achkar Marof (right), addresses a UN meeting in Rio de Janeiro, Brazil on 24/Aug/1966

Achkar Marof (1930-26 January, 1971) was a Guinean diplomat.

Marof was born in Coyah (Republic of Guinea) in 1930 and studied at the Ecole Breguet in Paris. He became deputy director of the Ballets Africains in 1954 and was appointed its director in 1957. He was the Guinea Permanent Representative to the United Nations, from 1964 to 1968. Marof was recalled to Conakry, Guinea in 1968, arrested and jailed at Camp Boiro. He briefly regained his freedom in the 1970 coup attempt. His family learned in 1985 that he had been shot on 26 January 1971.
