= Kerfalla Yansané =

Guinean lawyer and diplomat

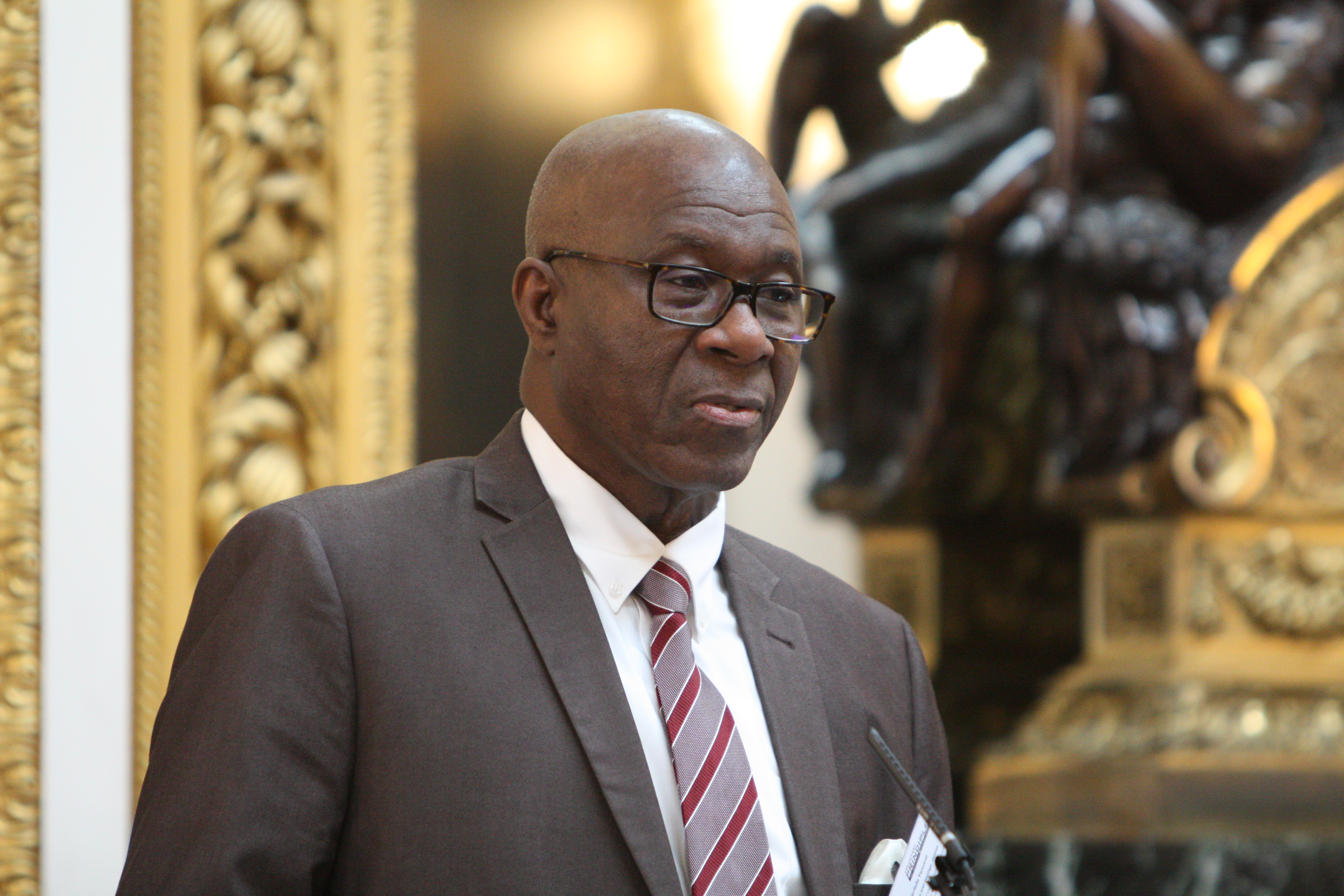
Yansané in 2015

Kerfalla Yansané is a Guinean diplomat serving as Ambassador of the Republic of Guinea in the United States since 2018.

A lawyer by training, he got his first position in the faculty of law at Dakar, and in 1985, was named Governor of the Central Bank of the Republic of Guinea. He initiated various reforms in this organisation. He was dismissed in 1996 after the military uprising. In 2010, he was reappointed by the transitional government directed by Prime Minister Jean Marie Doré and in December he was retained in his post by the new, democratically elected president, Alpha Condé. He was Minister of Economy and Finance from 2010 to 2014.

He was appointed ambassador on November 24, 2017. Two months later, Ambassador Yansané presented his credentials to President Donald Trump at the White House on January 24, 2018.
