= Operation Green Sea =

1970 Portuguese military attack on Guinea

Operation Green Sea 1970 Portuguese invasion of Guinea
- Part of Portuguese Colonial War and Guinea-Bissau War of Independence
- Operation Green Sea (Guinea)
Date	22 November 1970
Location	Conakry, Guinea
Result	See aftermath

Belligerents
Portugal (Guinea) FLNG	Guinea; PAIGC

Commanders and leaders
(Estado Novo (Portugal)) Alpoim Calvão (Estado Novo (Portugal)) António de Spínola (Estado Novo (Portugal)) Rebordão de Brito	(Guinea) Lansana Diané (surrendered)

Strength
220 soldiers 200 dissidents 3 patrol boats 2 landing craft	Unknown

Casualties and losses
1 soldier killed 7 dissidents killed	52–500 killed 26 Portuguese prisoners freed 5 supply ships destroyed numerous military/government buildings destroyed

Operation Green Sea (Portuguese: Operação Mar Verde), also known as the Battle of Conakry, was an amphibious attack on Conakry, the capital of Guinea, by between 350 and 420 Portuguese soldiers and Portuguese-led Guinean fighters in November 1970. The goals of the operation included the overthrow of Ahmed Sékou Touré's government, capture of the leader of the African Party for the Independence of Guinea and Cape Verde (PAIGC), Amílcar Cabral, destruction of the naval and air assets of the PAIGC and its Guinean supporters, and the rescue of Portuguese POWs held in Conakry.

The attackers withdrew after rescuing the POWs and destroying some PAIGC ships and Guinean Air Force infrastructure, but failed to capture Amílcar Cabral, the leader of PAIGC guerrillas (who was in Europe at the time), or to topple the regime of Guinean leader Ahmed Sékou Touré.

== Background ==
In 1952, Ahmed Sékou Touré became the leader of the Guinean Democratic Party (PDG). In 1957, Guinea had an election in which the PDG won 56 of 60 seats. The PDG conducted a plebiscite in September 1958 by which Guineans overwhelmingly opted for immediate independence rather than for continued association with France. The French withdrew and, on 2 October 1958, Guinea proclaimed itself a sovereign and independent republic with Touré as its president.

In 1960, Touré welcomed to Guinea and provided support to Amílcar Cabral and his organization, the PAIGC, which was seeking the independence of Portuguese Guinea (now Guinea-Bissau) and Cape Verde from the Portuguese Empire. In 1963, the PAIGC began the Guinea-Bissau War of Independence.

== Attack ==
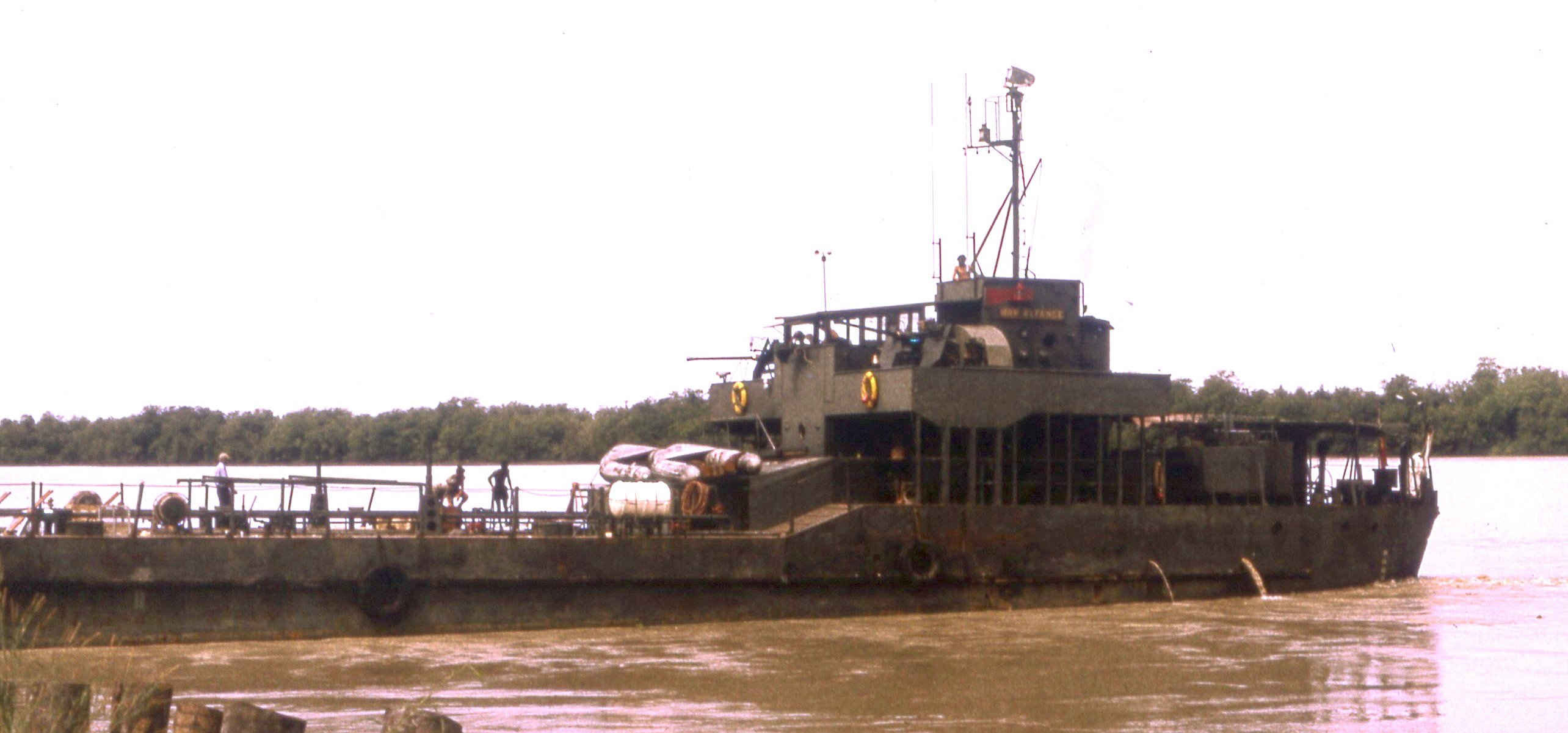
Portuguese Navy landing craft during the Portuguese Colonial War.

On the night of 21–22 November 1970 about 200 armed Guineans—attired in uniforms similar to those of the Guinean Army and commanded by Portuguese officers—and 220 African and European Portuguese soldiers invaded some points around Conakry. The soldiers disembarked from four unmarked ships, including an LST and a cargo vessel, and destroyed 4 or 5 PAIGC supply vessels. Others landed near President Touré's summer house, which they burnt. The invaders concentrated on destroying the headquarters of the African Party for the Independence of Guinea-Bissau and the Cape Verde Islands (Partido Africano da Independência da Guiné e do Cabo-Verde — PAIGC) in an unsuccessful attempt to capture PAIGC leader Amilcar Cabral, who was in Europe at the time. Others seized the political prison camps and liberated a number of prisoners, including 26 Portuguese POWs held at Camp Boiro, who had been captured earlier by PAIGC forces and turned over to the Guineans for safekeeping; some had been held captive in these camps for as long as seven years. The main attacking force reached but ignored the airport and apparently attacked what they thought was the operative radio station, unaware that its use had been discontinued when replaced earlier by a new station.

At this point, half of the invading force withdrew with the released prisoners to the waiting ships, leaving the task of overthrowing the Guinean government to a force estimated at fewer than 150 men. This group apparently hoped for an uprising by the population, but such a reaction failed to occur. Outside observers have speculated that public support was not achieved because the invaders failed to seize the right radio station, which continued to operate under government control. Moreover, most important government or party officials avoided capture. Since both Cabral and Touré couldn't be found, the Portuguese raiders retreated after suffering minor casualties.

== Consequences ==
=== Internal purges in Guinea ===
Within a week of the invasion, Touré set up a ten-person committee: the Haut-Commandement (High Command). Staffed with loyal members of the Political Bureau, the High Command ran Guinea by decree. The High Command oversaw arrests, detentions without trial, and executions. The High Command's actions decimated the ranks of government and police officials. Notable among the victims were the President of the Central Bank of the Republic of Guinea and the Minister of Finance Ousmane Baldé. After a five-day trial, on 23 January 1971, the Supreme Revolutionary Tribunal ordered 29 executions (carried out three days later), 33 death sentences in absentia, 68 life sentences at hard labour, and 17 orders of confiscation of all property.

The captured Guinean nationals who joined the Portuguese-African troops and had defected to the Portuguese side of the operation received life sentences at hard labour in Guinea. Eighty-nine of those charged were released, but dissidents say some people "disappeared" into prison or were executed extrajudicially. Those sentenced to execution included members of the governing party (including the neighbourhood party chiefs in Conakry), Conakry's Chief of Police, a secretary to the President, an assistant minister of finance, and at least five Guinean soldiers. Those who had their property confiscated were either French or Lebanese. The fate of other Europeans who were arrested is unknown. Among those who received life sentences were former government Ministers, heads of state industries, a former regional governor, and the top two officials of the National Museum.

In July 1971, Touré purged the army of some of its officers. In April 1973, he purged his regime of some of its ministers.

=== Political condemnation ===
On 8 December 1970, the UN Security Council passed Resolution 290, which condemned Portugal for the invasion of Guinea, and called upon Portugal to respect the principles of self-determination and independence with regard to Portuguese Guinea. On 11 December 1970, the Organization of African Unity (OAU) passed a resolution unanimously condemning the invasion.

Nigeria and Algeria offered support to Guinea-Conakry and the Soviet Union sent warships to the area (known by NATO as the West Africa Patrol) to prevent further military operations against Touré's regime and against the PAIGC bases in Guinea.

== See also ==
- António de Spínola: Governor of Portuguese Guinea at the time.
- Frente Leste
- Operation Gordian Knot
- Operation Ivory Coast, a similar raid by the U.S. Army into North Vietnam to rescue American POW's
- Portuguese Colonial War
- United Nations Security Council Resolution 290
- United Nations Security Council Resolution 295: 3 August 1971 resolution regarding continued border incursions.
