= Fodéba Keïta =

Guinean entertainer and politician (1921–1969)

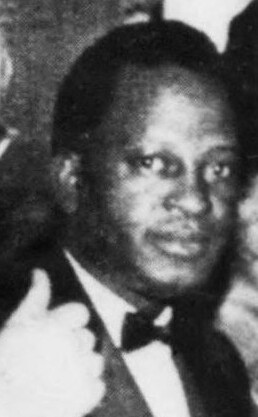
- Keïta in 1959

Minister of Defense
- In office 1961–1969

Personal details
- Born: January 19, 1921 Siguiri, Guinea
- Died: May 27, 1969 (aged 48) Camp Boiro, Guinea
- Occupation: Dancer, musician, writer, playwright, composer and politician

Fodéba Keïta (January 19, 1921 – May 27, 1969) was a Guinean dancer, musician, writer, playwright, composer and politician. Founder of the first professional African theatrical troupe, Theatre Africain, he also arranged "Liberté", the national anthem of Guinea.

== Early years ==
Born in Siguiri, Keïta was the son of a male nurse. He received his early education at the École normale supérieure William Ponty.

== Career ==
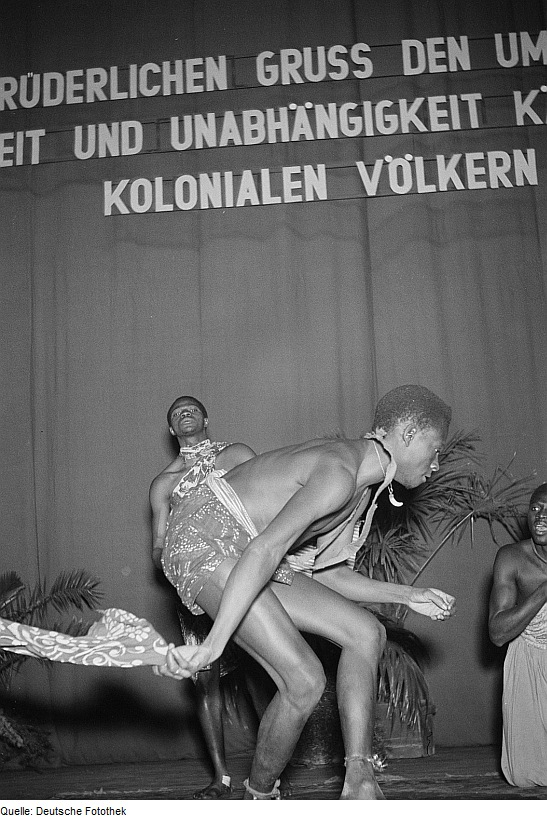
An ensemble directed by Fodéba Keïta performing in Germany (1951)

During his law studies in Paris in 1948, he founded the band Sud Jazz. Beginning in the late 1940s, he founded Théâtre Africain (later Les Ballets Africains), a successful ballet group which toured Africa for six years and later became the national dance company of Guinea; then president of Senegal Léopold Sédar Senghor held it in high esteem. With Kanté Facély and Les Ballets Africains, he became instrumental in showcasing previously unknown Mandé performance traditions to other continents as well.

After returning to Guinea, he published the poetry collection Poèmes africains (1950), the novel Le Maître d'école (1952), and in 1957, Keïta wrote and staged the narrative poem Aube africaine ("African Dawn") as a theatre-ballet based on the Thiaroye massacre. In African Dawn, a young man called Naman complies with the French colonial rulers by fighting in the French Army only to be killed in Thiaroye in Senegal, in a dispute between West-African soldiers and white officers. However, his works were banned in French Africa as he was considered radical and anticolonial.

Politically active in the African Democratic Rally, Keïta worked closely with Guinea's first president Sékou Touré from 1956, and in 1957 was elected to the Territorial Assembly. In 1961, Keïta was appointed minister for defense and security. He uncovered alleged plots against Sékou Touré, but was imprisoned in the infamous Camp Boiro, a prison he himself helped construct, for alleged complicity in the February 1969 Labé Plot, and was subjected to torture (diète noire – complete food and fluid withdrawal).

On May 27, 1969, he was shot dead without trial.
