= Diallo Telli =

Guinean diplomat and politician (1925–1977)

Representative of Guinea at the United Nations
- In office September 1958 – June 1964

Secretary General of the Organisation of African Unity
- In office 21 July 1964 – 15 June 1972
- Preceded by: Kifle Wodajo
- Succeeded by: Nzo Ekangaki

Minister of Justice of Guinea
- In office 21 August 1972 – 18 July 1976
- Preceded by: Sikhé Camara
- Succeeded by: Lansana Diané

Personal details
- Born: 1925 Porédaka, Guinea, French West Africa
- Died: February 1977 (aged 51–52) Camp Boiro, Guinea

Boubacar Diallo Telli (1925 – February 1977) was a Guinean diplomat and politician. He helped found the Organisation of African Unity (OAU) and was the second secretary-general of the OAU between 1964 and 1972. After serving as Minister of Justice in Guinea for four years he was executed by starvation by the regime of Ahmed Sékou Touré at Camp Boiro in 1977.

== Early career ==
Diallo Telli was born in 1925 in Porédaka, Guinea. He was of Fulani origin. He studied at École normale supérieure William Ponty. He studied for his baccalauréat at Dakar, and then went to the École Nationale de la France d'Outre-Mer, in Paris, France. In 1951 he received his Licence en Droit, and in 1954 his Doctorate in Law. That year he was appointed Deputy of the Procureur (District Attorney) of the Republic at the Court of Thiès in Senegal. He was then appointed to the court in Cotonou, Benin (then Dahomey). In 1955, he became head of the Office of High Commissioner of French West Africa (AOF) in Dakar, which was the highest position held by an African in the French colonial period. He became Secretary General of the AOF in April 1957 and remained in that post for eighteen months.

== Diplomatic career ==
After the referendum of 28 September 1958, in which Guinea chose independence from French West Africa, Telli was sent to the United States as Permanent Representative of Guinea at the United Nations. He held that position until June 1964 with a break between June 1960 and March 1961. He was also Ambassador to the United States from April 1959 to June 1961.

Telli held the position of second Secretary General of OAU, holding that office for two terms from July 1964 until June 1972. The job was extremely challenging for him, as he expressed it involved negotiating a common viewpoint among the many leaders of African states, each of whom had divergent opinions. In an article published in the Fall of 1965, Telli acknowledged the difficulties and disputes but asserted that the organization had a flexible enough structure to deal with these problems, and asked what would have happened if there had been no OAU.

At times Telli was criticized for his outspokenness. Some criticized him for pushing Sékou Touré's views too strongly. In July 1968 it was reported that he was unlikely to be appointed for a second term since he had not shown neutrality. A report on the OAU summit in Algiers in September 1968 covered Telli's position on the Nigerian Civil War. Although the members generally supported Federal Nigeria, some countries such as Ivory Coast, Tanzania, Zambia and Gabon recognized Biafra. Overall, Telli was a strong and respected spokesman for the OAU.

== Minister of Justice ==
In June 1972, Telli was succeeded by Nzo Ekangaki of Cameroon as OAU Secretary-General. Telli returned to Guinea and was appointed Minister of Justice on 21 August 1972. His decision to return to Guinea was puzzling. He had many other offers from African heads of state and international organizations. He would also be in danger. Some people in Guinea even thought that Sékou Touré had used occult means to lure him back. According to Andre Lewin, Touré's biographer, Telli was the only person who could potentially challenge Touré in his Presidency. Therefore, Touré felt a special need to destroy him.

As Minister of Justice, at a conference at the University of Conakry, he stated that justice was the key that opened all doors, and urged students to pursue legal studies. However, Telli obeyed party directives and was the author of the law of June 1973 that removed all independence from the judiciary, creating people's courts at the village and neighborhood levels. His technical counselor at the time said that Telli was "naive, very nervous, often super-exited, very careless in his words and actions, full of candor and disordered in his work." After the reconciliation between France and Guinea in July 1975, Sékou Touré suggested, at a meal celebrating the occasion, that Telli could be a suitable candidate to be Secretary-General of the United Nations.

== Death ==
On 18 July 1976, Diallo Telli was arrested at his home and imprisoned at Camp Boiro. Mamadi Keïta, the President's brother-in-law, was head of the commission of inquiry that condemned Telli. Telli was accused of leading a plot by Fulanis against the state of Guinea. He was subjected to intense interrogations, torture and an inadequate diet. After the second torture session, Telli was shattered and agreed to sign a "confession" of his treason. This was an incoherent document even after editing by the tribunal. In February 1977 five prominent prisoners were killed through the "black diet" (no food or water): Diallo Telli, ex-ministers Barry Alpha Oumar and Dramé Alioune, and army officers Diallo Alhassana and Kouyate Laminé. The OAU did not react to the death of its former Secretary General. However, the disappearance of Telli, a widely respected international diplomat known for his dignity and good nature, did contribute to growing international awareness of the abuses of the Touré regime.
