= Kindia =

Kindia ߞߌ߲ߘߌߦߊ߫ (Eastern Maninkakan)
- Sub-prefecture and town
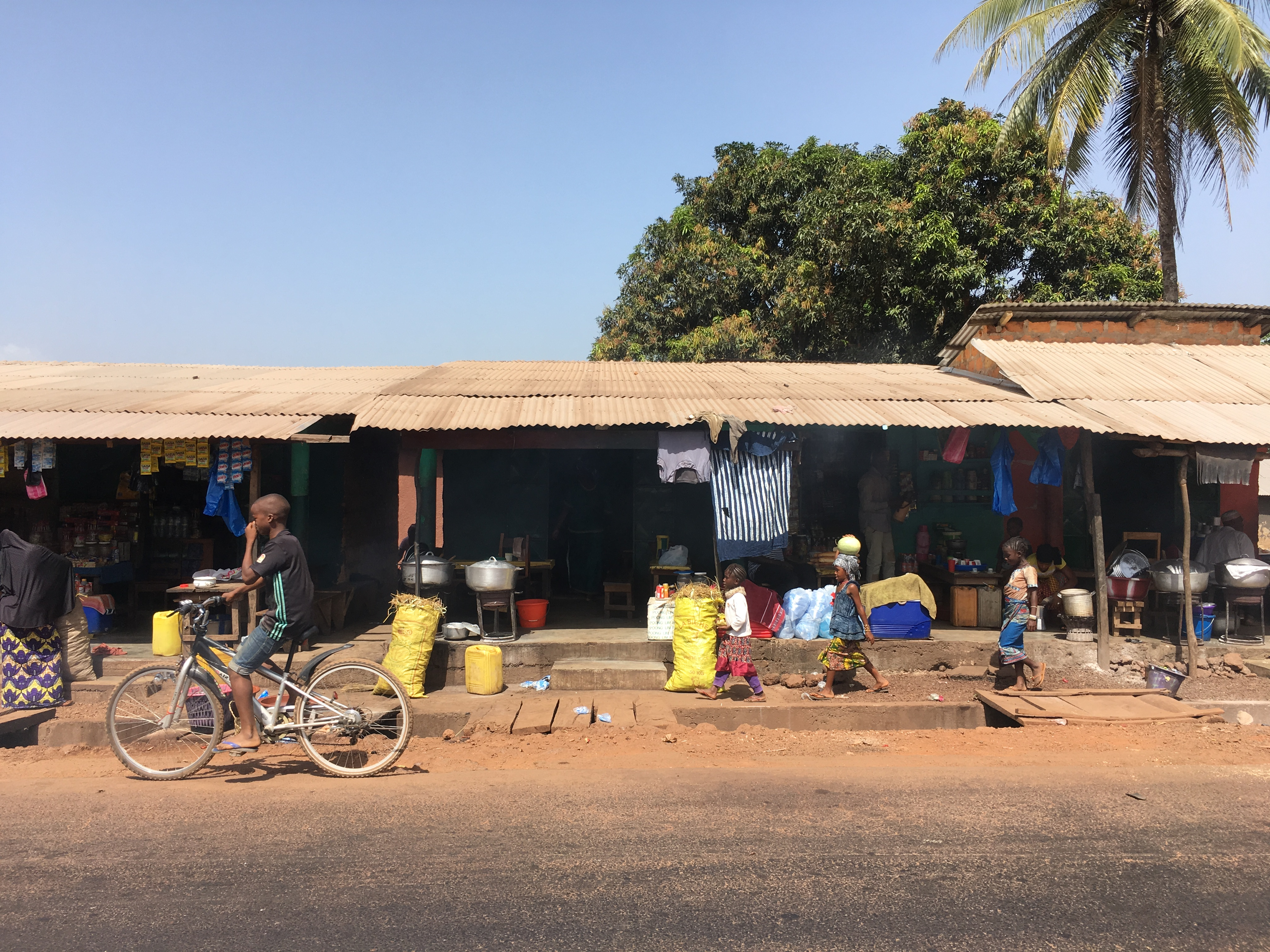

- Location within Guinea
- Coordinates: 10°02′59″N 12°51′15″W
- Country: Guinea
- Region: Kindia Region
- Prefecture: Kindia Prefecture

Government
  - Mayor: Mamadouba Bangoura

Population (2008)
  - Total: 181,126

Kindia (N’ko: ߞߌ߲ߘߌߦߊ߫) is the fourth largest city in Guinea, located about 85 miles (137 km) northeast of the nation's capital, Conakry. Its estimated population in 2008 was 181,126. Kindia serves as the capital and largest city of Kindia Prefecture and Kindia Region. It also functions as a sub-prefecture of Guinea.

== Geography ==
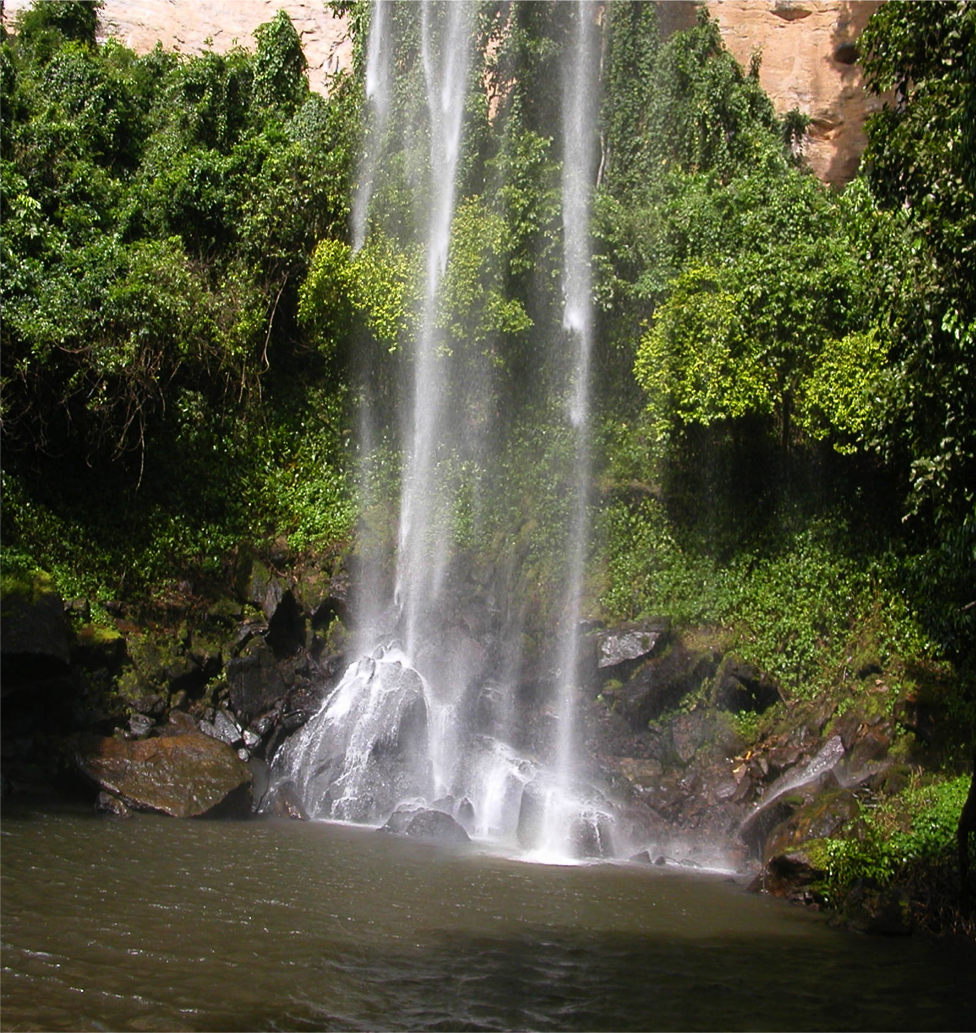
Mariée Falls

The city is near Mount Gangan and the Mariée Falls.

== History ==
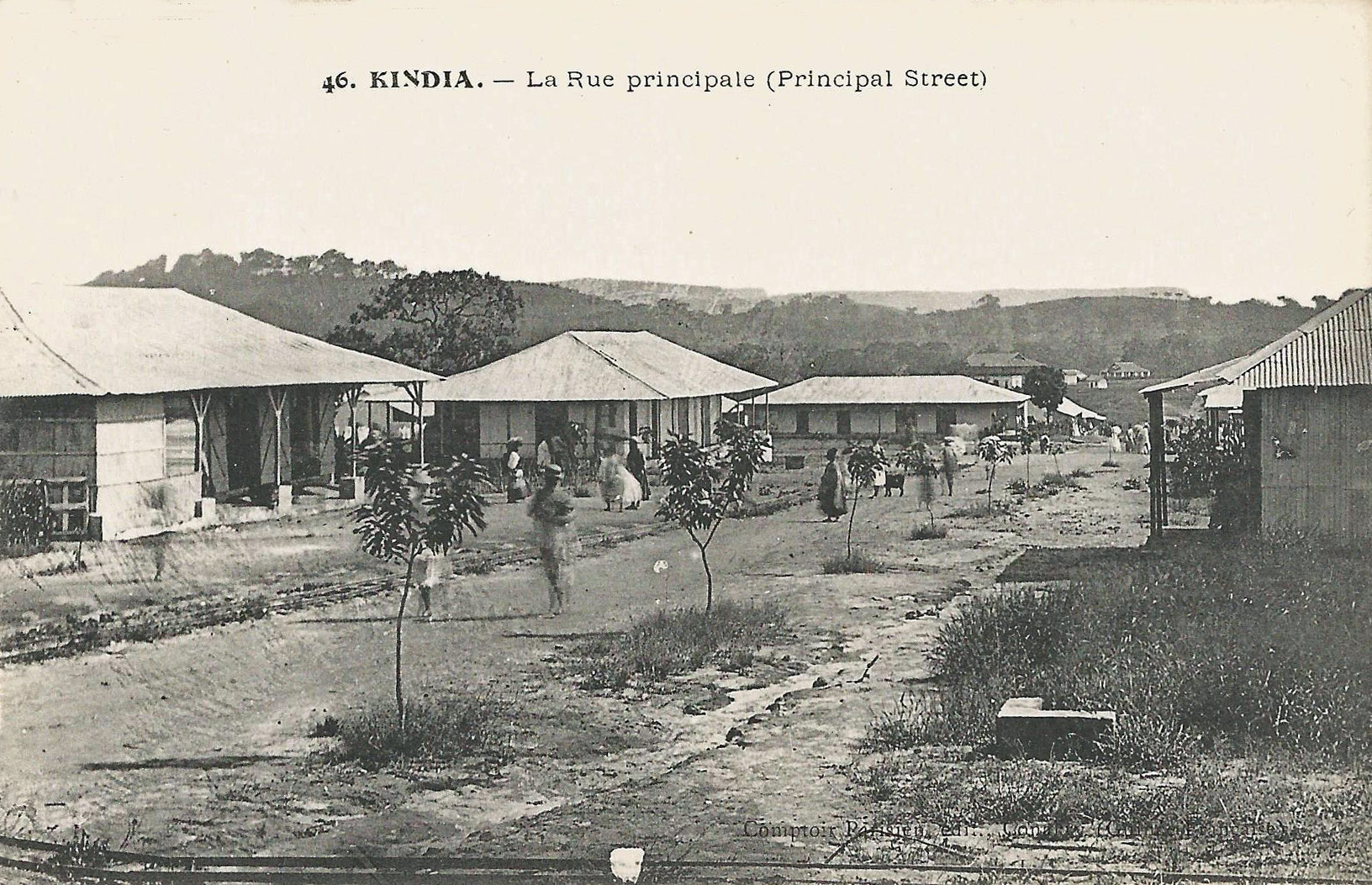
Main street in 1905

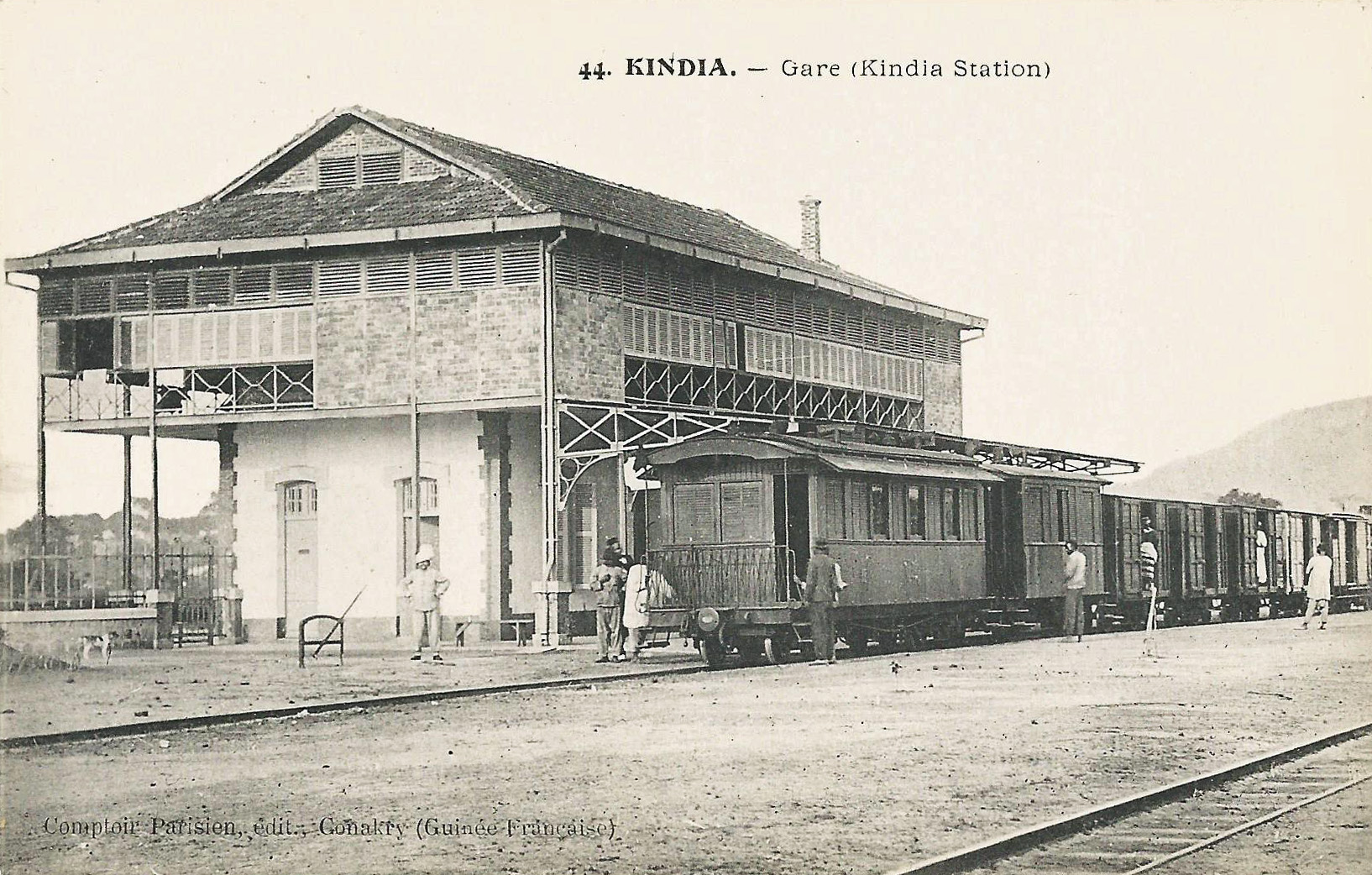
Station in 1905

The city was founded in 1904 on the route of Conakry Railway in Kankan.

In October 2002, mass graves were discovered near Kindia containing hundreds of bodies. Most of the victims were killed on 17 and 18 October 1971 by Touré's regime. One grave reportedly contained 400 bodies.

== Economy ==
Kindia grew around banana plantations following the construction of a now-closed railway to the capital.

== Demography ==
The city of Kindia has an ethnically diverse population, although the Susu make up the majority of the population, followed by the Mandinka. The city is home to virtually all of the country's ethnic groups. After the capital Conakry, Kindia is home to the second largest Sierra Leonean community in Guinea. An estimated 9,000 Sierra Leoneans reside in the city, many of them have obtain Guinean citizenship. Like every city in Western Guinea, including the capital Conakry, the Susu language is the most widely spoken language in Kindia and is understood by virtually the entire population.

== Climate ==
Kindia has a tropical savanna climate (Köppen climate classification Aw).

Climate data for Kindia (1991–2020)
Month	Jan	Feb	Mar	Apr	May	Jun	Jul	Aug	Sep	Oct	Nov	Dec	Year
Mean daily maximum °C (°F)	32.5 (90.5)	34.7 (94.5)	35.9 (96.6)	35.3 (95.5)	32.7 (90.9)	29.6 (85.3)	27.9 (82.2)	27.4 (81.3)	28.8 (83.8)	29.8 (85.6)	30.8 (87.4)	31.7 (89.1)	31.4 (88.5)
Daily mean °C (°F)	26.2 (79.2)	27.7 (81.9)	28.7 (83.7)	28.7 (83.7)	27.3 (81.1)	25.4 (77.7)	24.4 (75.9)	24.1 (75.4)	24.8 (76.6)	25.3 (77.5)	25.9 (78.6)	25.8 (78.4)	26.2 (79.2)
Mean daily minimum °C (°F)	19.9 (67.8)	20.6 (69.1)	21.6 (70.9)	22.1 (71.8)	21.9 (71.4)	21.2 (70.2)	20.8 (69.4)	20.8 (69.4)	20.8 (69.4)	20.8 (69.4)	21.1 (70.0)	19.9 (67.8)	21.0 (69.8)
Average precipitation mm (inches)	1.6 (0.06)	3.5 (0.14)	10.7 (0.42)	63.9 (2.52)	165.6 (6.52)	262.3 (10.33)	380.4 (14.98)	481.5 (18.96)	363.3 (14.30)	239.1 (9.41)	51.6 (2.03)	2.6 (0.10)	2,026.1 (79.77)
Average precipitation days (≥ 1.0 mm)	0.3	0.3	0.9	4.0	10.3	16.0	21.6	25.9	22.0	17.1	3.6	0.2	122.2
Average relative humidity (%)	47	45	48	55	69	80	84	86	82	80	73	57	67
Mean monthly sunshine hours	247	237	262	230	197	148	106	81	127	163	189	236	2,223
Source: NOAA (humidity, sun 1961–1990)
