= List of Fula people =

List of ethnic Fulani people

This is a list of notable Fulanis.

== Nigeria ==
=== Academics and Islamic scholars ===
- Muhammad Ibn Muhammad Al-Fulani Al-Kishwani – prominent mathematician in the early 1700s from Katsina
- Usman dan Fodio (1754–1817) – Islamic scholar, revolutionary from Sokoto, founder and spiritual leader of the Sokoto Caliphate.
- Abdullahi dan Fodio (1766–1829) – scholar, jurist, pioneer, Grand Vizier of Sokoto and first Emir of Gwandu (r. 1812–1828).
- Nana Asma'u – princess, poet, Islamic scholar and daughter of Usman dan Fodio.
- Muhammed Bello (1781–1837) – the first sultan of Sokoto.
- Abd al-Qadir dan Tafa (1804–1864) – described as the "most learned scholar of his time" in the Sokoto Caliphate who specialized in philosophy (Falsafa)
- Abu Bakr Atiku (1782–1842) – second sultan of the Sokoto Caliphate, reigning from October 1837 until November 1842.
- Muhammadu Junaidu – former grand vizier of Sokoto, historian, writer
- Hayatu ibn Sa'id - great-grandson of Usman dan Fodio, Mahdist leader who attempted to conquer Bornu and The Sokoto Caliphate.
- Muhammad Bukhari bin Uthman - military commander, scholar and poet. Son Of Usman dan Fodio.
- Modibbo Adama (1786–1847) – first Laamiɗo and founder of Fombina (Adamawa emirate) which covered parts of Nigeria, Cameroon and Chad.
- Modibbo Raji – influential 19th century Islamic scholar who is generally regarded as the founder of the Islamic scholarly tradition in Adamawa;Wazir(vizier) in the Gwandu Emirate of the Sokoto Caliphate
- Muhammad Auwal Albani Zaria - prominent Islamic scholar and reformer.
- Isa Ali Pantami - Islamic scholar, former Minister of Communications and Digital economy.
- Ibrahim Ahmad Maqary - Professor of Arabic and linguistics, Current Co-imam of the Abuja National Mosque.
- Iya Abubakar – Professor of Mathematics at Ahmadu Bello University at the age of 28, first Northern-Nigerian to earn a PhD in any field, former vice-chancellor of Ahmadu Bello University
- R. A. B. Dikko - first Medical Doctor from Northern Nigeria.
- Mahmud Modibbo Tukur (1944–1988) -Nigerian historian, scholar and the 4th National President of the Academic Staff Union of universities (ASUU)
- Muhammad Ali Pate – CEO GAVI; Global Director for Health, Nutrition and Population at the World Bank, professor at Harvard Chan School; former Minister of State for Health, Current Minister Of Health.
- Mustafa Shehu - first person from Sub-Sahara Africa to be elected president of the World Federation of Engineering Organizations.
- Umar Garba - professor of electrical and telecommunications engineering, former executive vice-chairman and chief executive Officer of Nigerian Communications Commission
- Abdul Ganiyu Ambali - veterinary doctor, former vice- chancellor of University of Ilorin.
- Ibrahim Abubakar - professor of infectious disease epidemiology at University College London, vice provost (health).
- Fatima Batul Mukhtar - professor of botany, vice- chancellor Azman University.
- Bello Shehu - neurosurgeon, former chief medical director of the Usman Danfodiyo University Teaching Hospital, Sokoto, National Hospital, Abuja and Medical Director, Federal Medical Centre, Birnin-Kebbi, vice chancellor of The Federal University Birnin-Kebbi.
- Usman Yusuf - professor of hematology-oncology and bone marrow transplantation, former chief executive officer of the National Health Insurance Scheme (NHIS).
- Bello Bako Dambatta - professor of chemistry, vice chancellor Bayero University kano.
- Aisha Maikudi - professor of international law, vice chancellor University of Abuja, youngest female vice-chancellor at the age of 41.
- Hadiza Galadanci - professor of obstetrics and gynecology at Bayero University, Kano, director of the World Bank Africa Center of Excellence for Population Health and Policy.
- Muhammad Yahuza Bello - professor of mathematics, 10th vice-chancellor Bayero University kano
- Fatima Tahir - professor of microbiology, vice-chancellor of Bauchi State University.
- Ibrahim Umar (physicist) - professor of physics, 3rd vice chancellor Bayero University kano.
- Abubakar Sani Sambo - former director-general of Energy Commission of Nigeria (ECN), former vice chancellor of Abubakar Tafawa Balewa University.
- Mahmud Tukur - first vice chancellor Of Bayero University Kano, former minister of commerce and industry.
- Aisha Mahmoud Hamman - professor in the Department of Accounting and Finance at Ahmadu Bello University, Zaria
- Haruna Musa - professor of chemistry, vice-chancellor Bayero University Kano.
- Abba Gumel - professor & The Michael and Eugenia Brin Endowed E-Nnovate Chair in Mathematics at the Department of Mathematics, University of Maryland.
- Fatimah Tuggar - professor of AI in Arts, University of Florida.
- Ibrahim Tahir - Nigerian sociologist, writer, and politician during the Second Republic and a prominent member of the Kaduna Mafia.
- Mahmud Modibbo Tukur – historian, author, Marxist and the 4th Academic Staff Union of Universities National President of ASUU.
- Jubril Aminu – former senator of Adamawa; Pioneer Cardiac Surgeon; former minister of education/petroleum and mineral resources, former president OPEC Conference.
- Yusufu Bala Usman – historian, writer, and Marxist.

=== Politicians and administrators ===
- Sir Abubakar Tafawa Balewa (Gere/Fulani) – Nigerian politician and the first prime minister of an independent Nigeria.
- Ahmadu Bello – Sardauna of Sokoto and first premier of Northern Region of Nigeria.
- Shehu Shagari – Turaki of Sokoto and the first elected president of Nigeria.
- Major-General Mohammadu Buhari – former president and former Head of State of Nigeria.
- Umaru Musa Yar'Adua – former president of Nigeria.
- Namadi Sambo - former vice president of Nigeria
- Aminu Kano – politician and teacher.
- Atiku Abubakar – former vice president of Nigeria.
- Muhammadu Abubakar Rimi – former governor of Kano State, politician.
- Rabiu Kwankwaso – former governor of Kano State, Nigeria, former minister of defence.
- Abdullahi Umar Ganduje – former governor of Kano State, Nigeria.
- Nasir Ahmad el-Rufai – former governor of Kaduna State, former minister of federal capital.
- Isa Yuguda - economist, former Minister of Aviation, former governor of Bauchi State.
- Abubakar Atiku Bagudu – former governor of Kebbi State, Senate Second Republic, Nigeria.
- Sule Lamido – former governor of Jigawa State, Nigeria, former minister of foreign affairs.
- Aliyu Magatakarda Wamakko – former governor of Sokoto State and current senator of Sokoto North.
- Danbaba Suntai - former governor Of Taraba State.
- Dikko Umar Radda - Governor of Katsina State.
- Gidado Idris – former secretary to the Government of The Federation.
- Muhammadu Dikko Yusufu - former Inspector General of Police.
- Aisha Abubakar Abdulwahab - veterinary doctor, Police officer, First Female president of the Veterinary council of Nigeria, Assistant Inspector-General of the Nigerian Police.
- Lamido Yuguda - Former director general of the Securities and Exchange Commission, Deputy Governor Central Bank of Nigeria.
- Muhammad Sani Abdullahi - Former Kaduna State Commissioner for Budget and Planning, Deputy Governor(Economic Policy) Central Bank of Nigeria.
- Abdulkadir Ahmed - economist, longest serving Governor of the Central Bank of Nigeria between 1982 - 1993.
- Abubakar Koko - administrator, First Executive Secretary of the Federal Capital Development Authority (FCDA), Abuja, planned and executed Nigeria's new capital, Sarkin Yakin Gwandu.
- Bello Maitama Yusuf - GCON, former minister of interior, Commerce, Social Welfare, Youth, Sports and Culture.
- Abdullahi Yusuf Ribadu - Executive secretary National Universities Commission (NUC), former VC Modibbo Adama Federal University of Technology, Yola.
- Hamza Rafindadi Zayyad - former managing director New Nigeria Development Company, former Head Of Nigeria Privatization Committee.
- Shamsudeen Usman - economist, former deputy governor (operations, Financial Stability) Central Bank of Nigeria, former minister of national planning, former minister of finance, former president Nigerian Economic society, Founder Nigerian Sovereign Wealth Fund (NSIA).
- Nuhu Ribadu – current national security adviser and pioneer executive chairman of Nigeria's Economic and Financial Crimes Commission (EFCC).
- Ibrahim Jalo - first indigenous full term to be Speaker of House of Representatives of Nigeria.
- Abubakar Alhaji - economist, former high commissioner to the United Kingdom, former Minister OF Finance and Planning, Sardauna of Sokoto.
- Abdullahi Dikko - economist, former Comptroller-General Of Nigeria Customs Service.
- Idi Mukhtar Maiha - former managing director of Kaduna Refining and Petrochemical Company (KRPC), Minister of Livestock Development.
- Zainab Ahmed - Minister of Finance, Budget and National Planning, executive director of the World Bank.
- Adamu Bello - economist, former Minister Of Agriculture and Rural Development.
- Abdullahi Baffa Bichi - former Executive Secretary Tertiary Education Trust Fund, former Kano SSG.
- Tanimu Yakubu Kurfi - Former managing director/Chief Executive Officer of the Federal Mortgage Bank of Nigeria, Director General, Budget office of the Federation
- Suwaiba Ahmad - Minister of State for Education.
- Muhammadu Gambo Jimeta - former Inspector General of Police.
- Aisha Shehu Adamu - Medical Consultant, current Chief Medical Director of Federal Medical Centre, Jalingo.
- Bashir Dalhatu - former Minister of Power and Steel, Interior. Wazirin Dutse.
- Bukhari Bello - former Executive Secretary of Nigeria's National Human Rights Commission (NHRC).
- Babangida Nguroje - former Deputy Speaker Of the House Of Representatives.
- Aliyu Modibbo Umar – former Minister of State, Power and Steel (2002–2003), former Minister of Commerce and Industry (2006–2007), former Minister of Federal Capital Territory, Abuja (2007–2008).
- Rilwanu Lukman- former Minister of Petroleum Resources and Mines, Power, Steel; and former secretary general OPEC.
- Maikanti Baru - engineer, former GMD Of NNPC Limited.
- Mohammed Bello-Koko - former managing director of the Nigerian Ports Authority
- Muhammed Babandede - former Comptroller General (CG) of the Nigeria Immigration Service NIS.
- Ahmad Salihijo Ahmad - former managing director of Nigerian Rural Electrification Agency.
- M.T. Usman - former permanent secretary ministry of Works.
- Abubakar Dantsoho - Managing Director of the Nigerian Ports Authority (NPA).
- Hamman Bello - former Comptroller- General Of Nigeria Customs Service.
- Musa Yar'Adua - Minister of Lagos Affairs 1960 -1966, Matawalle of the Katsina Emirate.
- Muhammadu Ribadu – first minister of defence after independence, founder of the Nigerian Defence Academy.
- Mansur Muhtar – economist, former Nigerian Federal minister of finance (2008 -2010), former director World Bank, presently vice chairman, Islamic Development Bank.
- Tajudeen Abbas - Speaker of the House of Representatives of Nigeria.
- Abubakar Olusola Saraki – (Fulani/Yoruba); former president of the Senate.
- Gbemisola Ruqayyah Saraki – (Fulani/Yoruba); former Senator Kwara Central, current Minister of State. Transportation of the Federal Republic of Nigeria. Nigeria.
- Aisha Dikko - former attorney general, commissioner of Justice Kaduna.
- Bukola Saraki – (Fulani/Yoruba); former president of the Nigerian Senate; former Governor of Kwara State and former Senator Kwara Central, Nigeria.
- Captain Muhammad Bala Shagari – politician, former Nigerian Army officer. Current Sarkin Mafaran Shagari and District Head of Shagari Local Government, Nigeria.
- Mohammed Bello (jurist) – jurist and statesman who was the chief justice of Nigeria from 1987 to 1995.
- Mohammed Uwais - jurist and former chief justice of Nigeria from 1995 to 2006.
- Salihu Modibbo Alfa Belgore - jurist and former chief justice of Nigeria from 2006 to 2007.
- Mahmud Mohammed - jurist and former chief justice of Nigeria from 2014 to 2016
- Tanko Muhammad - jurist and former chief justice of Nigeria from 2019 to 2022.
- Zainab Adamu Bulkachuwa - first female president of the Nigerian Courts of Appeal.
- Mamman Nasir - former justice of the Supreme Court, former president Of the Courts Of Appeal.
- Shehu Atiku - former Chief Judge Kano state High Court.
- Usman Bayero Nafada - former Deputy Speaker of the House of Representatives of Nigeria.
- Aishatu Dahiru "Binani"– Senator Adamawa Central; APC Governatorial Candidate.
- Hadiza Bala Usman - former managing director of Nigerian Ports Authority.
- Shehu Dikko- Sports Administrator, former chairman league management company, chairman National Sports Commission.
- Yahaya Dikko - former general manager of NEPA, former president of OPEC.
- Abdullahi Aliyu Sumaila – politician and administrator.
- Aliyu Ibrahim Gebi - security expert, former member of the House of Representatives.

=== Military figures ===
- Major-General Hassan Katsina - last Military Governor of Northern Nigeria and former Chief of Army Staff
- General Murtala Mohammed – former Head of State of Nigeria.
- Major-General Shehu Musa Yar'Adua – former Deputy Head of State.
- Major-General Tunde Idiagbon – (Fulani/Yoruba); former Deputy Head of State.
- Lieutenant-General Aliyu Mohammed Gusau - former chief of Defence Intelligence, former director of the National Security Organisation, former GOC of 2 Mechanised Division , former commandant of the Nigerian Defence Academy, former Chief of Army Staff, former Nigerian National Security Adviser, former minister of defence.
- Lieutenant-General Abdulrahman Bello Dambazau – retired Nigerian Army Lieutenant-General and Nigeria's former minister of the interior. Dambazau served as Chief of Army Staff (COAS) between 2008 and 2010.
- Colonel Mohammed Kaliel - former commander Guards Brigade, first governor of Bauchi State.
- Vice-Admiral Murtala Nyako - former Chief of the Naval Staff (Nigeria), Military Governor of Niger State and Civilian governor of Adamawa State.
- Brigadier GeneralMohammed Buba Marwa - former Military Governor of Borno and Lagos State, Chairman of National Drug Law Enforcement Agency.
- Vice-Admiral Awwal Zubairu Gambo - Retired Nigerian Navy Vice-Admiral, former Chief of Naval Staff.
- Colonel Lawan Gwadabe -former Commander of the National Guards (Guards Brigade), former chief of staff Gambian Army.
- Air Marshal Sadique Abubakar - former Chief of Air Staff.
- Ali Jedo - The first Amir al-jaish al-Islam (supreme commander of the army or Sarkin Yaki) of the Sokoto Caliphate.

=== Diplomats ===
- Hamzat Ahmadu - Nigerian diplomat, former ambassador to the Soviet Union, the United States of America and high commissioner to the Bahamas.
- Nuhu Bamalli - Former minister of foreign affairs
- Mohammed Sanusi Barkindo – 28th Secretary-General of OPEC.
- Ibrahim Gambari – (Fulani/Yoruba); Scholar and diplomat; Chief of Staff to the president; Under-Secretary-General / Special Adviser – Africa United Nations; former minister of foreign affairs, current chief of staff to the president of Nigeria.
- Amina J. Mohammed – (Fulani/English); Politician; Deputy Secretary-General of the United Nations; former Federal Minister of Environment, Nigeria.
- Tijjani Muhammad-Bande – Political scientist, administrator and career diplomat. Current president of the United Nations General Assembly, Permanent Representative of Nigeria to the UN, former VP of the UN General Assembly.
- Nura Abba Rimi - Nigeria's ambassador to the Arab Republic of Egypt, with concurrent accreditation to the State of Palestine and the State of Eritrea; former Presidential Liaison Officer.
- Ibrahim Sulu-Gambari – (Fulani/Yoruba); Nigerian judge and monarch. Current Emir of Ilorin, Nigeria.
- Yusuf Tuggar – Minister of Foreign Affairs.
- Aminu Bashir Wali - Former permanent representative to the United Nations, former minister of foreign affairs.
- Isa Wali - former Nigerian high commissioner to Ghana.

=== Traditional and religious leaders ===
- Brigadier-General Sa'adu Abubakar – Sultan of Sokoto.
- Ibrahim Dabo – Emir of Kano (1819–46).
- Muhammadu Attahiru I - The last independent Sultan of Sokoto before the Caliphate was taken over by the British.
- Muhammadu Dikko – Emir of Katsina (1906–44).
- Sir Usman Nagogo – Emir of Katsina (1944–1981).
- Muhammadu Kabir Usman – Emir of Katsina (1981–2008).
- Abdullahi Bayero – Emir of Kano (1926–1953).
- Muhammadu Sanusi I – Emir of Kano (1954–1963).
- Ado Bayero – Emir of Kano (1963–2014).
- Sanusi Lamido Sanusi – Emir of Kano, former governor Central Bank of Nigeria.
- Sir Siddiq Abubakar III – former Sultan of Sokoto.
- Ibrahim Dasuki – former Sultan of Sokoto.
- Muhammadu Maccido – former Sultan of Sokoto.
- Zubeiru bi Adama - Last independent Lamido of Adamawa before British colonisation.
- Mohammed Jega - Emir of Gwandu.
- Ja'afaru Dan Isiyaku - Emir of Zazzau.
- Hameem Nuhu Sanusi - Emir of Dutse.
- Abubakar Shehu-Abubakar - Emir of Gombe.
- Ahmed Suleiman – Emir of Misau.
- Umaru Nagwamatse - First Sarkin Sudan, Founder of Kontogora Emirate.
- Modibbo Adama – Islamic Scholar and founder of the Adamawa Emirate.

=== Other ===
- Mamman Shata – Legendary Hausa-singer from Katsina State.
- Sunusi Ibrahim – Footballer
- Dadasare Abdullahi – Writer, Teacher and first female journalist from Northern Nigeria.
- Hajiya Ma'daki - Nigerian noblewoman and advisor in the royal courts of Katsina and Kano.
- Aisha Buhari – former First Lady of Nigeria.
- Maryam Uwais - Lawyer, Human Right Activist.
- Bello Bala Shagari – Documentary filmmaker, a Youth Activist & Leader and the Current president of The National Youth Council of Nigeria (NYCN), Nigeria.
- Yakubu Muhammed Hausa actor.

== Guinea ==
- Karamokho Alfa – Religious leader who led a jihad that led to the formation of Futa Jallon, Guinea
- Ibrahim Sori Mawdo (The Elder) – Religious leader and Second Almaami of Futa Jalon, Guinea
- Abdul Rahman Ibrahima Sori - was a Fulani prince and Amir, from Fouta Djallon, in modern-day Guinea, West Africa, who was captured and sold to European slave traders, causing him to be enslaved in Mississippi, U.S, for 40 years.
- Bokar Biro – last independent Almamy of Fuuta Jalon, Resistance hero to French invasion, Guinea
- Thierno Aliou – Author, Muslim theologian and politician, Guinea
- Yacine Diallo – Politician. former member of French National Assembly, Guinea
- Boubacar Diallo Telli – Diplomat and politician. First Secretary-General of the Organization of African Unity (OAU), UN Representative, Ambassador to USA, Minister of Justice, Guinea
- Binta Pilote - Guinea armed forces pilot, first black female helicopter pilot in Africa.
- Aminata Diallo (military) - Second Brigadier-General Guinea Armed forces.
- Amadou Oury Bah (In French) - Prime Minister Guinea
- Saifoulaye Diallo - former foreign minister, former president of the National Assembly.
- Aïcha Bah Diallo - former Guinean education minister and women's rights activist.
- Mariama Wax Sylla (in french) - Former World Bank Group Resident Representative for Namibia, former minister of Agriculture, Minister of the Economy, Finance and Budget, Guinea.
- Alpha Oumar Barry – Medical doctor and politician, former Minister of State for Exchange, Guinea
- Folly Bah Thibault - French Guinean journalist, and senior presenter for Al Jazeera English, Founder of Elle Ira à l’Ecole.
- Ousmane Baldé – Economist and politician. former governor of Guinean Fed reserve (Central bank), former minister of finance. Guinea
- M'Mahawa Sylla - First female general of the Guinean Armed Forces, Governor of Conakry.
- Khaité Sall (in French - Minister of Health, Guinea
- Kaba Rougui Barry - Minister of Pre-University, Technical, Vocational Education and Civic Education, Mayor of Matam, first female mayor in Guinea.
- Aissatou Baldé - former minister of youth and youth employment.
- Moustapha Mamy Diaby - former Minister of Mail, Telecommunications and the digital Economy, Guinea.
- Mamadou Boye Bah – Politician and economist, former president of Union for the New Republic and former president of Union of Democratic Forces of Guinea.
- Siradiou Diallo – Journalist and politician, former magazine Jeune Afrique Editor in chief, and former president of Union for Progress and Renewal (Guinea).
- Cellou Dalein Diallo – Economist and politician, former Minister and prime minister; Opposition Leader, Guinea
- Tierno Monénembo (real name Thierno Saidou Diallo) – novelist and biochemist, winner of the Prix Renaudot award in 2008 for his novel The King of Kahel, winner of Grand Prix de la Francophonie 2017. Guinea
- Djibril Tamsir Niane – Guinean historian, playwright and short story writer.
- Alpha Bacar Barry - Minister of Higher Education, Scientific Research and Innovation.
- Djalikatou Diallo- former vice-president Guinean Football Federation, former vice-president Nation Assembly, former Minister of National unity and Citizenship.
- Diaka Sidibé- former Minister of Higher Education, Scientific Research and Innovation, former Minister of Trade, Industry and Small and Medium-sized Enterprises.
- Kadiatou Émilie Diaby - former Minister of Public Works.
- Ibrahima Abé Sylla - Minister of Energy, Hydropower and Hydrocarbons, Guinea.
- Aïssatou Bobo Baldé - former vice president National Assembly.
- Barry Diawadou – Civil clerk and politician, former member of the French National Assembly and former Minister of Education. Guinea
- Mamoudou Nagnalen Barry - former minister of Agriculture.
- Sidibé Fatoumata Kaba (diplomat) - former minister of foreign affairs, former permanent Representative to the African union And The United Nations, former ambassador to Nigeria, Ethiopia. Ambassador to the united states, Guinea.
- Mama Kanny Diallo - Economist, former Minister of Planning and Economic Development, Guinea.
- Saifoulaye Diallo –Politician and lawmaker, former member of the French National Assembly, former president of the Territorial Assembly and President of the National Assembly; former Minister of State (foreign affairs, finance, social services).
- Elhadj Gando Barry - former Minister of Infrastructure and Public Works, CEO Électricité de Guinée.
- Ibrahima Barry (popularly known as Barry III) – Lawyer and politician, former Minister from Guinea
- Oumar Diouhé Bah - Minister of Health and public hygiene, Guinea.
- Fatoumata Binta Diallo - First woman who registered to practice law in the Bar of the Republic of Guinea Conakry.
- Bachir Diallo - Minister of Security and Civil Protection, Guinea.
- Facinet Sylla - Minister of Budget, former executive director Of International Monetary Fund.
- Katoucha (Kadiatou Niane) – former model and fashion designer, Guinea
- Boubacar Yacine Diallo – Journalist, Writer, former Minister of Communication, former chairman of the National Council of Communication, Current vice president of the independent national institution for human rights in Guinea.
- Addi Bâ or Bah Mamadou Hady – called by the Germans "black terrorist" ("Der schwarze Terrorist"), a figure of the French resistance, member of the first scrub of the Vosges, Guinea
- Aïcha Bah Diallo – former Minister of Education and Women's Rights Activist, former Senior education leader at UNESCO.
- Hamidou Diallo – American professional basketball player. 2019 NBA All-Star Slam Dunk Contest winner
- Abou Sangaré - Mechanic and Actor, Best European Actor 2024
- Rabiatou Sérah Diallo – Guinean trade unionist. former president of the National Transitional Council. Current president of Economic and Social Council, Guinea
- Black M (Alpha Diallo) – French rapper and Singer–Songwriter.
- General Souleymane Kelefa Diallo – former Guinean army chief of staff
- Mohamed Béavogui (Loma/Fulani) – Prime Minister of Guinea
- Mohamed Bayo – soccer player
- Pablo Thiam – soccer player
- Yadaly Diaby – soccer player
- Abdourahmane Barry
- Boubacar Barry – German football player
- Sadou Diallo
- Ibrahima Barry and Abdoulaye Barry – Creators of one of the only indigenous writing scripts in Africa, the Adlam script for the Fula language.

== Senegal and Mauritania ==
- El Hadj Umar Tall (1797–1864) – religious leader from the Tijani Sufi Order from Senegal. Founder of the Toucouleur Empire
- Ahmadou Tall (1836–1897) – Second Sultan of the Toucouleur Empire
- Sulayman Bal (1726–1776) – Islamic scholar and war commander from the Futa Toro in Senegal
- Macky Sall – former president of Senegal; Chairman of the African Union
- Abdoulaye Baldé (politician)- Politician, former secretary-general of the presidency, Mayor of Ziguinchor, Senegal
- Abdoulaye Saydou Sow - Former Minister of Urban Planning, Housing and Public Hygiene
- Abdou Rachid Thiam - Biophysicist, research director at French National Centre for Scientific Research.
- Abdourahmane Sow- Politician, former Minister and former vice-president of the National Assembly Senegal.
- Abou Lô - Former Minister of Communication, Telecommunications and ICT, Senegal.
- Abdoulaye Bibi Baldé - Former Minister of Communication, Telecommunications, Posts and Digital Ecosystem
- Ahmadou Bamba Ba – Religious leader, Senegal
- Amadou Kane - Former Minister of Economy and Finance, Senegal.
- Amadou-Mahtar M'Bow - Former director general of UNESCO, First African to Lead a Global Institution.
- Mame Madior Boye - First Female prime minister of Senegal.
- Aïssata Kane – former Mauritanian politician who was the country's first female government minister and women's rights activist.
- Amadou Ba- Politician. Current prime minister, former minister of foreign affairs, former Minister of Economy and Finance, Senegal
- Amadou Hott - Senegalese economist.
- Mamadou Amadou Ly - Educationist, first African to be awarded the Yidan Prize, Time Magazine 100 Most influential people in the world (2026), Senegal.
- Amsatou Sow Sidibé- academic, lawyer and politician, Senegal
- Adji Bousso Dieng - assistant Professor of artificial intelligence, First African Faculty school of Engineering and applied science, Princeton University, Senegal.
- Ayuba Suleiman Diallo - Fulani Muslim prince and merchant, from Bundu, who was captured and sold to European slave traders after having just sold slaves himself.
- Ba Mamadou Mbare – former president of the Senate of Mauritania and former acting president of Mauritania, in office 15 April 2009 – 5 August 2009. The first black leader of Mauritania
- Baaba Maal – Singer and guitarist – Senegal
- Babacar Ba - former minister of finance, Foreign minister of Senegal.
- Cheikh Tidiane Gadio - Diplomat, former Minister of State, Minister of Foreign Affairs, Senegal
- Cherif Mohamed Aly Aidara - Shi'i religious leader, NGO founder, and international development leader
- Cheikh Hamidou Kane Mathiara - former Minister of the Armed Forces, Senegal
- Daouda Sow (politician)- Politician and legislator, former Minister and former president of the National Assembly, Senegal
- Doudou Ka - Former Minister of Economy, Planning and Cooperation, Senegal.
- Doudou Thiam - First Foreign Minister, Senegal.
- Djibo Leyti Kâ – Held multiple ministerial positions Including Foreign Affairs, National Education, Interior, Communication etc. in Senegal
- Fatoumata Ka - first female mayor in Senegal, mayor of the commune of Diourbel.
- Habib Thiam - former president of the National assembly, former prime minister, Senegal.
- Habib Sy - former Minister of Agriculture, Senegal.
- Iba Der Thiam - Writer, Historian, former Minister of Education.
- Ibrahima Diallo (politician) – politician who served in the French Senate from 1956 to 1958
- Dior Fall Sow - Senegalese jurist and legal scholar, First female prosecutor in Senegal.
- Khalifa Sall - former mayor of Dakar.
- Khadidiatou Diallo- Activist, Senegal
- Mata Sy Diallo - former vice president of the National Assembly.
- Maba Diakhou Ba – Religious leader, Nioro Senegal
- Mamadou Dia – Member of French Senate from 1948 to 1956 and the French National Assembly from 1956 to 1958. First Prime Minister of Senegal (1957–62), Senegal
- Mamadou Moustapha Ba - former Minister of Economy and Finance.
- Moussa Balde - Former Minister of National Education, Higher Education, Research and Innovation (MENESRI), Senegal.
- Yérim Habib Sow - Ivorian-Senegalese Entrepreneur, Founder Teyliom Group.
- Omar Sy – French actor and comedian
- Ousmane Sow – sculptor, Senegal
- Oumar Khassimou Dia - Former Minister of planning and Foreign affairs, senegal.
- Elhadj As Sy - former secretary general of International Federation of Red Cross and Red Crescent Societies.
- Fodé Seck - Senegalese Diplomat, former president of the UN Security Council.
- General Mountaga Diallo- former Force Commander of MONUC, former diplomat, Senegal
- Safiatou Thiam - former Minister of Health.
- Samba Ndiobène Ka - Former Minister of Agriculture, Rural Equipment and Food Sovereignty.
- Seydina Oumar Sy - Minister of Foreign Affairs
- Thierno Alassane Sall - Former Minister of Energy, Infrastructure, Land Transport, Senegal.
- Fatma Samoura - Diplomat, First Female secretary General of FIFA.
- Aïssata Tall Sall- Minister of Foreign Affairs; Senegal
- Zahra Iyane Thiam - Former Minister of Microfinance and Social and Solidarity Economy, Senegal.
- Abdoulkader Thiam
- Abdallahi Mahmoud
- Abdoulaye Ba
- Adama Ba
- Ahmed Sidibé - Mauritanian Football Manager and former player
- Aly Abeid— Football player; Mauritania
- Houssen Abderrahmane
- Bilal Sidibé - Mauritanian football player
- Ibrahim Ba
- Issa Ba
- Issiar Dia
- Mohamed Dellahi Yali
- Moussa Sow- Football player
- Pape Habib Sow
- Aïssata Tall Sall - Minister of Foreign Affairs, Senegal
- Abdou Diallo - Senegalese professional footballer who plays for RB Leipzig.
- Kalidou Koulibaly - Senegalese professional footballer who plays for Al Hilal SFC.
- Bambo Diaby
- El Hadji Ba
- Lamine Ba
- Demba Ba
- El Mami Tetah
- Papa Malick Ba
- Mohamed Saqr
- Mouhamadou Dabo
- Mamadou Fall
- Idrissa Thiam
- Djeidi Gassama
- Ousseynou Ba

== Mali ==
- Adame Ba Konaré – historian, writer, and former First Lady of Mali (wife of president Alpha Oumar Konaré)
- Afel Bocoum - singer
- Bah Mamadou
- Cheick Oumar Dabo
- Demba Barry, footballer
- Lassana Diallo
- Sékou Amadou (1775–1846) – founder and First Shaykh of the Maasina Empire in 1817.
- Baréma Bocoum – politician and diplomat. former foreign minister of Mali and former member of French National Assembly. Mali.
- Boubacar Alpha Bah - Malian economist, former minister of Territorial Administration and Decentralization.
- Cissé Mariam Kaïdama Sidibé - former prime minister of Mali (1948–2021)
- Kaïta Kayentao Diallo - jurist, first female president of the Supreme court Of Mali.
- Mahmoud Dicko– Sunni imam, Mali
- Yoro Diakité- former prime minister, Mali.
- Amadou Hampâté Bâ – writer and ethnologist, Mali.
- Abdoulaye Sékou Sow – former prime minister, Mali.
- Moussa Léo Sidibé - former Minister of Agriculture, Husbandry and Fishery.
- Madina Ly-Tall – historian and diplomat, Mali.
- Mandé Sidibé - former prime minister.
- Malick Sidibé - Malian photographer.
- Oumar Tatam Ly – former prime minister, Mali.
- Oumou Sangaré - Malian singer.
- Inna Modja - singer
- Aïssata Cissé - First Female journalist, Mali
- Adama Ouane – former Minister, former Administrator of Organisation internationale de la Francophonie (OIF), Mali
- Alpha Oumar Konaré, former president of the republic (Fulani mother), Mali
- Diallo Lalla Sy - Former Minister of Employment and the Civil Service, Mali.
- N'Diaye Ramatoulaye Diallo - Former Minister of Handicrafts, Tourism and Culture, Mali.
- Bâ Fatoumata Nènè Sy - former Minister of the Economy, Industry and Trade, Mali.
- Sy Maïmouna Ba - Minister of Agriculture, Livestock and the Environment, Mali.
- Mountaga Tall – Politician. former Minister, former First Vice-president of the National Assembly of Mali
- Diallo Sène - Former Minister for the Promotion of Women, Children, and the Family, Mali.
- Issaka Sidibé - President of The High Court, former president of The National Assembly.
- Sy Oumou Louise Sidibé - Former Minister of Public Health, Social Action and the Advancement of Women, Mali
- Bâ Odette Yattara - Former minister of women and children Affairs, Mali.
- Amadou Baba Sy - former Minister Of Mines.
- Cheick Diallo – NBA Basketball player. former New Orleans Pelicans player, Current Phoenix Suns player. USA, Mali
- Baréma Bocoum - Former minister of foreign affairs, Mali.
- Soumaré Aminata Sidibé - Former Minister of State Lands anFd Land Affairs of Mali.
- Ba Hawa Keïta - Former minister of labor and Vocational training, Mali.
- Michel Sidibe - physician, former Minister of Health And Social Welfare, former executive director UNAIDS.
- Boubou Cisse - Politician and economist. former prime minister and Minister of Economy and Finance; former Minister of Industry and Mines; Mali.
- Diallo Madeleine Bâ - Former Minister Of Health, Mali.
- Fanta Sylla - First Female Minister of Justice, Mali.
- Samba Ousemane Sow - Physician, former Minister Of Health.
- Diarra Mariam Flantié Diallo - former Minister of Communication and New Technologies.
- Diallo Sène - former Minister for the Promotion of Women, Children, and the Family.
- Sidibé Aminata Diallo – Malian Academic and politician. former Minister of Basic Education, Literacy, and the National Languages. Mali
- Diarra Mariam Flantié Diallo - Minister of Communications And Technology, Mali.
- Souleymane Sidibé (politician) - former Minister of Internal Security and Civil Protection, Foreign Affairs.
- Ousmane Sy - Politician. former Minister of Territorial Administration and Local Communities; Mali.
- Sy Kadiatou Sow– Politician and Women's Rights Activist, former governor of Bamako district, the first woman to hold the position in Mali, former minister of foreign affairs, Foreign Malians and African Integration and former Minister of Urban Planning and Habitat. Mali
- Sangaré Niamoto Ba- Politician, former Ministry of Industry, Investment and Commerce
- Djibril Sidibé - Malian football player (Born 1982)
- Djibril Sidibé - French football player of Malian descent (Born 1992)
- Inna Modja - Singer, songwriter and activist
- Mamadou Sidibé - Malian musician
- Moussa Diaby
- Moctar Ouane- diplomat and politician. Prime minister; former minister of foreign affairs; former ambassador to the United Nations.

== Burkina Faso ==
- Thomas Sankara - Military officer, pan-African revolutionary, President of Burkina Faso.
- Hama Arba Diallo – Politician, diplomat and civil servant former minister of foreign affairs, former vice-president of the National Assembly, Burkina Faso
- Salif Diallo – former president of National Assembly; former Minister of Environment and Water, former Minister of Agriculture, Burkina Faso
- Yéro Boly – Administrator, Diplomat and Politician, former Minister of Territorial Administration and Security, former director of the Cabinet of the president and former minister of defense; Burkina Faso.
- Amadou Dicko - Minister of animal resources.
- Chérif Sy – journalist, politician, former president of the National Transitional Council of Burkina Faso, former acting president of Burkina Faso (17 September 2015 – 23 September 2015). Current minister of defense; Burkina Faso
- Alpha Barry – Journalist, current minister of foreign affairs; Burkina Faso
- Aminata Diallo Glez – Filmmaker, actress and producer, Burkina Faso
- Boubacar Diallo (filmmaker) – Journalist, Filmmaker, Burkina Faso
- Sékou Ba – Politician, former Minister of Animal Resources, Burkina Faso
- Dicko Fils - Singer

== Cameroon ==
- Modibbo Adama – Islamic scholar and first emir of Adamawa (Both Cameroon and Nigerian Adamawa)
- Ahmadou Ahidjo – first president, Cameroon (1960–1982)
- Bello Bouba Maigari – former prime minister, Cameroon
- Sadou Hayatou – former prime minister, Cameroon
- Issa Hayatou – former president of the Confederation of African Football (CAF), former acting president FIFA, Cameroon
- Oumarou Fadil – Businessman, Vice President of Group Fadil (an agro-industrial group which operates in several sectors including soap, oil extraction, tourism, livestock, and new information technologies), Cameroon
- Djaili Amadou Amal – Writer and feminist activist, Cameroon
- Goggo Addi – Storyteller who worked to preserve Fulani cultural heritage
- Souleymanou Hamidou
- Germaine Ahidjo - former first lady, Cameroon (1960–1982)
- Youssoufa Daoua (1947–2015), Cameroonian politician
- Mohamadou Bayero Fadil, Cameroonian businessman
- Abbo Aboubakar, Cameroonian businessman and politician
- Baba Ahmadou Danpullo, Cameroonian businessman
- Nana Bouba, Cameroonian businessman
- Marafa Hamidou Yaya, Cameroonian politician
- Garga Haman Adji, Cameroonian politician
- Mohamadou Dabo, Cameroonian businessman

== Sierra Leone ==
- Amadu Wurie - Educationist and politician, First Minister of Education and later Minister of Interior of Sierra Leone
- Sir Banja Tejan-Sie - Politician and lawyer. former vice president under SLPP (1953–1956), former chief justice and Governor-General of Sierra Leone
- Mohamed Juldeh Jalloh – Current vice president, Republic of Sierra Leone
- Abass Bundu – Current Speaker of Parliament Sierra Leone, former minister of foreign affairs, former Executive Secretary of the Economic Community of West African States
- Ibrahim Bundu - former majority leader of the Sierra Leone Parliament, Sierra Leone
- Abdulai Hamid Charm - former chief justice, Sierra Leone
- Umu Hawa Tejan-Jalloh – former chief justice, Diplomat, Sierra Leone
- Miatta Maria Samba - Sierra Leonian jurist and current judge at the International Criminal Court (ICC).
- Sulaiman Tejan-Jalloh – politician and Diplomat, former Minister of Transport and Communications and former ambassador to US, Sierra Leone
- Neneh Cherry (birth name Neneh Mariann Karlsson) – Singer-songwriter, rapper, occasional DJ and broadcaster, Sweden
- Titiyo (birth name Titiyo Yambalu Felicia Jah) – singer and songwriter, Sweden
- Alpha Timbo – Politician, educationist, lecturer and trade unionist. Minister of Primary and Secondary Education, former Minister of Labor and Industrialization, Sierra Leone
- Chernor Bah - Minister of Information and Civic Education
- Chernor Maju Bah – lawyer and politician. Leader of Majority party/Opposition Leader in parliament, former Running Mate for APC, former Deputy Speaker of Parliament of Sierra Leone; former chairman of the Mines and Minerals Resources Committee. Sierra Leone.
- Alhaji Lamrana Bah – Businessman, Sierra Leone
- Abubakarr Jalloh – Politician, former Minister of Mineral Resource, Sierra Leone
- Amadu Jalloh – Politician, Sierra Leone
- Minkailu Bah – politician and Lecturer, former Minister of Education, Youth and Sports, Sierra Leone
- Mariama Jalloh Singer–Songwriter, Sierra Leone, Germany
- Mohamed Bailor Barrie was a prominent businessman in Sierra Leone's diamond trade in the 70s and 80s
- Hardy Caprio- Real name Hardy Tayyib-Bah, a British singer, songwriter and record producer
- Fankaty Dabo
- Idris Kanu, Footballer
- Mohamed Kanu
- Mahmadu Alphajor Bah
- Yayah Jalloh

== Gambia ==
- Adama Barrow – Politician and real estate developer. Current president, Republic of the Gambia
- Assan Musa Camara - Former vice president, former minister of education, finance, External affairs, Gambia.
- Isatou Njie-Saidy – Politician. former vice president, former secretary of state Social Welfare, Health and Women's Affair, Republic of the Gambia
- Fatoumata Tambajang – Politician and Activist. former vice president, former Minister of Women's Affair, Republic of the Gambia
- Hassan Bubacar Jallow – Judge. Chief Justice of the Gambia since February 2017, former Prosecutor of the International Criminal Tribunal for Rwanda (ICTR), former Prosecutor of the Mechanism for International Criminal Tribunals, former justice of the Supreme Court of the Gambia, former Minister of Justice-Attorney General of the Gambia and former solicitor general of the Gambia.
- Muhammad B. S. Jallow – Vice President of the Gambia
- Dawda A. Jallow (In German) - Attorney general and Minister of Justice.
- Awa Bah (in German) - Jurist, First Female president of the Gambian Court of Appeal, Supreme court judge.
- Naceesay Salla-Wadda - Jurist, Second female president of the Gambian court of Appeal.
- Fatou Baldeh - Gambian women's rights activist,
- Abdoulie Cham- former Minister of Information and Communication Infrastructure.
- Ousman Sowe (in German) - Former DG State Intelligence Service.
- Abdoulie Jobe (politician)(in German) - Former Minister Of Energy and Petroleum.
- Ebrahim M. Samba(in German) - Gambian Physician, former president Of Gambia Football Federation, former World Health Organization WHO Regional Director For Africa.
- Bai Lamin Jobe(in German - Former Minister Of Works, Transportation And infrastructure.
- Samba D. Bah (in German) - Former DG State intelligence Service.
- Ousman A. Bah(in German) - Former Minister Of Communication and Technology.
- Mary Sey - Jurist, former justice of The Supreme court Of Gambia.
- Fatou Mass Jobe-Njie - former Minister of Tourism and Culture.
- Pa Jallow (Diplomat)(in German) - Former DG State intelligence service.
- Cherno Jallow – Lawyer and Judge. Justice of the Supreme Court of the Gambia, former attorney general of the British Virgin Islands, Gambia
- Hamat Bah – Politician. Current Minister of Tourism and Culture; leader of the National Reconciliation Party (NRP), Gambia
- Omar A. Jallow – Politician. former Minister of Agriculture, leader of the People's Progressive Party, Gambia
- Halifa Sallah – former Special Advisor to the president on Governance and the spokesperson for President Adama Barrow's administration, former National Assembly Minority Leader, Secretary-general of the People's Democratic Organisation for Independence and Socialism, Gambia
- Momodou Lamin Sedat Jobe - Diplomat, former Gambian foreign minister
- Mama Kandeh- leader opposition Gambia Democratic Congress, and former parliamentarian
- Bubacarr Bah - Professor of Mathematics, German Research Chair of Mathematics with specialization in Data Science at AIMS South Africa.
- Haddy Jallow- actress, Gambia.
- Buba Baldeh- former Minister for Youth Sports and Culture Under the PPP Regime. He is the son of the Late Micheal Baldeh who was a member of Parliament in the first Republic.
- Dawda Bah
- Samuel Kargbo- Football player
- Musa Barrow- Football player
- Musa Juwara
- Hamza Barry
- Muhammed Badamosi
- Seedy Bah

== Guinea Bissau ==
- Manuel Serifo Nhamadjo – former interim president and former acting president of the National People's Assembly
- Brigadier-General Umaro Sissoco Embaló – President of Guinea-Bissau, former prime minister and Minister of African Affairs.
- Adiato Djaló Nandigna – Current Minister of Fisheries; former acting prime minister, former minister of culture, Youth and Sports and former minister of defense, Guinea Bissau
- Baciro Djá – former prime minister, former Minister of National Defense and former Minister of Youth and Sport, Guinea Bissau
- Eloïne Barry – communications professional and founder of African Media Agency. France, Guinea Bissau
- Fatumata Djau Baldé – Current Minister of Public Administration and State Modernization; former minister of foreign affairs, Guinea Bissau
- Mamadu Saliu Djaló Pires - Former foreign minister of Foreign Affairs.
- Mamadú Iaia Djaló – Current Minister of Trade and Industry, Guinea Bissau
- Tiago Djaló
- Yannick Djaló
- Alejandro Balde
- Mama Baldé
- Manuel Baldé

== Niger, Chad, Benin, CAR ==
- Amadou Boubacar Cissé – politician, former prime minister, former Minister of State for Planning, Regional Development, and Community Development, Niger
- Mamadou Tandja (Fula/Soninke)- former president, Niger
- Hama Amadou – politician, former prime minister and president of the National Assembly of Niger
- Amadou Cheiffou – politician, former prime minister of Niger
- Albadé Abouba – politician, former acting prime minister, Current Minister of State, Minister of Agriculture and Livestock. Niger
- Bibata Niandou Barry - former Minister of women Affairs.
- Salifou Modi - former chief of staff, Nigerien Army, Vice President of the National Council for the Safeguard of the Homeland (Military Junta).
- Aissa Diori - former first lady, Niger
- Amina Bazindre - former ambassador to romania, Hungary, Germany and Russia.
- Fatou Djibo - author, first Nigerian woman to drive a car.
- Bouli Ali Diallo - academic, activist.
- Abdou Abarry - Nigerian diplomat, former president united nations security council, special representative for Central Africa and Head of the United Nations Regional Office for Central Africa.
- Ide Oumarou - diplomat, government minister, and journalist, former secretary-general of the Organization of African Unity
- Abdel Kader Baba-Laddé (or General Baba Laddé or Mahamat Abdoul Kadre) – politician, Chad.
- Aïchatou Boulama Kané - first female governor of Niamey, former minister of foreign affairs.
- Mamadou Diallo Sory - Former minister of Justice
- Maman Sambo Sidikou - former Ambassador Nigerien to the United States, United Nations secretary-general's special representative for the Democratic Republic of the Congo and head of the U.N. peacekeeping mission there, MONUSCO, high representative of the African Union for Mali and the Sahel.
- Abdoulaye Diori Kadidiatou Ly - jurist, former president of the Constitutional Court of Niger.
- Abdou Sidikou - former minister of foreign affairs, Niger.
- Yaou Sangaré Bakary - former ambassador to China, Minister of Foreign Affairs.
- Bouli Ali Diallo - academic and activist, Niger.
- Achta Djibrine Sy former Minister of Commerce and Industry, Chad.
- Banata Tchale Sow - economist, former chief of staff, Chad.
- Hindou Oumarou Ibrahim- environmental activist and geographer. Coordinator Association of Peul Women and Autochthonous People of Chad (AFPAT) and Co-director Pavilion of World Indigenous People, Chad
- Mariam Boni Diallo - first female foreign minister, Benin Republic.
- Ali Darassa – leader of the Central African rebel group, the Union for Peace in the Central African Republic (UPC) a self-defense force.
- Al-Amin Abu-Manga, linguist and professor at the University of Khartoum
- Ali Mohamed
- Issah Salou
- Jules Hamidou
- Habib Habibou
- Hassan Diallo

== Ghana, Togo, Ivory Coast and Tanzania ==
- Mohamed Ibn Chambas - lawyer, diplomat, politician and academic. Special Representative of the secretary-general and head of the United Nations Office for West Africa (UNOWA); First Executive Secretary of ECOWAS, former Deputy Foreign Secretary and Deputy Minister of Education, Ghana
- Tidjane Thiam - Former CEO of Prudential and Credit suisse, First African CEO of a Fortune Global 500 company, former Minister Of planning and National Development, Member Olympics committee, Côte d'Ivoire.
- Cheick Ousmane Diakité - Imam, president of the Higher Council of Imams, Mosques and Islamic Affairs of Côte d'Ivoire (Cosim).
- Ahmed Ramadan - politician and former chairman of People's National Convention (PNC). Father of Second Lady of Ghana
- Iddrisu Baba
- Said Sinare - former member of parliament, former ambassador to Egypt and Saudi Arabia, Ghana.
- Samira Bawumia - Politician, Second Lady of Ghana
- Mohammed Adamu Ramadan - Politician and member of the NDC, Ghana.
- Barry Moussa Barqué - Politician held multiple ministerial positions, including: Mines, Energy, Foreign Affairs, Finance Etc., Special Adviser to the president with the rank of Minister, current president of the National Assembly Togo.
- Ramata Ly-Bakayoko - Professor of pediatric dentistry, First female president of the University Félix-Houphouët-Boigny, former Minister of Higher Education and Scientific Research, Minister of Women, Families and Children, Ivory Coast.
- Aboudramane Sangaré - former minister of foreign affairs, Ivory Coast.
- Yacine Idriss Diallo|(in French) - president Of the Ivorian Football Federation, Ivory Coast.
- Khady Diallo - cultural engineer. former Ivorian cultural attache in Paris. General Secretary of the National Commission of the Francophonie in Côte d'Ivoire, Ivory Coast
- Boubacar Barry - retired Ivorian football goalkeeper. Goalkeeping coach at Oud-Heverlee Leuven- Belgium. Ivory Coast
- Anthony Diallo – politician, former Minister of National Resources and Tourism, former member of the Tanzanian Parliament, Tanzania
- Amad - professional Footballer, plays for Manchester United; Ivory Coast
- Liban Abdulahi
- Nazr Mohammed, Basketball player
- Abou Diaby
- Abdoul-Halimou Sama
- Mohammed Diomande
- Abdul Razak
- Georges Ba
- Ismaël Diallo
- Moustapha Salifou

== Liberia ==
- Rugie Barry, politician
- Asatu Bah Kenneth - Liberian activist, civil War Hero, former Deputy Inspector of Police.

== Canada, United States of America, Europe ==
- Abdul Rahman Ibrahima Sori (c. 1762 – 1829) – Son of Ibrahim Sori Mawdo of Futa-Jallon. Enslaved in Natchez, Mississippi but freed and repatriated to Liberia.
- Alhaji Mohammed
- Ayuba Suleiman Diallo (also known as Job ben Solomon) – Trader, then slave. Freed and repatriated to his homeland in Boundou, Senegal
- Bill Hamid
- Diaryatou Bah - French female activist.
- Moussa Diallo Elhadj - Senator, Belgian Senate.
- Philippe Diallo - President of French Football Federation
- Nafissatou Thiam - Three time heptathlon Olympic Gold Medalist, Hepthathlon World Record Holder.
- Satou Sabally - German-American Female Basketballer, Three time WNBA All star, WNBA Most Improved Player (2023), All-WNBA First Team (2023).
- Nyara Sabally - German Female Basketballer, WNBA champion 2024.
- Abou Diaby - former Arsenal and French National team Player.
- Romane Dicko - Two time single judo olympics bronze medalist, two time mixed olympics Gold medalist.
- Ousmane Dembélé - french national team player, Ballon D'or 2025
- Elladj Baldé - Canadian figure skater. He won the 2015 Nebelhorn Trophy, an ISU Challenger Series event. He is the 2008 Canadian Junior champion.
- Boris Diaw - French basketball player
- Alexander Bah - Danish football player
- Djibril Sidibé (footballer, born 1992) - French World cup winner.
- Fodé Sylla - former member of the European parliament, former president of SOS Racisme
- Hamidou Diallo- American professional basketball player for the Oklahoma City Thunder of the National Basketball Association (NBA)
- Ira Frederick Aldridge – stage actor, claims to have descended from the Fulani princely line, USA
- Omar Ibn Said (c. 1770 – 1864) – Islamic scholar from Futa-Toro. Taken as a slave to Charleston, South Carolina in 1807. Escaped to North Carolina, Wrote a slave narrative in Arabic professing his Islamic faith. Died before end of Civil War.
- Richard Pierpoint - Slave, freed slave, British Army soldier and farmer in Fergus, Ontario Canada.
- Yarrow Mamout (or Mahmoud or Mamood or Muhammad Yaro) – was a former slave, entrepreneur, and property owner in Georgetown, Washington, DC, USA
