= Khady =

Khady is a female given name common in Senegal. Notable people with the name include:

- Khady Diallo (born 1955), Ivory Coast Francophile and cultural engineer
- Khady Dieng or Ndeye Dieng (born 1994), Senegalese basketball player
- Khady Diop (also spelt Khadidiatou) (born 1971), Senegalese basketball player
- Khady Hane (born 1962), Senegalese author
- Khady Koita (born 1959), Senegalese activist against violence towards women and FGM
- Khady Yacine Ngom (born 1979), Senegalese basketball player
- Khady Sall (born 1987), Senegalese footballer
- Khady Seck (born 2000), Senegalese handball player
- Khady Sylla (1963–2013), Senegalese writer and filmmaker
