= Kadidiatou =

Kadidiatou or Khadidiatou is a feminine given name. Notable people with this name include:

- Abdoulaye Diori Kadidiatou Ly (born 1952) president of the Constitutional Court of Niger
- Kadidiatou Diani (born 1995), French footballer
- Khadidiatou Diallo, Senegalese advocate
- Khadidiatou Dieng (born 1992), Senegalese swimmer
