= Haïdar el Ali =

Senegalese ecologist

Haïdar El Ali
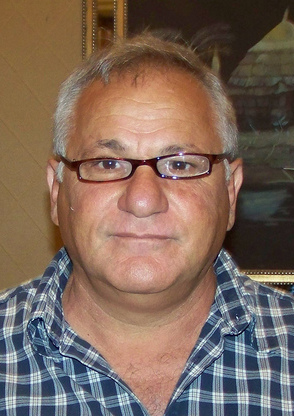
- (2008)

Minister of Fisheries of Senegal
- Incumbent
- Assumed office 2 September 2013

Ecology Minister of Senegal
- In office 5 April 2012 – 2 September 2013

Personal details
- Born: 1953 (age 72–73) Senegal

Haidar el Ali, Senegalese ecologist, was born in 1953 in Louga, Senegal. His parents were Lebanese immigrants who “got stuck” in Senegal on the route to the United States in the 1930s. After settling in Senegal, the family started multiple furniture stores and workshops in Medina neighborhoods in Dakar. While growing up Ali worked in the family business. However at the age of 25, he had a turning point as he became interested in nature causing him to leave his family business. Once he left the family business, Ali went to France to become a professional scuba diving instructor. Once he returned to Senegal, he started a diving company in Dakar. He would film what he saw underwater and share those images with local communities and the media which helped raise awareness about humans impact on the marine ecosystem.

In 1984, he became the director of Oceanium, an environmental nongovernmental organization based in Dakar. During his leadership, Oceanium focused on community based conversation, reforestation, and sustainable fishing. As the mangroves were disappearing in Senegal between the 1980 and 2005, he organized replanting efforts with hundreds of villages in Casamance. Over the past decade, his effort has led to planting of 152 million mangroves which is the largest reforestation project of its kind in the world. Beyond his role as a President of Oceanium, he served as Senegal's Minister of Education and Minister of Fishering from 2012 to 2014. He is also the head of Senegal's Green party (FEDES).
