= Ministry of Justice (Kaduna State) =

Ministry of Kaduna State

Agency overview
- Jurisdiction: Kaduna State
- Headquarters: Kaduna, Nigeria
- Minister responsible: Aisha Dikko, Attorney General and Commissioner for Justice
- Agency executive: Permanent Secretary
- Parent department: Kaduna State Government
- Website: justice.kdsg.gov.ng

Ministry of Justice is the state government ministry of Kaduna State, it is concerned with judicial and prosecutorial activities within the state. The Ministry of Justice control the courts system and the prosecuting offices. Aisha Dikko is the Attorney General.

== Responsibilities ==
The Ministry of Justice has the responsibilities on legislative initiatives and their presentation of Knesset and its committees., the ministry works with security department to make sure law and order is maintained to also controls administration of justice in the state.
