= Abbo Aboubakar =

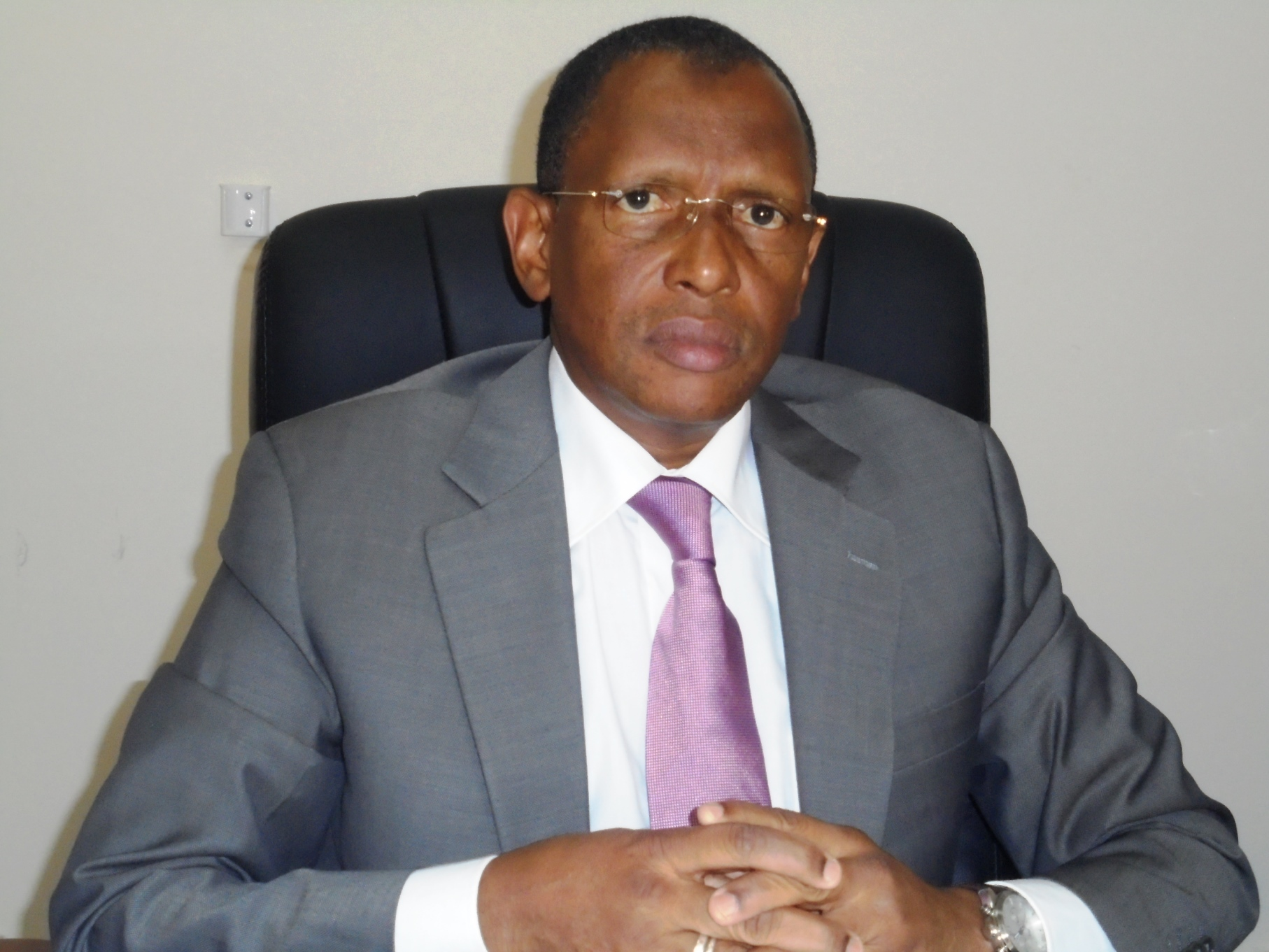
- Camrail's Board of Directors is headed by Abbo Aboubakar, its President

Mayor
- Incumbent
- Assumed office 9 February 2020

Chairman of the Board of Directors of the railway transport company Cameroon Railways Corporation
- Incumbent
- Assumed office 9 June 2017

Personal details
- Born: 1960 (age 65–66) Belel, Cameroon
- Party: CPDM

Abbo Aboubakar (born 1960) is a Cameroonian politician, and public administrator. He is known for his roles in local government and public administration, He has served as mayor of the commune of Belel, located in the Vina department of the Adamawa region of Cameroon, since 2013.

== Early life and education ==
Abbo Aboubakar was born in Belel, Vina department, Adamawa region, Cameroon. He graduated from the National School of Administration and Magistracy (ENAM) in Cameroon, where he received training to prepare for senior administrative and magistrate roles. He also pursued further studies in France, at the national institute of the public administration (IAP) in Paris, focusing on public expenditure control (“Master in the control of public spending”). According to some reports, he was working on a PhD thesis at the University of Yaoundé II (Soa), on the topic of decentralization law.

== Career ==
Before entering elected office, Abbo Aboubakar held various positions in the Cameroonian government administration. Early in his career, he worked as a cadre at the Ministry of Livestock, Fisheries, and Animal Industries.

He later joined the services of the Prime Minister as an subordinate, where he was responsible for studies and served in a supervisory capacity from 2003. His administrative experience extended to managing budgetary affairs and serving on commissions related to public contracts and health programs funded by the Global Fund against AIDS, Tuberculosis, and Malaria.

Since June 9, 2017, Abbo Aboubakar has been the Chairman of the Board of Directors of the transport Cameroon Railways Company (Camrail).

== Political career ==
Abbo Aboubakar was elected mayor of Belel, in the 2013 municipal elections. His political affiliation is with the ruling party, the Cameroon People's Democratic Movement (CPDM). In 2013, he also served as president of the municipal election campaign commission for RDPC in Belel and was later appointed president of the regional chapter of the Communes and United Cities of Cameroon (CVUC) for the Adamawa region.

== Awards ==
On March 2, 2022, Aboubakar Abbo was awarded the "Best Reportage Award of the International Technical and Style Writing Competition Africa Zone," an outcome fueled by his talent for crafting and a captivating narrative tone.
