= Oumarou Fadil =

Cameroonian businessman

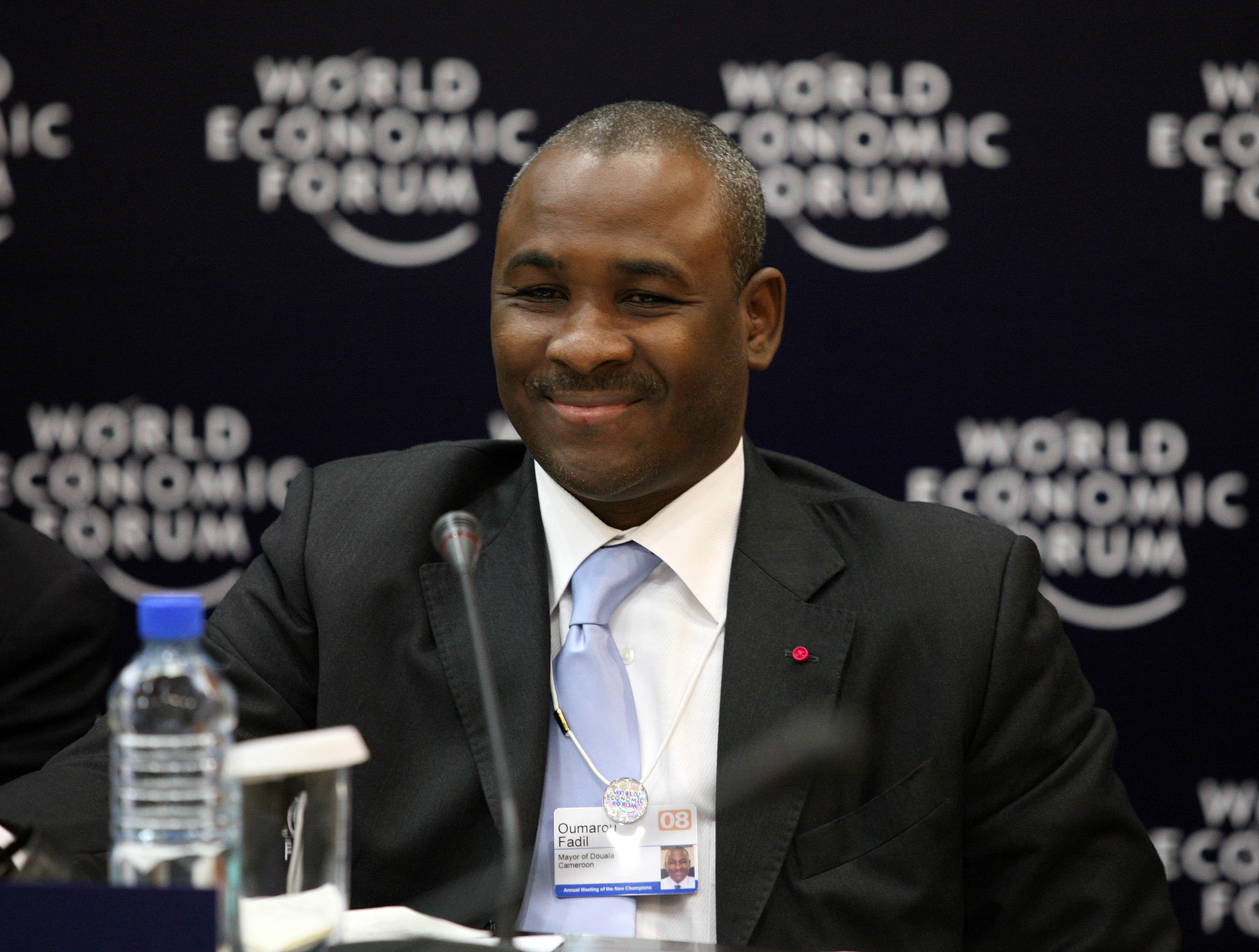
- Born: April 4, 1966 (age 60); Garoua, Cameroun
- Education: University of San Diego
- Occupation: Vice President of Group Fadil
- Spouse: Hassanatou Mamadou (m. 1998)

Oumarou Fadil was born on 4 April 1966 in Garoua, the capital of the North Province of Cameroon. As a businessman, he is the vice president of Group Fadil, an agro-industrial group prominent within Central Africa, which operates in several sectors including soap, oil extraction, tourism, livestock, and new information technologies. The company was founded by M. Fadil's father in 1944.

== Family and background ==
M. Fadil's biological parents are both from the North Region of Cameroon, the birthplace of Cameroon's first President Ahmadou Ahidjo. His father, El Hadj Fadil Abdoulaye Hassoumi (1924–1993), and mother, Adja Ahoua Doudou are members of the Fulani (Fulbe), a dynamic tribe whose main economic activities are based on livestock and trade. Their names are El Hadj Fadil Abdoulaye Hassoumi (father) and Hadja Hawa Doudou (mother). They are from Rabinga and Garoua respectively and are both members of the Fulbe ethnic group, a dynamic tribe whose main economic activities are based on livestock farming and trade.

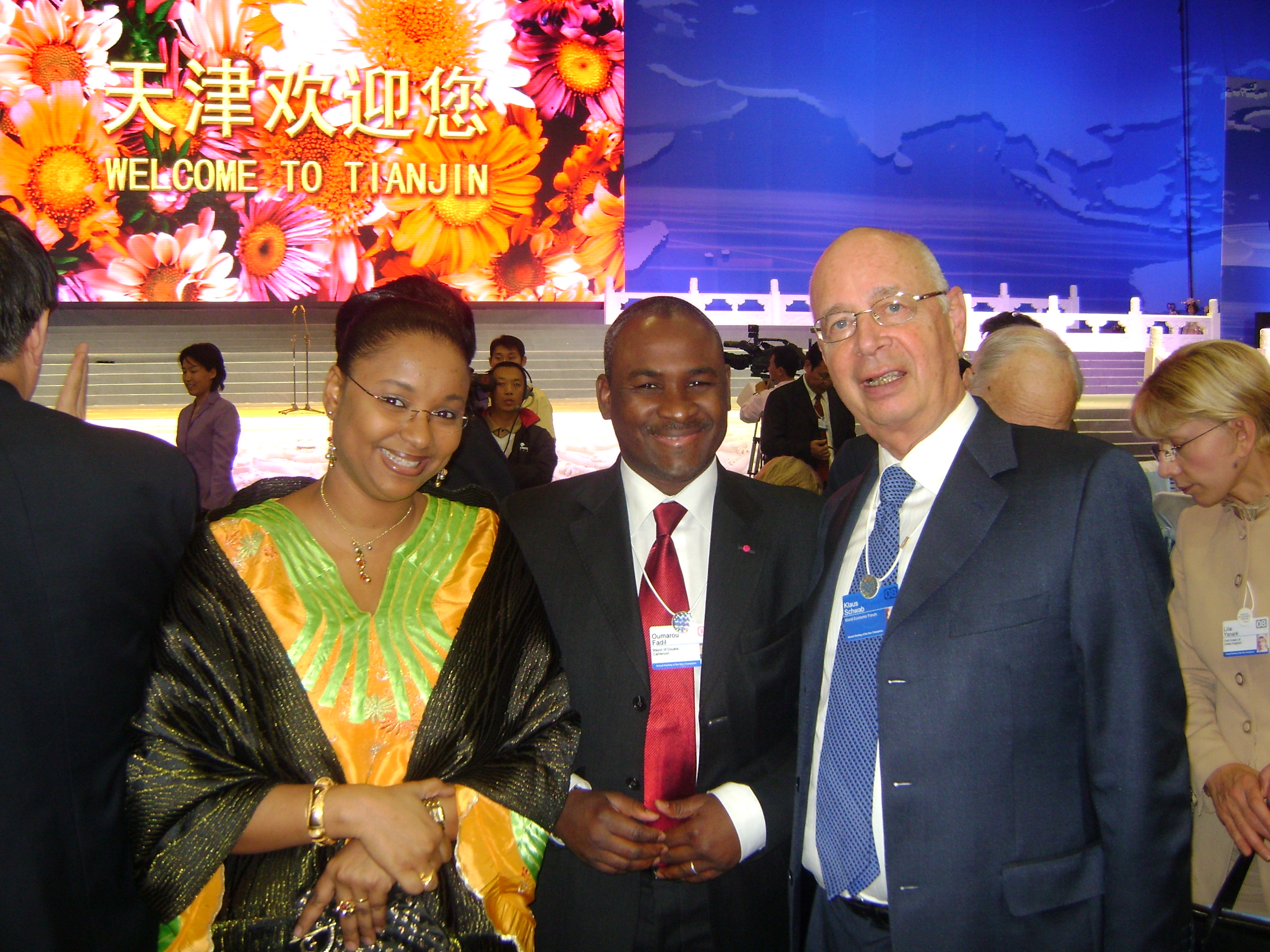
Oumarou FADIL and his spouse Hassanatou MAMADOU, with the president of the World Economic Forum Klaus Schwab

Oumarou Fadil married to Hassanatou in 1998. She comes from one of the greatest and noblest families in Garoua. The eldest of their three children is Balkissou Dya. Followed by her twin siblings Hassan and Houssenatou.

Hassanatou Mamadou, the wife, holds an MBA in Business Administration from the University of Poitiers. She takes an active part in her husband’s professional life.

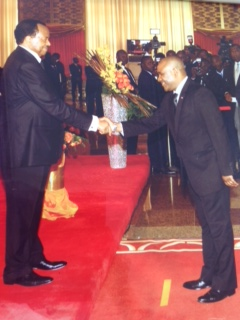
Oumarou Fadil et le Son Excellence le Président du Cameroun Paul Biya

Mr. Oumarou Fadil is the brother of Senator Mohamadou Bayero Fadil, businessman and president of the Fadil Group.

== Academic profile ==
Oumarou Fadil went to the University of San Diego where he got a master's degree in International Business. Two ways then opened to him: whether he would become a trader at Wall Street or come back to Cameroon. He chose the latter and joined the Fadil Group. He first occupied the post of Administrative and financial Manager at the Complexe Chimique Camerounais a Central Africa sub-regional, a pioneer in agro-industry, and later the post of General Manager of Complexe Chimique Camerounais. As the Vice president of the Fadil Group he has taken an active part in the development of the said Group.

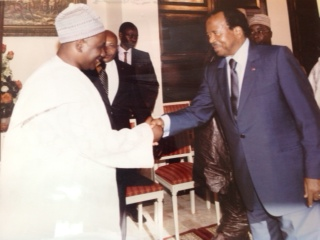
Son Excellence le Président du Cameroun Paul Biya et Oumarou Fadil

He quickly left his own imprint into the company leading it towards citizenship and societal responsibility. These productive initiatives make Complexe Chimique Camerounais a giant in the field of soap production.

== Political activities ==
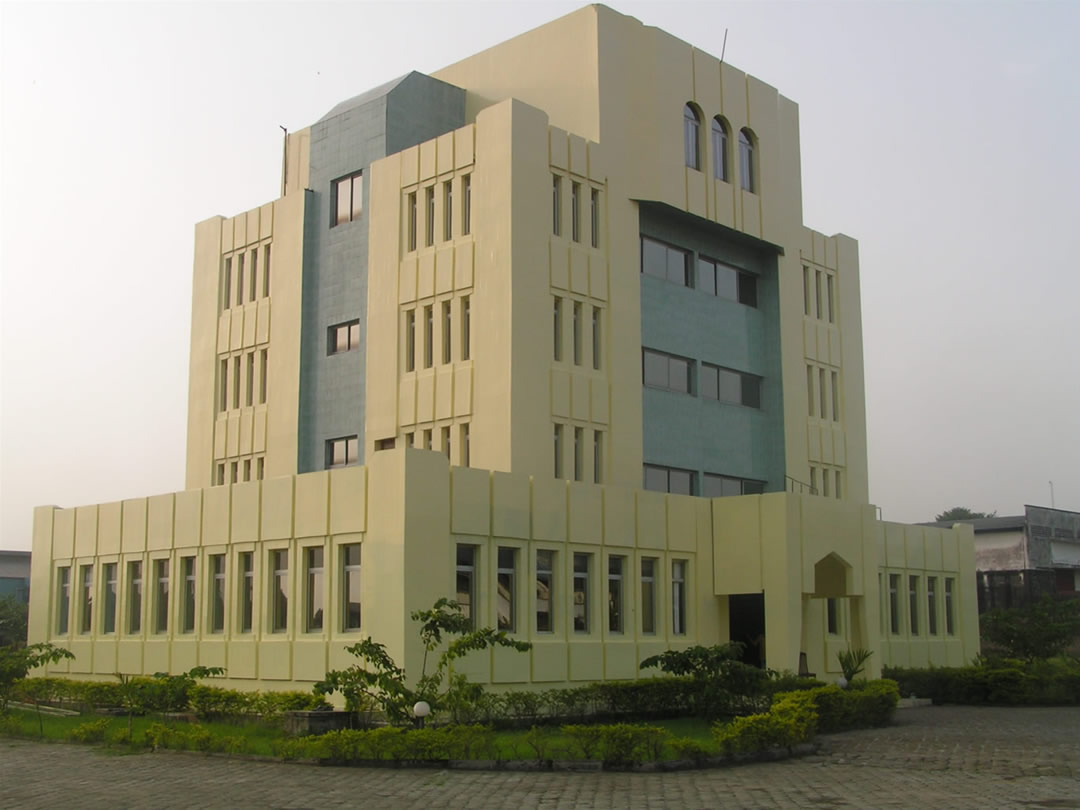
Siege groupe fadil2

Oumarou Fadil became Mayor of the Douala III constituency in 2002, being then the youngest Cameroonian mayor ever elected. This victory was greatly mentored by Pokossy Doumbe who allowed him to join the CPDM list in 1996.

As the mayor of Douala III, Oumarou Fadil took part in many summits worldwide, notably in the World Economic Forum summit in 2008 and in the India-Africa summit in 2012.

Oumarou Fadil also took an active part in the re –naming of one of the major streets in Douala. The street was renamed "Avenue El Hadj Fadil Abdoulaye (El Hadj Fadil Abdoulaye Avenue), reflects his father’s name, the founder of the Fadil Group.

== Achievements ==
Thanks to a partnership with a group of American schools (Montgomery County Public Schools) the Douala III Constituency received six hundred desktop computers that were awarded to schools in the Douala III area.

Through the same channel the Douala III council hall was equipped with a Multimedia Resources Centre in 2003 where more than ten thousand young men and women have been trained so far. The centre was opened by Louis Bapes Bapes and Haman Adama, ministers of Secondary Education and of Basic Education respectively in the presence of his Excellency Niels Marquardt, US Ambassador to Cameroon at the time.

In the field of health Mr. Oumarou Fadil has made major gifts of beds, drugs and various devices to the Bonadiwoto Health Centre. Most of the gifts aim at preventing and curing diseases such as malaria, typhoid Fever and HIV-AIDS.

He is recently appointed as a member of the standing committee of African Cup of Nations organization in FUTSAL and Beach Soccer.

== Honors ==
Knight in the National Order of Valor Officer of the National Order of Valor Commander of the National Order of Valor
