= Salifou Fatimata Bazeye =

Nigerien jurist and former magistrate

President of the Constitutional Court of Niger
- In office 2007–2009

Salifou Fatimata Bazèye, also known as Fatoumata Bazèye and Fatoumata Bazaî, is a Nigerien jurist, former magistrate, head of the Supreme Court of Niger and from 2007 to 2009 President of the Constitutional Court of Niger. Her court's rulings on the constitutional revisions planned by then President of Niger Mamadou Tandja, led to her extra-constitutional dismissal and a heightening of the 2009–2010 Nigerien constitutional crisis. Following the 2010 Nigerien coup d'état, she was named head of the transitional Constitutional Court of Niger.

== Background ==
Born in 1951 in Dosso, Bazaye received her legal training in France at the Ecole Nationale de la Magistrature de Paris. Bazeye is married to a government official and a mother of several children. She returned to Niger as a Magistrate, and came to political prominence in 2005 when, as a member of the Supreme Court, she refused a government motion to transfer Magistrates who were on strike. Despite this, she was nominated for one of the seats on the constitutional court reserved for jurists in 2007, and accepted by the government. She was then elected President of the court by its members.

== 2009 Constitutional crisis ==
In 2009, she led the court in two unanimous decisions opposing President of Niger Mamadou Tandja's move to hold a referendum to retire the Constitution of Niger and remain in office while a new constitution was drafted. The first (non binding) decision, presented on 26 May 2009, triggered the President's dismissal of the National Assembly while a further binding decision was delivered on 12 June. President Tandja subsequently carried out his plans for a new constitution and dismissed the Constitutional Court. In February 2010 he was overthrown by military coup, with power handed back to a civilian government in 2011.

== Seventh Republic ==
Following the 2010 Nigerien coup d'état and the fall of Mamadou Tandja, Ms. Bazèye was named by the transitional Supreme Council for the Restoration of Democracy (CSRD) to head the 11 member Constitutional Council, a consultative High Court during the transition to the Nigerien Seventh Republic.

In December 2011 the Nigerian newspaper publishers of the Daily Trust awarded Ms. Bazèye its 4th annual "African of the Year" award for her "track record as an incorruptible judicial officer."
