= Soa, Cameroon =

Soa
- Commune and town
- Location in Cameroon
- Coordinates: 3°59′N 11°36′E
- Country: Cameroon
- Region: Centre Region
- Time zone: UTC+1 (WAT)

Soa is a town and commune in Cameroon.

== See also ==
- Communes of Cameroon
