= Moussa Léo Sidibé =

Malian politician

Moussa Léo Sidibé (born 1949) is the minister of agriculture, animal husbandry and fishing of Mali, serving since 24 April 2012.
