= Naceesay Salla-Wadda =

Gambian lawyer and judge

- Born: 27 October 1971 (age 54); Banjul, Gambia
- Education: Gambia High School
- Alma mater: London Metropolitan University; Anglia Polytechnic University
- Occupation: lawyer
- Awards: Order of the Republic of The Gambia

Naceesay Salla-Wadda also spelt either as Na Ceesay Salla Wadda or Naceesay Sallah-Wadda (born 27 October 1971) is a Gambian lawyer and legal expert.

== Biography ==
Her father Muhammadou Demba Salla was a school teacher and former principal of Armitage High School in Janjanbureh. Naceesay was the youngest child of thirteen children in her family and had six old sisters and six old brothers.

== Career ==
She attended the Gambia High School (now called as the Gambia Senior Secondary School) and completed her primary and secondary education at the school in 1992. She pursued her higher education in the field of law at the Anglia Polytechnic University and obtained her Bachelor's of Law degree in 1997. She also moved to Sierra Leone and studied at the Sierra Leone Law School. She returned to the Gambia and was called to the Gambian Bar on 22 December 1999. She was awarded the certificate of practice as a barrister and solicitor of the superior courts of The Gambia.

She obtained a Master of Law degree in Human Rights Law from the London Metropolitan University in September 2007. She completed the degree after obtaining Chevening Scholarship from the British Council through Department for International Development in order to pursue one year's Master of Law degree program.

Naceesay served as a legal clerk at the Attorney General's Chambers, Ministry of Justice from December 1992 to December 1994. She also served as a public prosecutor for a brief stint at the Criminal division of the Attorney General's Chambers and Department of State for Justice from November 1997 to September 1998. She served at the Gambia Ministry of Justice from 1992 to 2006.

She served as a state counsel at the Attorney General's Chambers and Department of State for Justice from December 1999 to 2001. She was then promoted to senior state counsel in January 2002. In July 2002, she was appointed as the acting curator of interstate estates and served for a brief stint lasting three months. She was later promoted as principal state counsel in January 2004 and served in the position until April 2005. She was also appointed as the acting solicitor general and legal secretary at the Attorney General's Chambers and Department of State for Justice from December 2005 to September 2006.

Salah served in the Gambian judiciary initially as a judge in the high court and later went onto serve as justice at the Court of Appeal. She became a judge at the Gambian High Court in October 2007 and served in the position until December 2010. She was sacked from the high court in 2008 but was reinstated to the position of high court judge in the same year. She was appointed as a judge in the Court of Appeal in January 2011 and served in the position until August 2016.

On 24 August 2016, she was dismissed from the Court of Appeal. However, she was reinstated as court of appeal justice in May 2017 following the resignation of Adama Barrow.

In 2013, she was elected as the commissioner in the African Union Commission on International Law (AUCIL). In October 2017, she became the head of Institute for Human Rights and Development in Africa. In 2010, she was awarded the prestigious Order of the Republic of The Gambia by the then Gambian president Yahya Jammeh.
