= Khady Hane =

Senegalese writer

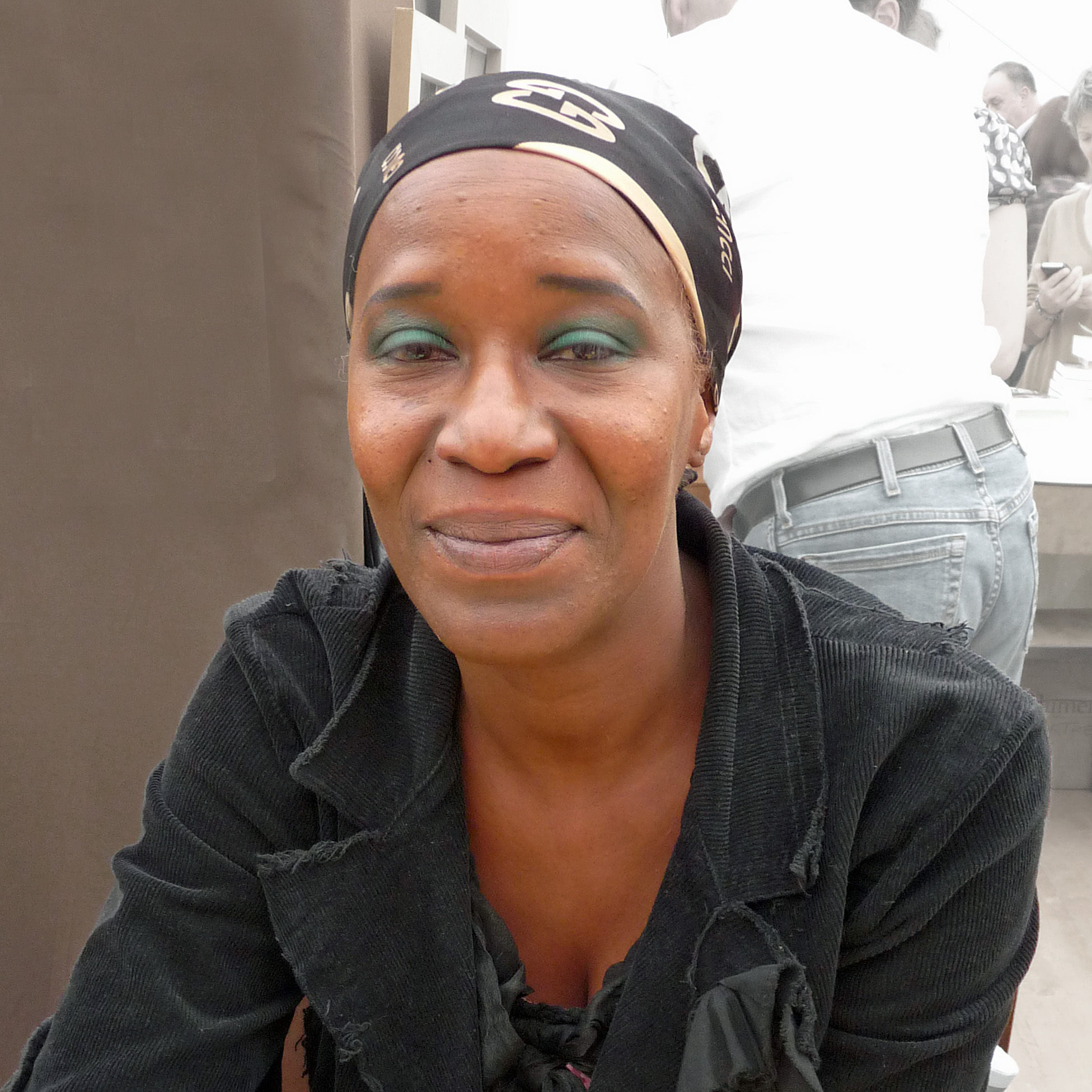
- Born: 1962 (age 63–64); Senegal
- Education: University of Paris
- Occupation: Author
- Writing career
- Language: French
- Genres: Novel; Theatre
- Notable works: Sous le regard des étoiles... (1998); Les violons de la haine (2001); Ma sale peau noire (2001); Le Collier de paille (2002); Il y en a trop dans les rues de Paris (2005)

Khady Hane (born 1962) is an author from Senegal. She received her education from the University of Paris and lives in Paris. She is president of an association called "Black Arts and Culture" and has written a number of novels in French.

== Bibliography ==
- Sous le regard des étoiles... [Under the gaze of the stars]. Dakar: NEAS, 1998 (Novel).
- Les violons de la haine Paris: Manuscrit.com, 2001. Novel.
- Ma sale peau noire Paris: Manuscrit.com, 2001. Novel.
- Le Collier de paille Libreville: Editions Ndzé, 2002. (183p.). ISBN 2-911464-14-1 Novel.
- Il y en a trop dans les rues de Paris Bertoua, Cameroun: Editions Ndzé, 2005, (78p.) ISBN 2-911464-26-5. Theatre.
