= Aisha Mahmoud Hamman =

Nigerian professor

Academic background
- Education: Ahmadu Bello University

Academic work
- Discipline: Accounting and Finance
- Institutions: Ahmadu Bello University

Aisha Mahmoud Hamman is a Nigerian professor of accounting and finance at Ahmadu Bello University, Zaria. She serves as Special Adviser on Research and Statistics to the Executive Chairman of the Nigeria Revenue Service (NRS). Her work spans taxation, tax policy and administration, revenue research, financial reporting, corporate governance, Islamic accounting and non-interest banking. Through her academic and professional work, she has contributed to research and initiatives connecting taxation, public finance and policy development.

== Early life and education ==
Aisha Mahmoud Hamman grew up in the Ahmadu Bello University (ABU) community in Zaria, Kaduna State. Her father, Professor Mahmoud Hamman, was a historian at the university, while her mother, Professor Khadija Mahmoud, was an academic in educational psychology. Hamman’s education began at the ABU Kongo Crèche, after which she attended ABU Staff School for her primary education and ABU Demonstration Secondary School for her secondary education.

She subsequently attended Ahmadu Bello University, where she obtained all her academic degrees. Her educational qualifications include a bachelor’s degree in accounting, a master’s degree in banking and finance, an MSc in Accounting and Finance, and a PhD in Accounting and Finance. She continued her professional career at the university, where she eventually attained the rank of professor.

== Career ==
Hamman began her career as a mathematics teacher at Demonstration Secondary School (DSS), ABU, Zaria. She later worked as an accountant in the university’s Bursary Department before transitioning to academia as a lecturer in the Department of Accounting and eventually rising to the rank of professor. Alongside teaching and research, she held administrative and leadership responsibilities, including serving as deputy director of the International Centre of Excellence for Rural Finance and Entrepreneurship (ICERFE), participating in academic committees and representing the ABU Business School at the university’s Senate.

Hamman’s research in taxation and public finance has examined the relationship between macroeconomic conditions, government policy, administrative measures and tax revenue performance in Nigeria. Through her engagement with the African Tax Administration Forum (ATAF), she has contributed to tax-research and capacity-building activities, including serving as a resource person in training programmes for tax professionals. Her participation in tax-research initiatives, including the African Multidisciplinary Tax Journal, has connected her academic work with wider discussions on tax policy and administration. Her research has also contributed to evidence-based discussions on tax policy within the Nigerian tax system.

Her wider academic research spans accounting, corporate finance, corporate governance, financial reporting, environmental disclosure, banking and Islamic finance. Her studies have examined corporate financial practices, dividend policy, monitoring mechanisms and the quality of environmental disclosures by Nigerian companies. She has also researched accounting concepts from an Islamic perspective and the relationship between conventional and Islamic finance and economic development in West Africa, drawing on financial data from the World Bank and the Islamic Development Bank.

A substantial part of Hamman’s research has focused on Islamic accounting, non-interest banking and Shariah governance. Her publications have examined the role of Shariah review, advisory committees and religious rulings in the development of products offered by non-interest financial institutions in Nigeria. She also co-authored the book Islamic Accounting and Finance: Principles and Concepts. Her contributions to Islamic finance have been described using the phrase “the mother of Islamic finance.

== Works ==
- Effect of Shari'ah Review and Fatawa on Product Development of Non Interest Financial Institutions in Nigeria
- A Test of Free Cash Flow Hypothesis: Evidence from Nigerian Quoted Food & Beverages Firms
- Tax Reform Bills Meant to Harmonise Scattered Laws: A Path to a More Competent Tax Regime in Nigeria
- Evaluating the Economic and Environmental Impact of Implementing a Carbon Tax for Revenue Generation in Nigeria
- Free Cash Flow, Managerial Ownership and Agency Cost: Evidence from Nigerian Listed Conglomerates
