= Mata Sy Diallo =

Senegalese politician

- Born: 1945 (age 80–81)
- Citizenship: Senegalese
- Occupation: Politician

Mata Sy Diallo (born c. 1945) is a Senegalese politician.

== Biography ==
Known as the "lion of Ndoukoumane", her birthplace, Diallo comes from a modest background. She began her career in local politics in Kaolack before rising to national prominence. She served in the cabinet as minister for immigration from 1991 to 1992; she was the vice-president of the National Assembly from 1995 to 2001, and in 2003 was elected president of the Mouvement National des Femmes de l'Espoir et du Progrès. She has also been active in the leadership of the Socialist Party of Senegal. She is a member of the Toucouleur people, and was also active early in her career in Kaffrine.
