= Lamido Yuguda =

Former Nigerian director general

Lamido Yuguda is the former director general of the Securities and Exchange Commission in Federal Republic of Nigeria.

== Education ==
Lamido Yuguda is a graduate from the Ahmadu Bello University, Zaria, where he obtained B.Sc. in accounting in 1983. in 1991, He proceeded to further his studies at University of Birmingham, England, where he obtained M.Sc. in money, banking and finance.

He also has a certificate in financial asset management and engineering from the Swiss Finance Institute, Geneva, Switzerland.

== Career ==
Lamido Yuguda who is the former DG Securities and Exchange Commission in Federal Republic of Nigeria assumed this office based on appointment given to him by Muhammadu Buhari. He served in this position from 2020 to 2024.

He was the former director at the Central Bank of Nigeria (CBN). Before he was a director in Central Bank of Nigeria (CBN), Lamido Yuguda has served in several departments in the Central Bank of Nigeria (CBN) some of which include working at the Director of the Reserve Management Department from 2010 t0 2016, Senior Supervisor, Foreign Operations Department in 1984, Banking Supervision Department in 1985 etc.

Lamido Yuguda joined the International Monetary Fund (IMF) Washington DC in the year 1997 as an economist in the Africa Department.
