= Khady Koita =

Senegalese women's rights activist

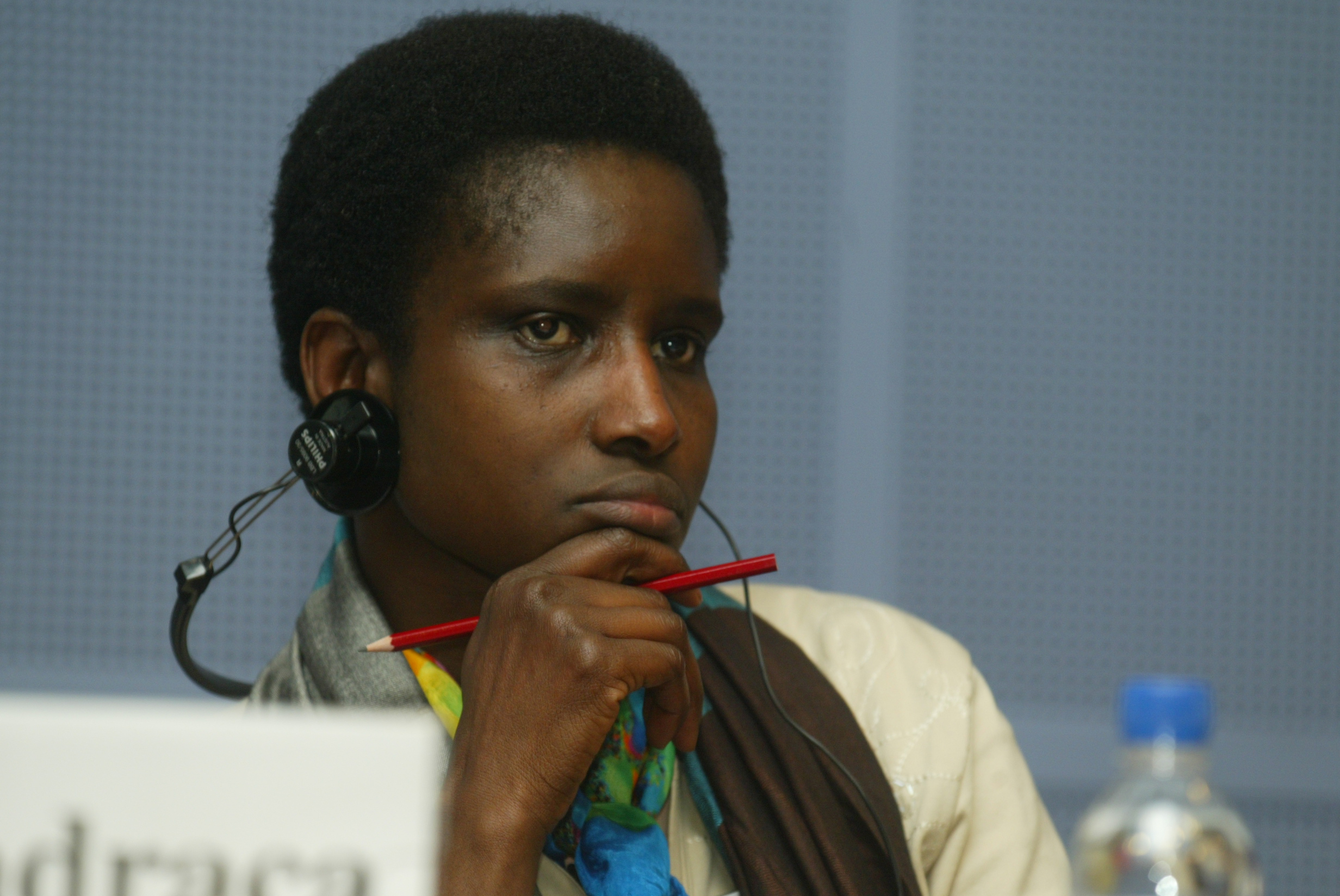
- Khady Koita in 2003
- Born: 1959 (age 66–67); Thiès
- Occupation: Activist

Khady Koita (born 18 October 1959) is a Senegalese activist against violence against women and female genital mutilation.

== Biography ==
Koita was born in Senegal and raised by her grandmother in the Thiès Region. She underwent genital mutilation at the age of seven, forced to marry her cousin in her teenage years. She told Le Figaro that "[she] did not say anything because [her] upbrining did not allow [her] to say 'no'." One year later, she was forced to emigrate to France, and lived with her cousin during sixteen years. She gave birth to her first child at the age of sixteen. Two years later, her husband married a second wife (co-wife) against Khady's consent. Suffering from violence, Khady managed to flee with her children and divorced in 1988.

Since 1996, Koita has lived in Belgium. She co-founded the Group for the Abolition of Female Genital Mutilation (GAMS) in Belgium and became the chairwoman of La Palabre, an association that helps women in Senegal. She is an activist against female genital mutilation a women's rights advocate. Since 2002, she has been the chairwoman of Euronet MGF (the European Network for the Prevention and Eradication of Female Genital Mutilation).

Her French-language book Mutilée ("Mutilated") was published by Oh Editions in 2006. An English language version, "Blood Stains. A Child of Africa Reclaims her Human Rights" appeared in 2010 published by UnCUTVOICES Press (Frankfurt am Main) and translated by Tobe Levin.

In 2007, Koita was awarded the Belgian Burgerschapsprijs Stichting P&V.
