= Boubacar Alpha Bah =

Malian economist and minister (born 1941)

- Born: March 20, 1941
- Other name: Bill
- Occupations: Economist, minister

Boubacar Alpha Bah (known as Bill, born March 20, 1941) is a Malian economist and minister.

Bah studied economics in France at the University of Paris and the University of Caen Normandy. After returning to Mali in 1978, he worked in his own businesses and as a consultant for international development cooperation organizations. Bah has served as Mali's representative at the West African Central Bank BCEAO and the World Bank, as Deputy Minister in charge of private sector promotion from 1992 to 1992, as the mayor of Bamako's fifth district from 2009, and as the chairman of Mali's municipal association from 2010.

Bah is a former activist of the Malian Party of Labour and ADEMA. He was appointed as the Minister of Territorial Administration and Decentralization in Boubou Cissé's government in May 2019.
