= Abdoulaye Diori Kadidiatou Ly =

President of the Constitutional Court of Niger
- In office 2013–2019
- Succeeded by: Bouba Mahmane

Mrs Abdoulaye Diori born Kadiatou Ly (5 March 1952 – 12 December 2020) is a Nigerien jurist. She has been President of the Constitutional Court of Niger, having held this position from 2013 to 2019.

She is the second woman to hold the position of President of the Constitutional Court of Niger (the first being Salifou Fatimata Bazeye).

== Early life and education ==
Born in 1952 in Niamey, Kadidiatou originally worked as a midwife. She then decided to study at the University of Niamey and in 2005 she obtained a doctorate in public law from the University of Paris-Saclay. She was married to the late Abdoulaye Hamani Diori.

In 2013, she is elected President of the Constitutional Court of Niger.

In 2019, Bouba Mahmane succeeds her at the head of the Constitutional Court of Niger.

Mrs. Abdoulaye Diori died on the evening of 12 December 2020.
