= Shehu Atiku =

Nigerian judge (1950–2020)

Justice Shehu Atiku

Chief Judge High Court of Justice Kano State
- In office 2008–2015
- Governor: Ibrahim Shekarau; Rabiu Kwankwaso
- Succeeded by: Patricia Mahmoud

Personal details
- Born: 10 January 1950 Kano State, Nigeria
- Died: 27 September 2020 (aged 70) Kano
- Spouse: 1
- Children: 8
- Education: LLB BL
- Alma mater: Ahmadu Bello University, Zaria; Nigerian Law School Lagos
- Occupation: Judge

Shehu Atiku (10 January 1950 – 27 September 2020) was a Nigerian judge and the former Chief Judge of Kano State High Court of Justice.

== Early life and education ==
Atiku was born on January 10, 1950 in Unguwar Gini of Kano Municipal Local Government Area, Kano State.

Atiku started his education in Kwalli Special Primary School, between 1960 and 1966, he move to School for Arabic Studies, Kano between 1967 and 1972, he attended Ahmadu Bello University Zaria between 1973 and 1977 where she obtained Bachelor of Laws he went to Nigerian Law School where he was trained as legal practitioner and he was called to bar in the year 1977.

== Career ==
Atiku was a state Counsel in the Kano State Ministry of Justice from 1978 where he rose to the position of Director in 1986 and become the Solicitor-General in 1988, and he was appointed Kano State High Court judge in 1990.

He was also sworn-in as Chief Judge of Kano State High Court of Justice in 2008 where he served for eight years and retired in 2015

== Death ==
Atiku died on 27 September 2020 in Kano after brief illness, in Kano-Nigeria leaving behind a wife and eight children .
