= Suwaiba Ahmad =

Nigerian academic

Minister of State for Education
- Incumbent
- Assumed office 23 October 2024
- Appointed by: Bola Tinubu

Personal details
- Born: Suwaiba Sa'idu Ahmad; 13 February 1981 (age 45) Babura, Jigawa State
- Citizenship: Nigeria
- Education: Bayero University Kano (BEd | MEd); Ahmadu Bello University (PhD)

Suwaiba Sa'idu Ahmad (born 13 February 1981) is a Nigerian academic and Professor of Science Education who is serving as the Minister of State for Education since 23 October 2024. Prior to her appointment, Ahmad served as the provost of Jigawa State College of Education.

== Early life and education ==
Suwaiba Sa'idu Ahmad was born in Babura, Jigawa State on 13 February 1981 into Sa'idu family. Ahmad attended Bayero University Staff Primary School for her primary and secondary education. She graduated with a bachelor in science education in 2003 and a master of education in curriculum studies in 2009 from Bayero University and a PhD in science education from Ahmadu Bello University in 2014.

== Career ==
Ahmad was the head of department of Science Education from 2018 to 2020 and was the Sub-Dean Academics in the Faculty of Education before being elevated to an associate professor of chemistry education. From 2020 to 2024, Ahmad was the director of Center of Gender Studies and later as the provost of Jigawa State College of Education, Ringim. As of 2024, Ahmad is the current minister of state for education following her appointment by President Bola Tinubu and confirmation by the Senate.

On 27 December 2024, the Governing Council of Bayero University Kano, promoted her to a full Professor in the field of science education.
