= Idi Mukhtar Maiha =

Nigerian politician

Idi Mukhtar Maiha is a Nigerian politician. He currently serves as the Honourable Minister of Livestock Development.

== Biography ==
He was born in Maiha Local Government, Adamawa State. He graduated from Ahmadu Bello University with a degree in political science and obtained a master's degree in Political Science from Ahmadu Bello University.

== Career ==
He has been a career NNPC staff for over two decades culminating in his appointment as the Managing Director of the Kaduna Refining and Petrochemical Company (KRPC).

He is the managing director and CEO of Zaidi Farms Ltd.

In October 2024, Idi Mukhtar Maiha was appointed by President Bola Ahmed Tinubu as the Minister of the Ministry of Livestock Development.
