= Aisha Dikko =

Commissioner of justice Kaduna State

Ministry of Justice (Kaduna State)
- In office 2019–2023
- Governor: Nasir Ahmad el-Rufai

Personal details
- Born: Kaduna State
- Education: Ahmadu Bello University; Nigerian Law School

Aisha Dikko is the former attorney general and Commissioner of Justice for Ministry of Justice (Kaduna State). She was sworn as attorney general and Commissioner of Justice of Kaduna State on 12 July 2019 under the governance of Nasir Ahmad el-Rufai.

== Education ==
Dikko is a graduate of law. She obtained her degree from Ahmadu Bello University in 1987, and later attended the Nigerian Law School, Victoria Island, Lagos. She joined the Nigerian Bar Association in 1988.

== Career ==
Dikko began her career as a trainee officer in the legal department of Habib Bank Limited. She worked in the banking sector for 17 years and became the substantive manager. She later joined the private sector, becoming the principal partner of the Messrs Dikko, Khalil & Co (Barristers and Solicitors) law firm.

She was appointed by the Governor of Kaduna State as the senior special assistant on legal matters at the public service. Later she became special adviser on legal matters and head of the Special Investigation and Prosecution Unit. On 12 July 2019 she was sworn in as the Attorney-General & Commissioner of Justice.

== Personal life ==
Dikko is the daughter of kastina state governor Dikko Umaru Radda, she is married to Ahmad Usman Hausa legendary from Daura Emirate.
