= Mamadou Diallo Sory =

Nigerien Politician and Diplomat

Minister of Justice Niger
- In office 22 April 1974 – 30 November 1974

Minister of Justice, Posts and Telecommunications
- In office 30 November 1974 – 3 June 1975

Minister of Public Service and Labour
- In office 3 June 1975 – 21 February 1976

Minister of Public Service, Labour, Posts and Telecommunications
- In office 21 February 1976 – 7 June 1976

Minister of the Interior Niger
- In office 7 June 1976 – 10 September 1979

Minister of Posts and Telecommunications
- In office 10 September 1979 – 9 February 1981
- In office 18 March 1981 – 26 October 1987

Personal details
- Born: December 27, 1927 Maïné-Soroa, Niger
- Died: January 19, 1996 (aged 68) Niamey, Niger
- Awards: National Order of the Niger Grand Cross Officer's Cross, 1st Class Knight of the Legion of Honour Knight of the National Order of Merit (France) Mauritanian Order of Merit (Knight) Croix de la Valeur militaire (gold star) Médaille militaire (France)

Military service
- Allegiance: Niger
- Branch/service: Niger Armed Forces
- Years of service: 1947–1987
- Rank: Lieutenant colonel
- Commands: Defense Zone No. 2 (Agadez)

Mamadou Diallo Sory (27 December 1927, Maïné-Soroa – 19 January 1996, Niamey) was a Nigerien officer, politician, and diplomat.

== Life ==
Mamadou Diallo Sory attended primary school in Maïné-Soroa and regional school in Zinder. In 1947, he joined the French Armed Forces as a Tirailleurs sénégalais.. He served in Niger, Metropolitan France, and Algeria, reaching the rank of Adjutant in 1958. When the Armed Forces of Niger were established in 1961, Sory transferred and continued his career there. In 1972, he became commander of Defense Zone No. 2 in Agadez, holding the rank of Major from 1973.

Sory was among the officers who carried out the15 April 1974 Nigerien coup d'état, which overthrew President Hamani Diori. From then until December 1989, he was a member of the country's military junta during the Supreme Military Council under Seyni Kountché. Between 1974 and 1981, he held several ministerial posts:

- From 22 April 1974: Minister of Justice (Niger)
- From 30 November 1974: Minister of Justice, Posts and Telecommunications
- From 3 June 1975: Minister of Public Service and Labour
- From 21 February 1976: Minister of Public Service, Labour, Posts and Telecommunications
- From 7 June 1976: Minister of the Interior (Niger)
- From 10 September 1979 to 9 February 1981: Minister of Posts and Telecommunications

In 1979, he was promoted to Lieutenant colonel. From 18 March 1981 to 26 October 1987, he served as Niger's ambassador to Egypt. He retired from the armed forces in 1987 but remained a member of the Supreme Military Council until its dissolution in December 1989.

== Honors ==
- Grand Cross of the National Order of the Niger (1987)
- Officer's Cross, 1st Class of the Order of Merit of the Federal Republic of Germany (1969)
- Knight of the Legion of Honour (1972)
- Knight of the Ordre national du Mérite (France) (1967)
- Knight of the Mauritanian Order of Merit (1969)
- Recipient of the French Croix de la Valeur militaire with gold star (1956)
- Recipient of the French Médaille militaire (1971)
