= Aisha Abubakar Abdulwahab =

Nigerian policewoman

Aisha Abubakar Baju OON, mni
- Born: Aishatu Abubakar; 10 July 1971 (age 55); Biu, Adamawa, Nigeria
- Education: PhD in Veterinary Science, University of Plymouth
- Occupation: Nigeria policewoman (1995)
- Employer: Nigeria Police Force
- Known for: proposing novel research to study tuberculosis
- Title: Dr
- Children: 3
- Awards: UNESCO fellowship award

Dr. Aisha Abubakar Abdulwahab Baju is a Nigerian policewoman who won a UNESCO fellowship award to study tuberculosis. Aisha Abubakar Baju was promoted to the rank of Assistant Inspector General of Police (AIG) in 2023. This promotion highlights her significant contributions to the Nigerian Police Force and her role as a veterinary doctor. Until her promotion, she was the commissioner of Police, and Head of Nigerian Police Force Animal Branch, Abuja. She was in charge of palliative support program at the force Headquarters, Abuja during the coronavirus pandemic.

== Early life and education ==
Aisha Abubakar Baju was born on 10 July 1971 in Biu, Adamawa State, Nigeria. She attended Gombi II primary school, Gombi (1975 – 1981) and Government Science Secondary School, Hong (1981 – 1986) both in Adamawa State. She graduated with the degree of Doctor of Veterinary Medicine (DVM) from Ahmadu Bello University, Zaria in 1994 and obtained a PhD degree from the University of Plymouth, UK in 2007. She joined the Nigerian Police Force in 1995, after her one-year mandatory national service.

== Work ==
In 2005, she was awarded a UNESCO fellowship for her proposal to use DNA to identify the link between human and bovine tuberculosis. By taking samples from cows and people she could evaluate the risk that Nigerians took when they drank unpasteurized milk. The award was to enable her to complete the research at any university.

She emerged as the Monitor General Senior Executive Course (SEC) 44, 2022 of the National Institute for Policy and Strategic Studies (NIPSS), Kuru in Plateau State.

== Personal life ==
Abdulwahab is married with three children. Her daughter, Binta Abdulwahab, is a graduate from Nottingham Trent University in the UK and together they have opened SAB foundation to help women in rural areas.
