= Moustapha Mamy Diaby =

Guinean politician

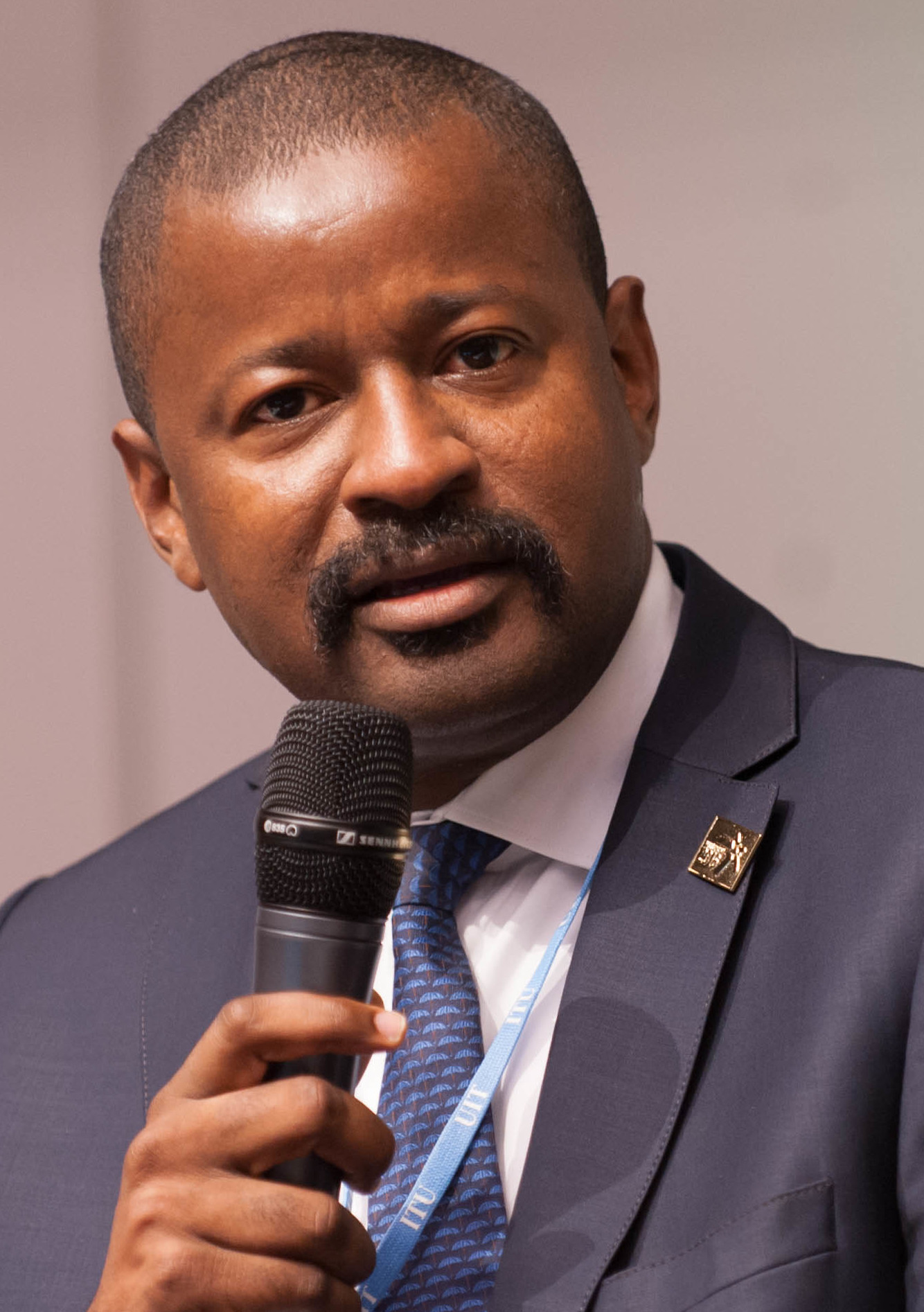
- Moustapha Mamy Diaby in May 2016 at the World Summit on the Information Society

Ministry of Mail, Telecommunications and the digital Economy
- In office 2015–2020
- President: Alpha Condé
- Prime Minister: Ibrahima Kassory Fofana
- Preceded by: Oyé Lamah Guilavogui
- Succeeded by: Saïd Oumar Koulibaly

Personal details
- Born: 1971 (age 54–55)

Moustapha Mamy Diaby is a Guinean politician, engineer and businessman. He is a former Minister of Mail, Telecommunications and Digital Economy, serving from 2016 to 2020. Before that, he served as the Director General of the Postal and Telecommunications Regulation Authority.
