= Diallo Sène =

Malian statistician and administrator

Diallo Sene
- Born: July 1952 (age 74); Bamako, Mali
- Education: European Centre for Training of Statisticians-Economists from Developing Countries [fr] (CESD) Demographic Centre of Romania (CEDOR)

Diallo M'Bodji Sène (born July 1952) is a statistician and administrator from Mali who served as Mali's Minister for the Promotion of Women, Children, and the Family.

== Early life and education ==
Sène was born in July 1952 in Bamako Mali. She earned a Diplôme d'Ingénieur (the equivalent of a master's degree) in statistics in 1974 in France through the European Centre for Training of Statisticians-Economists from Developing Countries (CESD). She earned a second degree in 1978 at the Demographic Centre of Romania (CEDOR). She also earned specialty diplomas in computer programming at the Centre d'études pratiques d'informatique et d'automatique (CEPIA, the centre for practical studies in computer science and automation) in Versailles, France in 1986, and at the African Institute of Computer Science (IAI) in Libreville, Gabon in 1989.

== Career and later life ==
From 1975 to 1991, Sène worked in Mali's National Directorate of Statistics and Informatics, the predecessor to the current Institut national de la statistique (Mali) (National Institute of Statistics).

In 1991–1992, and again in 1997–2000, she was a technical advisor in the Ministère du Plan et de la Coopération internationale (ministry of planning and international cooperation). In 1992–1993, she was a project manager at the Ministère de l’Economie, des Finances et du Plan (ministry of economy, finances, and planning), and from 1993 to 1997 she was national economist for the Natcap project of the United Nations Development Programme (PNUD).

In 2000, she joined the Ministry for the Promotion of Women, Children and the Family (MPFEF) as a technical advisor. She became chief of staff and delegate head of the department of employment and professional promotion in 2002, and was confirmed as head of department in 2004. In 2005 she became the minister, serving until 2007. Her work at the ministry included literacy and citizenship education, the provision of equipment to women's organizations, and the development of rural training centers. In 2007, Sene introduced a report by the Committee on the Rights of the Child describing the many legislative, regulatory and administrative measures undertaken between 1999 and 2004 with regard to children's rights.

In 2009, she became head of the board of the Conseil de Régulation des Télécommunications (CRT, the telecommunications regulatory council), which in 2011 became the Malian Authority for the Regulation of Telecommunications, Information and Communication Technologies and Posts (AMRTP). She retired in 2013.
