= Bouli Ali Diallo =

Nigerien academic and activist (born 1948)

- Born: 1948 (age 77–78)
- Occupations: Academic, Activist

Bouli Ali Diallo (born 1948) is a Nigerien academic and activist.

== Life and career ==
Ali Diallo attended a number of teaching institutions early in her education, including the teachers' school Cours Normal at Tillabéri, which at the time accepted only women as students. She next attended the University of Dakar, where she studied chemistry and biology and earned a doctorate in applied microbiology in 1978, and the Science and Technology University of Languedoc in Montpellier, from which she earned her doctorat d'État in applied entomology in 1991.

She returned to Niger to teach biology at Abdou Moumouni University, a job which she had first taken in 1978. She has served in numerous administrative roles at the school as well; from 1987 to 1993 she was director of external relations, from 1993 to 1995 vice-rector, and from 1999 to 2005 rector. She was minister of national education in 1995 and 1996, and served as vice-president of the African Virtual University from 2002 until 2004.

She has been a member of the boards of the Institut de recherche pour le développement and the NGO Aide et Action, and from 1999 to 2004 presided over the Forum for African Women Educationalists, whose Nigerien chapter she founded. Ali Diallo has received numerous awards from France during her career, including the Ordre des Palmes Académiques, of which she is an officer, for her academic achievements. She has remained an activist in Niger, speaking on the need to develop educational opportunities for women.
