= Abdoulie Cham =

Alhaji Abdoulie Cham (born 24 August 1960) is the former Minister of Information and Communication Infrastructure (MOICI) of The Gambia Government, which was created on 6 May 2002. The Ministry has the role of a policymaker, liberalisation of the ICT sector and with a requisite function to provide an enabling environment for ICT sector. MOICI has a Technical Division, which was headed by the Deputy Permanent Secretary, Yankouba Toure.

== Role in telecommunications ==
Alhaji A. Cham played a key role in the establishment and management of the Gambia Telecommunications Cellular Company Limited (Gamcel) a subsidiary company of the Gambia Telecommunications Company Limited (Gamtel). Alhaji coordinated the development of the Terms of Reference (TOR) of the Global System for Mobile Communications (GSM) Project of Gamtel. He was the Project Manager for the installation of the GSM Network, the first of it kind in the country, which was commissioned on 25 May 2001.

Alhaji was the Team Leader for the installation of the first Electronic Telex Exchange (ELTEX ALPHA) of Gamtel in 1990 and was responsible for its operations and maintenance for several years.

== Lectures ==
Alhaji lectured Mathematics and the Principles of Telex, Fax and Cellular Services to technicians and Customer Care Staff of Gamtel and Gamcel for more than a decade.
