= Kaïta Kayentao Diallo =

Malian judge

President of the Supreme Court of Mali
- In office 2006 – 1 January 2011
- Appointed by: Amadou Toumani Touré

Kaïta Kayentao Diallo is a Malian judge who served as President of the Supreme Court of Mali from 2006 until 2011.

== Career ==
Diallo began her career as an investigating judge at the Mopti Court of First Instance in 1971. In 1985, she was the first woman appointed as a justice of the peace with extended jurisdiction in Bougouni.

Diallo served as chair of the Judicial section of the Supreme Court. She was appointed President of the Supreme Court of Mali by President Amadou Toumani Touré in May 2006, beginning her term on 20 July, the first woman to hold the position. She retired on 1 January 2011.

In 2011, Diallo was appointed to the Appeal Tribunal of the Organisation internationale de la Francophonie.
