= Folly Bah Thibault =

Guinean journalist

- Born: 1978 (age 47–48); Conakry, Guinea
- Education: Bachelor's degree, Howard University; United States; Master's degree American University; Washington, D.C.
- Occupations: Journalist, news anchor
- Employer: Al Jazeera English
- Known for: Founder of "Elle Ira à l'Ecole"
- Website: www.follybahthibault.com

Folly Bah Thibault (born 1978) is a Guinean journalist and senior presenter for Al Jazeera English. She is an advocate for education and the founder of Elle Ira à l'Ecole, a foundation promoting education for young girls in Guinea.

== Early life ==
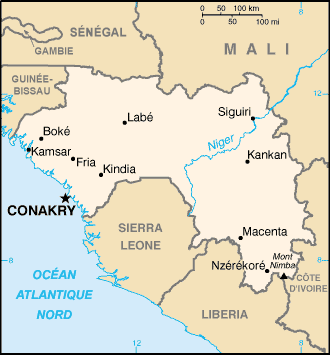
Conakry, Guinea

Thibault was born in Conakry, Guinea, in 1978. She spent her early childhood years in Conakry before her family relocated to Nairobi, Kenya, in 1987.

== Education ==
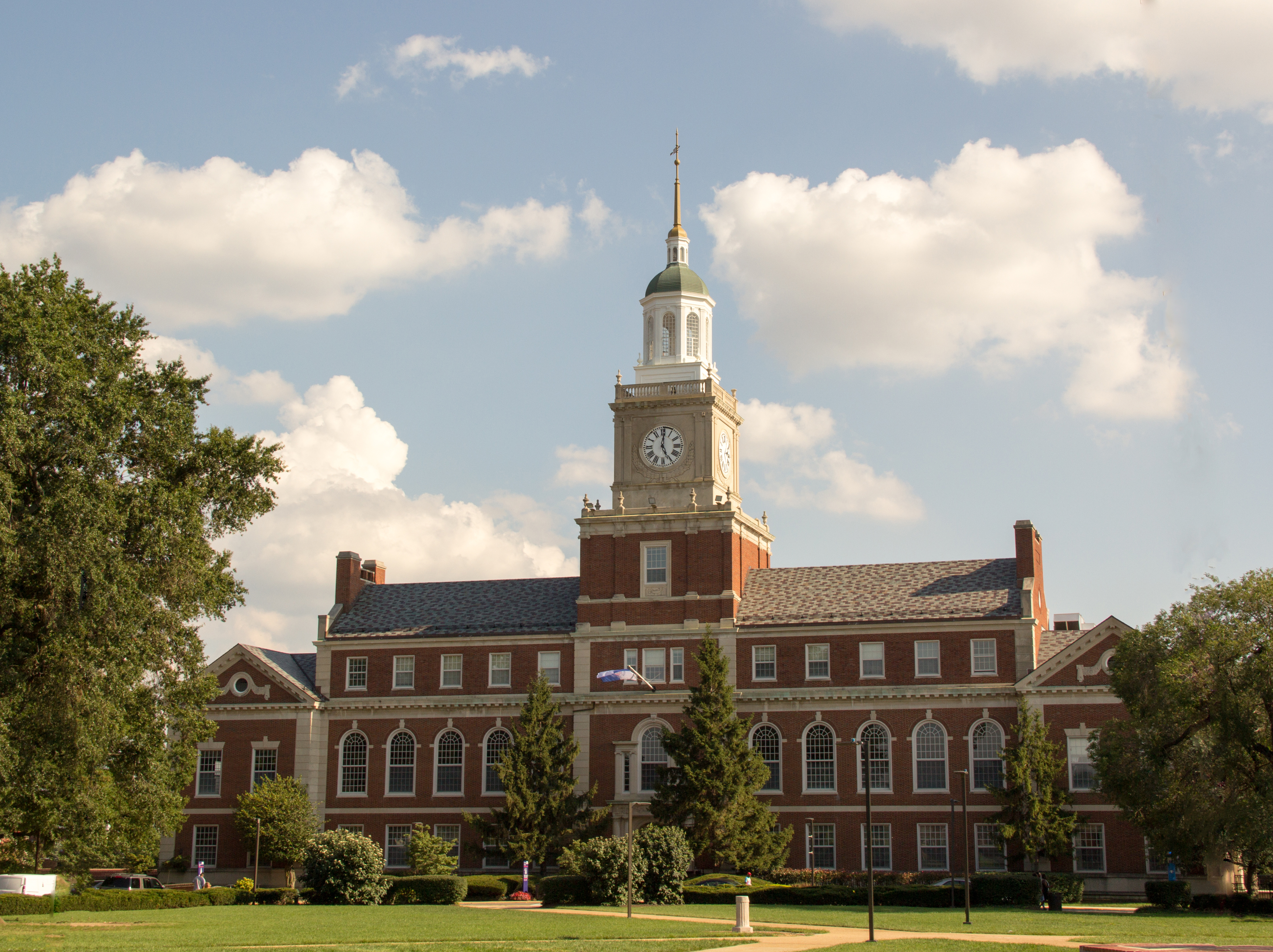
Howard University

Thibault obtained a baccalaureate in French literature with honours. She then pursued her higher education and earned a bachelor's degree in broadcast journalism from Howard University in the United States, and a master's degree in international communication from American University in Washington, D.C. She is fluent in French, English, and Peuhl; she also has a good understanding of Spanish and Swahili.

== Career ==
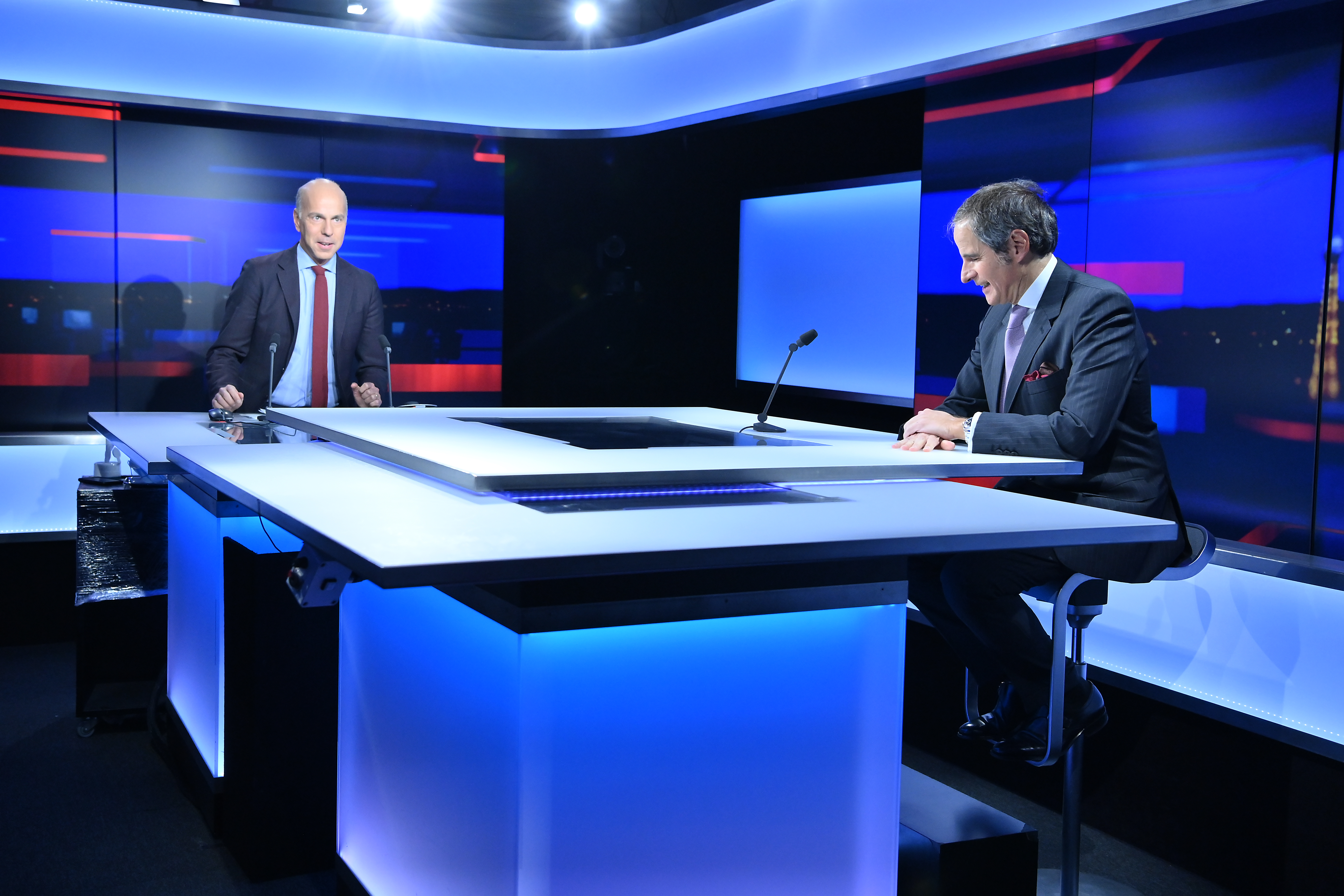
France 24 Television Studio

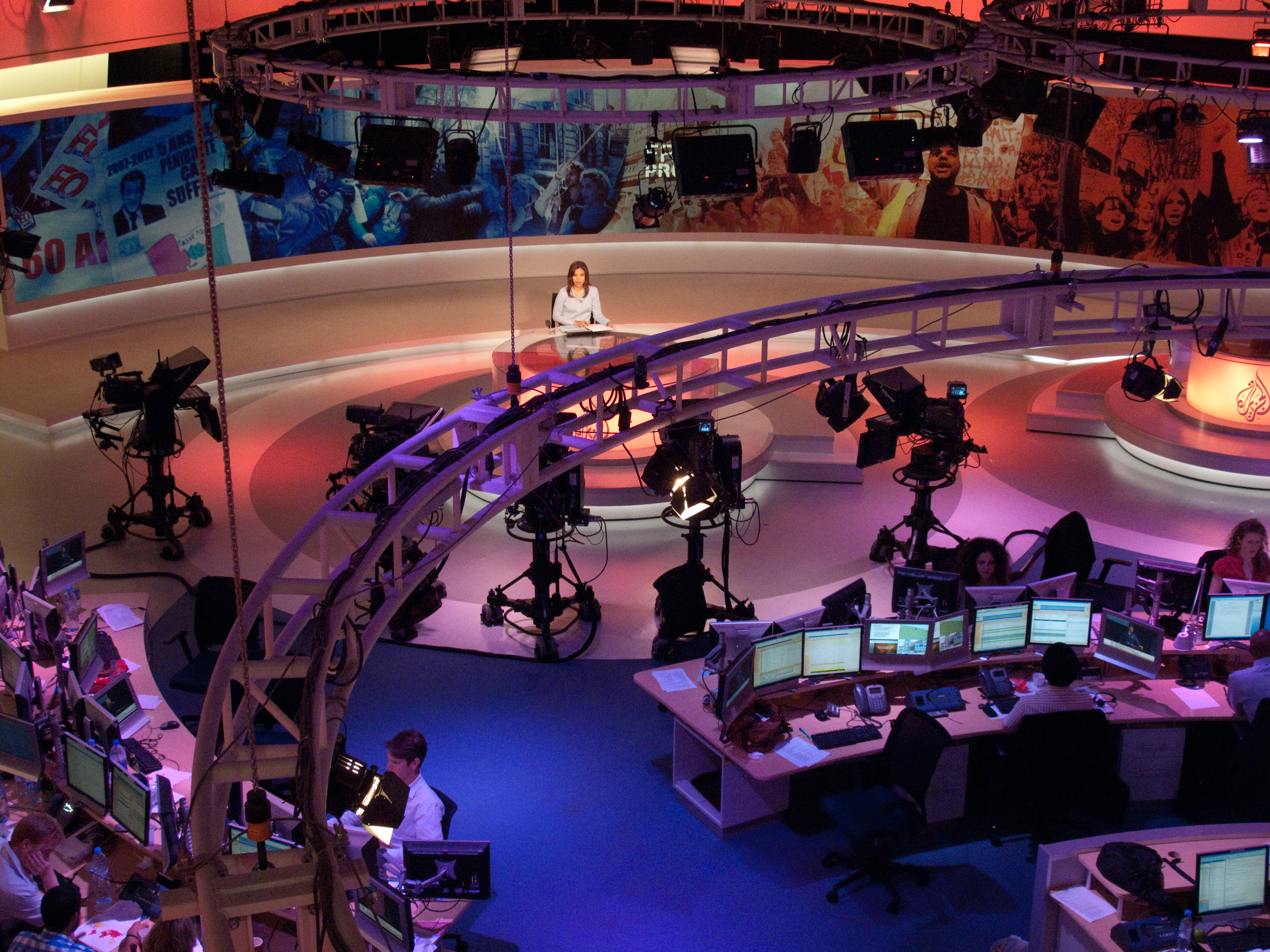
Al Jazeera English Newsroom

Thibault's broadcasting journey commenced nearly two decades ago at Voice of America in Washington D.C., where she hosted a show aimed at reuniting families separated by conflict in Sierra Leone and Liberia. She later worked for Radio France International in Paris before joining France 24 television as an anchor. In 2010, she became a principal presenter for Al Jazeera English. She has covered significant global events such as the Arab Spring and the conflicts in Syria, Yemen, and Libya. Her work has shed light on overlooked crises worldwide. Thibault hosted the first ever debate of candidates for United Nations Secretary General in July 2016 and cohosted the Nobel Peace Prize interview in Oslo in December 2016. She has interviewed Peace Prize laureates, including former Colombian president Juan Manuel Santos, Congolese rights activist Denis Mukwege, Kailash Satyarthi, and Iraqi campaigner Nadia Murad.

Thibault has also interviewed some of the world's top leaders, such as Amina Mohammed, the highest-ranking woman at the United Nations, serving as Deputy Secretary-General; France's far right leader Marine Le Pen; former Kenya president Uhuru Kenyatta; former Senegal president Macky Sall; Nigerian playwright and activist Wole Soyinka; and Senegalese–American musician Akon. She has extensively reported on global events of significant magnitude, including the 2004 tsunami and the historic election of Barack Obama as President of the United States in 2008. Thibault has moderated panel discussions and high-level summits for organisations including the United Nations, the European Union, the African Union, and the Brookings Centre.

In April 2023, Thibault was appointed as global champion for Education Cannot Wait, the United Nations global fund for education in emergencies and protracted crises.

== Personal life ==
Thibault is married and has three sons.
