= Aïssata Cissé =

Malian journalist (1945–2020)

- Born: 1945; Steinenkirch
- Died: 2020 (aged 74–75)
- Occupation: journalist

Aïssata Cissé (1945–April 29, 2020) was a Malian journalist. She was the first woman journalist in Mali and presented the radio and television news on the national Malian channels during her career.

== Biography ==
Aïssata Cissé was born in 1945 to a Dogon mother and a Peulh father.

After studying executive secretarial studies in Poland, she was recruited in 1959 by Mamadou El Béchir Gologo, a high-ranking official of the Sudanese Union – African Democratic Rally, then commissioner of information. Initially a radio journalist, she soon became a television presenter. She presented the news on Malian national radio and television from 1959 until her retirement in 2007, first on Radio Soudan, which then became Radio Mali and then ORTM. She is famous for her "Golden Voice" which opened the national radio every morning. She lent her voice for the national answering machine of the Malian Post & Telecommunications from the 1970s, as well as for many commercials. Highly respected in her profession, she trained several generations of journalists.

Divorced, she raised her children alone. In 1991, she lost one of her daughters, Ramatoulaye Dembélé, who died during the repression of democratic movements on March 22, 1991. Aïssata Cissé and her daughter both participated in the women's movements for democracy in March 1991, which led to the fall of the dictatorship of Moussa Traoré. Thereafter, Aïssata Cissé became one of the emblematic figures of the democratic movement in Mali.

When she retired in 2007, the newsroom of the national radio was renamed in her name.

After her retirement, she created the independent radio station Émergence where she continued to train young journalists. From 2009, she co-hosted with musician Boncana Maïga the program Tounkagouna, designed to discover new musical talent.

On April 30, 2020, the day after her death, a minute of silence was observed in memory of Aïssata Cissé at the opening of the Council of Ministers of Mali and the President of the Republic Ibrahim Boubacar Keïta paid tribute to her.
