= Mohamadou Bayero Fadil =

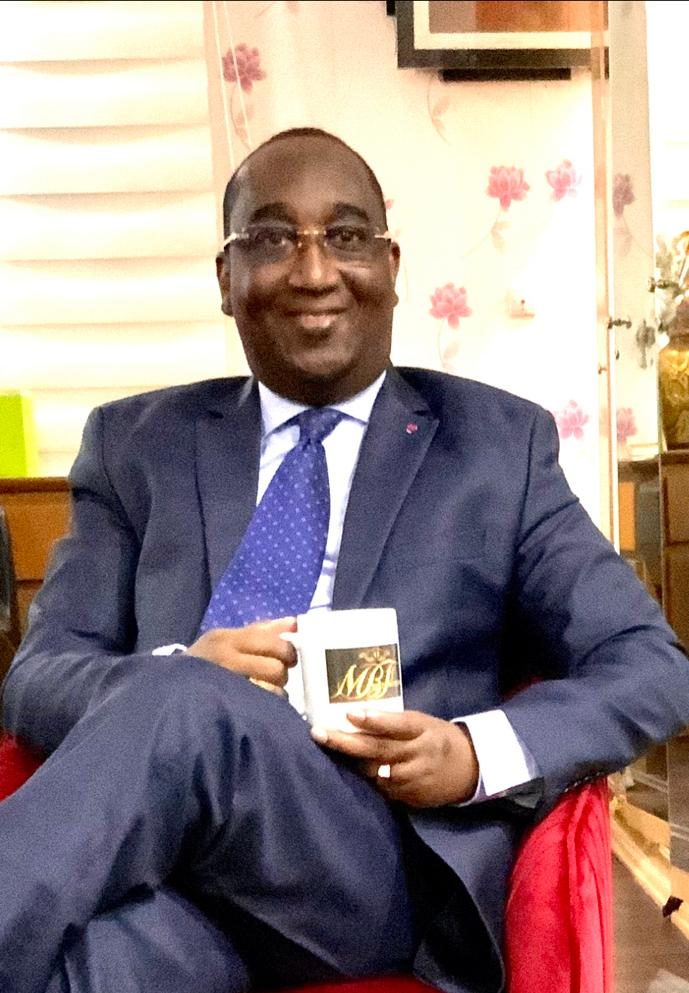

Head of the Board of Directors for the Agency of Standards and Quality.

Personal details
- Born: 19 December 1960 (age 65) Garoua, Cameroon
- Party: CPDM

Mohamadou Bayero Fadil (born 19 December 1960) is a Cameroonian businessman and politician, best known as chairman of MBF Holding and former president of the Fadil Group, one of Cameroon's long standing family who owned conglomerates. He is also a member of the Central Committee of the ruling Cameroon People's Democratic Movement (CPDM).

== Early life and family ==
Fadil was born in Garoua, his father El Hadj Abdoulaye Fadil, a businessman from Rabinga in northern Cameroon, and his mother Hadja Hawa Doudou from Garoua are member of the Fulani (Foulbé) ethnic group, traditionally associated with trade and cattle herding.

In 1999, Mohamadou Bayero Fadil married Fatima Gumsu, born in 1973 and originally from Nigeria. She is the daughter of former Nigerian president Sani Abacha. The couple had five children together: three sons and two daughters. From his first marriage, celebrated in 1986, Fadil had previously had six children (four sons and two daughters). After twenty years of marriage, the couple separated in December 2019.

On March 27, 2020, Dr. Mohamadou Bayero Fadil formalized his marriage to Habiba, the daughter of businessman Elhadj Bouba Zra Doua, originally from Mogode Mokolo in Cameroon's Far North Region. Her family has been living in the New Bell neighborhood of Douala since 1978.

== Education ==
Fadil studied in the United States, earning a degree in management economics from Bates College in Maine. He later pursued coursework in industrial organization at Georgetown University and the Brooklyn Polytechnic Institute (now NYU Tandon School of Engineering).

== Career ==
=== Groupe Fadil ===
After returning to Cameroon, Fadil joined the Cameroonian Chemical Complex (CCC) as chief financial officer before becoming general manager. In 1994, After the death of his father He took over leadership of the Groupe Fadil created in 1944 by his father.

Under his leadership, the group expanded into several sectors, including agriculture (CAIC), livestock (SOGEDEL), real estate (SIFI), hospitality (Lagon Bleu), media (Equatorial Media Group), and consumer goods such as soaps (TIKO SOAP).

In 2008, the group increased the CCC's industrial land holdings in Douala's Bassa zone, strengthening its manufacturing base. In the 2010s, the group completed a major debt restructuring, reportedly clearing about 5.5 billion CFA francs in liabilities.

In 2021, reports emerged alleging that Fadil had concluded a sale of the CCC to Chinese investors without prior approval from the company's board or his extended family, triggering internal disagreements.

=== MBF Holding ===
In 2017, Fadil founded MBF Holding, a modernized restructuring of the former family group, with investments in large-scale agriculture, livestock production, real estate, civil engineering, cosmetics, maritime trade, and media.

== Public functions and social engagement ==
Fadil serves as chairman of the board of the Cameroon Standards and Quality Agency (ANOR). He is also the vice-president of the board of the Institute of Standardization of Islamic Countries (INMPI).In 2011, a major avenue in Douala was named after his family patriarch, Avenue El Hadj Fadil Abdoulaye. He has carried out various political assignments for the party, including participation in electoral campaigns in Bafoussam (1997), the Western Region (2002), Abong-Mbang (2007), and in Yagoua and Mindif (2008–2009). He has also taken part in several official trips abroad alongside President Paul Biya, notably during the 2010 France–Africa Summit in Nice, where he spoke on issues related to corporate social responsibility. In addition, he has held the position of alternate senator within the RDPC. Bayero Fadil's commitment extends advocate for the cause of underprivileged youth, specifically those in need in Garoua and more broadly throughout Cameroon.stand with the distressed people of the Far North.

Committed to finding solutions to global development challenges, he has been involved in several international initiatives as a member and consultant for the World Economic Forum (WEF) and the EMRC Africa Finance & Investment Forum, among others.
