= Banata Tchale Sow =

Chadian politician

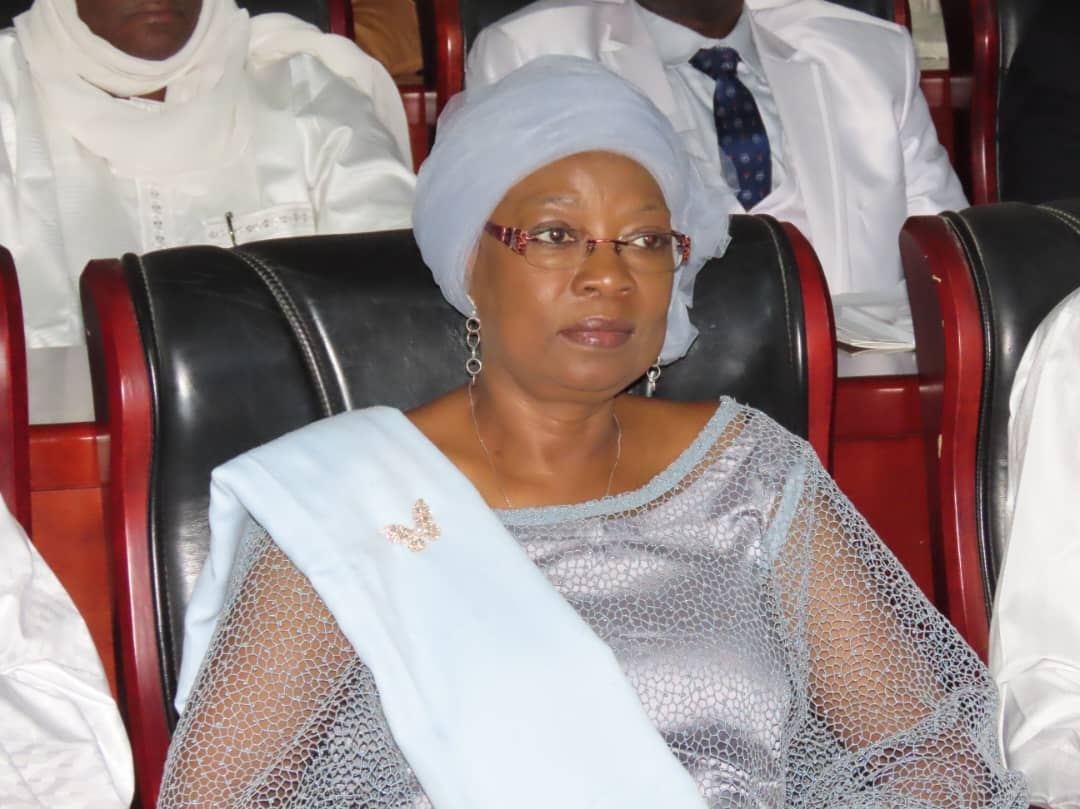

Technical Advisor to the Prime Minister of Chad (microfinance and sustainable development)
- In office June 2009 – February 2013

Technical Advisor for Economic and Budgetary Affairs, Presidency of the Republic
- In office February 2013 – October 2013

Minister of Microcredits for the Promotion of Women and Youth
- In office October 2013 – April 2014

Secretary of State for Finance and Budget (microfinance)
- In office April 2014 – August 2015

Secretary General of the Court of Auditors
- In office November 2015 – August 2016

Secretary of State for Infrastructure and Opening up
- In office August 2016 – February 2017

Secretary of State for Finance and Budget
- In office 5 February 2017 – 21 November 2017

Chief of Staff to the President of Chad
- Incumbent
- Assumed office June 2018

Personal details
- Born: Chad
- Occupation: Economist, politician
- Profession: Economist
- Known for: Microfinance and women’s empowerment

Banata Tchale Sow is a Chadian economist and politician woman.

== Career ==
From June 2009 to February 2013, Sow was a technical advisor to the Prime Minister of Chad for microfinance and sustainable development.

From February 2013 to October 2013, Sow was a technical advisor for Economic and Budgetary Affairs at the Presidency of the Republic.

From October 2013 to April 2014, Sow held the post of Minister of Microcredits for the Promotion of Women and Youth.

From April 2014 to August 2015, Sow was the Secretary of State for Finance and Budget in charge of microfinance.

From November 2015 to August 2016, Sow was the Secretary General of the Court of Auditors.

From August 2016 to February 2017, Sow was the Secretary of State for Infrastructure and Opening up.

From February 5, 2017, to November 21, 2017, Sow was the Secretary of State for Finance and Budget.

As of June 2018, Sow was the Chief of Staff to the President of Chad.
