= Khady Diallo =

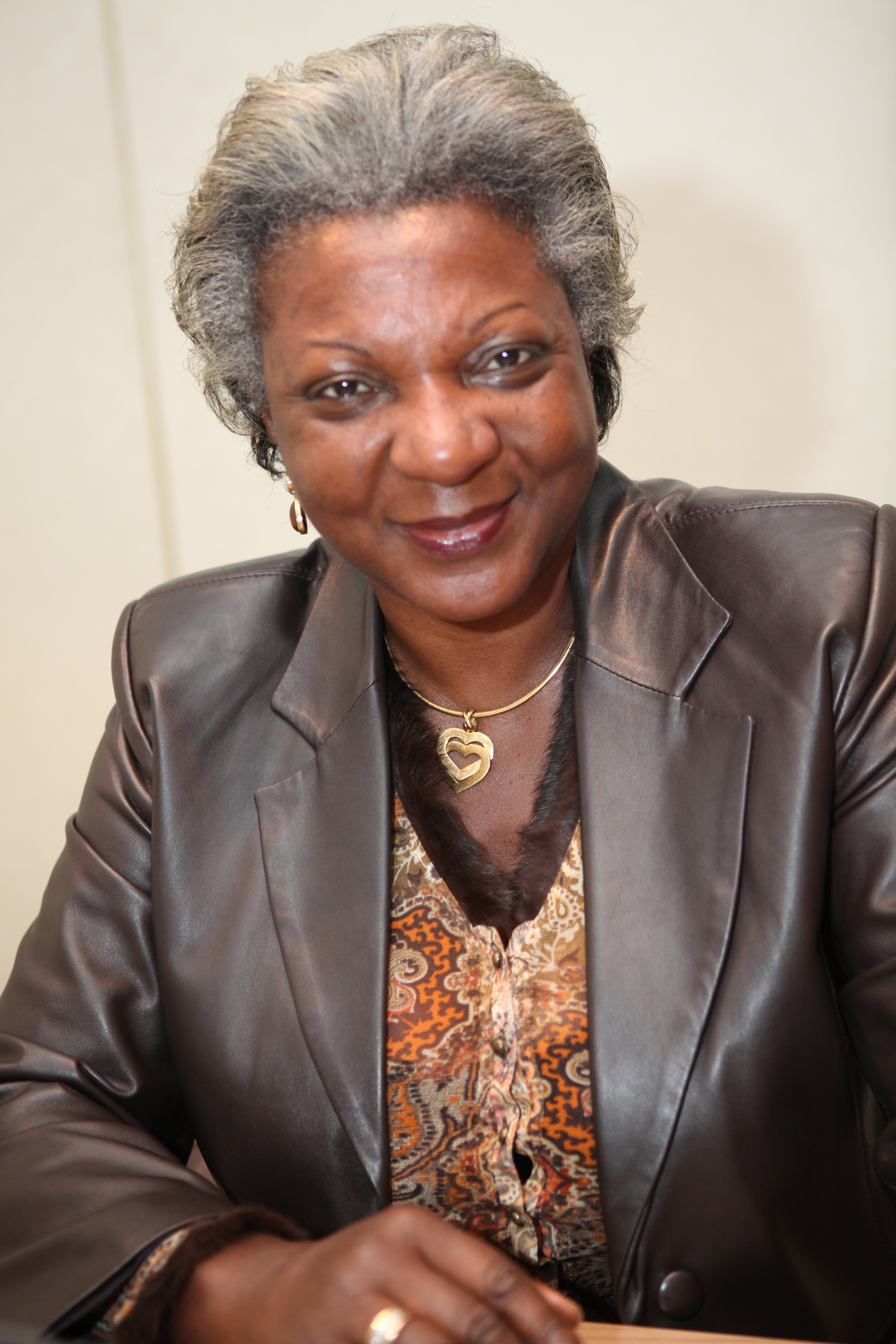
- Born: 1955 (age 70–71); Abidjan

Khady Diallo (born 1955) is an Ivory Coast Francophile and cultural engineer. She was associated with the first edition of "Le grand dictionnaire encyclopédique de la Côte d'Ivoire". She was the Ivorian cultural attaché in Paris and she was appointed the General Secretary of the National Commission of the Francophonie in Côte d'Ivoire in 2014.

== Life ==
Diallo was born in the capital of the Ivory Coast, Abidjan in 1955. She graduated in 1973 and became qualified in audiovisual production at the Société française de production in 1977. In 1979 she produced "I Love TV" for transmission on the Ivory Coast. The main presenter was Roger Fulgence Kassy.

In 1983 she oversaw with the creation of an encyclopaedic dictionary for the Ivory Coast which had been researched extensively by Raymond Borremans. This work was published in six volumes in 1986 after funding by New African Editions and the Ministry of Higher Education. The encyclopedia continued to further editions.

In 1996 she was involved in preparing the first programme to discuss AIDS on Ivorian television.

In 2010 she was responsible for "Fashion" at the World Festival of Black Arts in Dakar. She was the Ivorian cultural attaché in Paris in 2007 and she was appointed the General Secretary of the National Commission of the Francophonie in Côte d'Ivoire in 2014.

Diallo is an officer in the Ivorian l`ordre Cultural Merit.
