= List of Guineans =

This is a list of people from Guinea, a country in West Africa.

== A to C ==
- Alfa Yaya of Labé
- Ba Cissoko
- Abdallah Bah
- Almamy Schuman Bah
- Mamadou Bah
- Bobo Baldé
- Habib Baldé
- Sekouba Bambino
- Ibrahima Bangoura
- Ismaël Bangoura
- Ousmane Bangoura
- Sambégou Bangoura
- Louis Lansana Beavogui
- Bembeya Jazz National
- Edouard Benjamin
- Aboubacar M'Baye Camara
- Alhussein Camara
- Alsény Camara (footballer, born 1986)
- Alsény Camara (footballer, born 1995)
- Alsény Camara (footballer, born 1996)
- Arafan Camara
- Batouly Camara
- Eugène Camara
- Ibrahima Camara
- Abdoul Kabèlè Camara
- Kader Camara
- Kémoko Camara
- Mangué Camara
- Manimou Camara
- Mohammed Camara
- Mohamed Camara (film director)
- Ousmane N'Gom Camara
- Papa Camara
- Sekou Benna Camara
- Titi Camara
- Zeinab Camara
- Mohamed Cisse
- Alpha Condé
- Mamady Condé
- Aicha Nanette Conté
- Lansana Conté
- Sékou Kouréissy Condé
- Sona Tata Condé
- Ibrahima Sory Conte
- Victor Correia

== D to P ==
- Aissata Daffé
- Charlotte Daffé
- Alpha Yaya Diallo
- Mohamed Lamar Diallo
- Amadou Bailo Diallo
- Cellou Dalein Diallo
- Ibrahima Diallo
- Saifoulaye Diallo
- Kaba Diawara
- Sékou Oumar Drame
- François Lonseny Fall
- Pascal Feindouno
- Simon Feindouno
- Ibrahima Kassory Fofana
- El Hadj Ismael Mohamed Gassim Gushein
- Daouda Jabi
- Samuel Johnson (footballer, born 1984)
- Fatoumata Kaba
- Fatoumata Kaba (politician)
- Mamadi Kaba
- Oumar Kalabané
- Mory Kanté
- Solomana Kante
- Kassa (mansa)
- Abdoulaye Keita
- Alhassane Keita
- Mohamed Keita
- Mamady Keïta
- Naby Keïta
- Tidjan Keita (born 1996), French-Guinean basketball player in the Israeli Basketball Premier League
- Paulette Kourouma
- Lansana Kouyaté
- N'Faly Kouyate
- Mohamed Mancona Kouyaté
- Patricia Lamah
- Camara Laye
- Joseph Loua
- Fodé Mansaré
- Tierno Monénembo
- Djibril Tamsir Niane
- Souleymane Oularé
- Florentin Pogba
- Mathias Pogba

== S to Z ==
- Williams Sassine
- Jalloh Serima
- Odiah Sidibé
- Lamine Sidimé
- Aboubacar Somparé
- Chérif Souleymane
- Fodé Soumah
- Issiaga Soumah
- Abdoulaye Soumah
- Morlaye Soumah
- Abdoul Salam Sow
- Suleyman (mansa)
- Moussa Sy
- Abdoul Karim Sylla (footballer, born 1981)
- Abdoul Karim Sylla (footballer, born 1992)
- Abdoulaye Kapi Sylla
- Bengally Sylla
- Kanfory Sylla
- Kanfoury Sylla
- Mamadou Sylla (politician)
- Mariama Sylla (politician)
- Mohammed Sylla
- Diallo Telli
- Pablo Thiam
- Ahmed Sékou Touré
- Sidya Touré
- Boubacar Traore (runner)
- Diarra Traoré
- Elhadj Oumar Traoré
- Alseny Yansane
- Amadou Bah Oury
- Ibrahim Yattara
- Souleymane Youla
- Kamil Zayatte

== Others ==
- Ibrahim Sorie Turay AKA Istoure
- Diallo ElHadj Ourmar

== See also ==
- List of Guinean writers
- Lists of people by nationality
