= Trade unions in Guinea =

- National organization(s): UGTG, CNTG, ONSLG, USTG

International Labour Organization
- Guinea is a member of the ILO

Convention ratification
- Freedom of Association: 21 January 1959
- Right to Organise: 26 March 1959

Trade unions in Guinea were historically important - having played a pivotal role in the country's independence movement - and in recent years have again assumed a leading role.

== History ==
=== Colonial period ===
In 1945, Sekou Toure (later Guinea's first president) founded the first union in Guinea, organizing postal (PTT) workers, and then in 1946, the Territorial Union of Guinean Trade Unions (Union Territoriale des Syndicats de Guinée, UTSG).

Sekou Touré and Seydou Diallo (also of Guinea) were among the leaders in the creation of the French West African Confédération générale des travailleurs africains ('General Confederation of African Workers', CGTA) separate from the French union, Confédération Générale du Travail (CGT) in 1955-6.

=== Following independence ===
Trade unions were outlawed in 1961, following a teachers' strike, and legalized again in the 1990s.

In 2006, the unions (together) successfully organized strikes in Conakry, and in early 2007 led nationwide strikes that provoked a harsh government crackdown which resulted in over 100 fatalities.

In October 2009, following shooting and other violence against a political rally in Conakry, the unions organized a successful two-day strike.

== List ==
=== National centres ===
- Confédération Nationale des Travailleurs de Guinée (CNTG)
- Union syndicale des travailleurs de Guinée (USTG)
- Confédération Syndicale Autonome des Travailleurs et Retraités de Guinée (COSATREG)
- Confédération Générale des Travailleurs de Guinée (CGTG)
- Confédération Guinéenne des Syndicats Libres(CGSL)
- Union Démocratique des Travailleurs de Guinée (UDTG)
- Union Générale des Travailleurs de Guinée (UGTG)
- Confédération Générale des Forces Ouvrières de Guinée (CGFOG)
- Confédération Nationale des Syndicats Indépendants de Guinée (CONASIG)
- Union Nationale des Travailleurs de Guinée (UNTG)
- National Organization of Free Unions of Guinea(ONSLG)
- Syndicats des Pharmaciens d’Officines Privées de Guinées (SYPHOG)

=== Trade unions ===
- Syndicat des Acteurs de la Monnaie Électronique de Guinée (SAMEL-G)

=== Historical ===
- Confédération générale des travailleurs africains (CGTA)
