= Ahmed Tidiane Souaré =

Prime Minister of Guinea

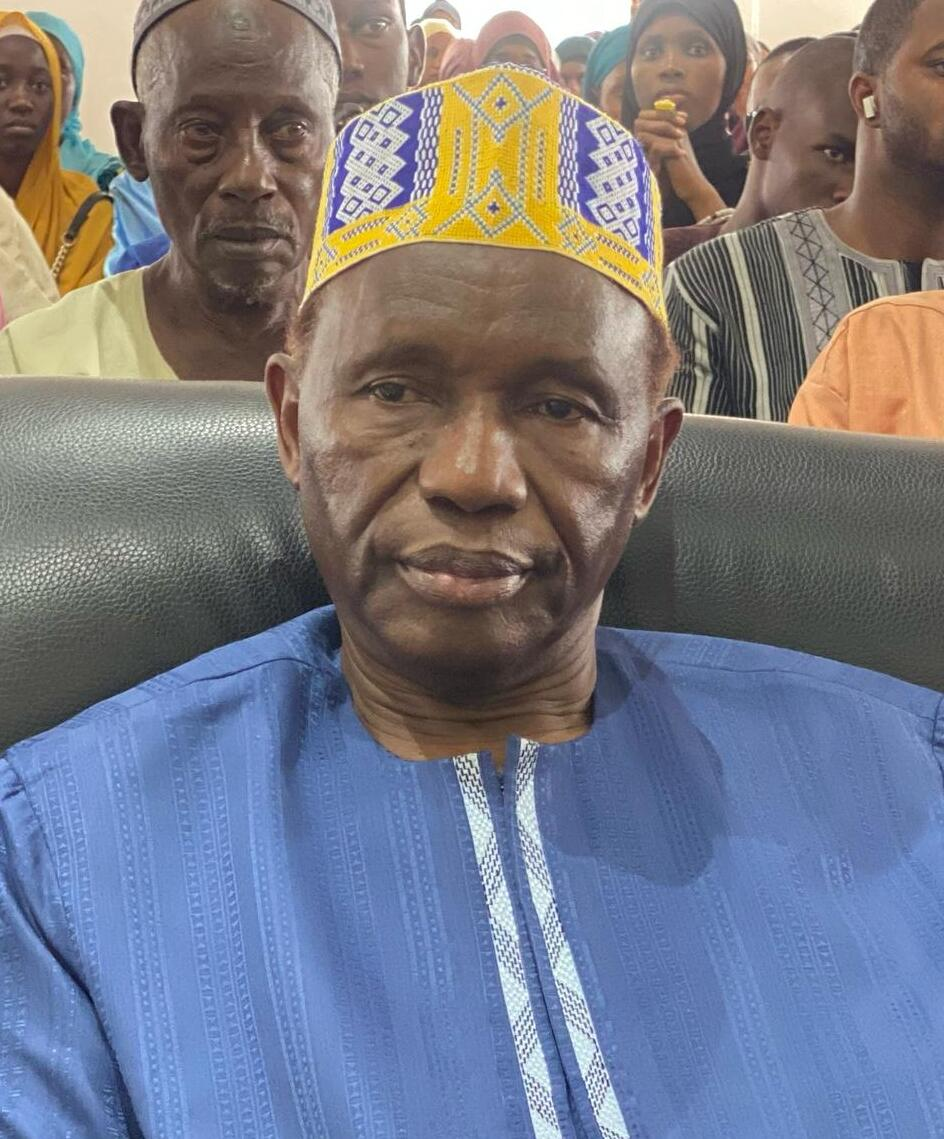

9th Prime Minister of Guinea
- In office 23 May 2008 – 24 December 2008
- President: Lansana Conté; Moussa Dadis Camara
- Preceded by: Lansana Kouyaté
- Succeeded by: Kabiné Komara

Personal details
- Born: 1951 (age 74–75)
- Party: Independent

Ahmed Tidiane Souaré (born 1951) is a Guinean political figure who was the Prime Minister of Guinea from May 2008 to December 2008, when he was replaced by Kabine Komara following a military coup d'état.

== Career in state administration and the government ==
From 1989 to 1990, Souaré was a member of the monitoring committee for the implementation of economic, financial and administrative reforms at the Presidency of the Republic. He was then coordinator of the office for monitoring, evaluation, and control at the Presidency of the Republic from 1990 to 1994; he was also president of the committee for the importation of petroleum products, rapporteur of the state commission for the liquidation of ONAH-ASP, and vice-president of the technical committee on re-evaluation of state immovable assets (COTERI) at the Presidency of the Republic.

Souaré was head of the cabinet of the Ministry of Economic and Financial Control in charge of the economic and financial coordination committee of the government from 1994 to 1996, then head of the cabinet of the Ministry Delegate to the Prime Minister in charge of budget and the restructuring of the parastatal sector from 1996 to 1997. Subsequently, from 1997 to 2002 he was head of the cabinet of the Ministry of Economy and Finance, as well as Administrator-General of SOTELGUI and vice-president of the interministerial committee monitoring the oil sector. He was appointed as Inspector-General of Finances on January 2, 2002; subsequently he headed the administrative council of OPG and was administrator of GUINOMAR.

Souaré was appointed to the government as Minister of Mines and Geology on March 8, 2005, and while serving in that position he was also appointed as Chairman of the Board of Directors of Compagnie des Bauxites de Guinée (CBG). He was subsequently moved to the post of Minister of State for Higher Education and Scientific Research on May 29, 2006 and served in that post until March 2007, when an entirely new government under Prime Minister Lansana Kouyaté was appointed. Souaré was also President of the Guinean National Commission for UNESCO.

In an audit made under Kouyaté into the government's financial management during the previous ten years, Souaré's name was included on a list of officials who were considered to be associated with the mismanagement of resources.

== As Prime Minister ==
In a decree read on state television on May 20, 2008, President Lansana Conté dismissed Kouyaté and appointed Souaré to replace him as Prime Minister. Souaré, a technocrat, was seen as being close to Conté, in contrast to Kouyaté, who had been appointed to appease striking trade unions in 2007 and had a difficult relationship with Conté, and Souaré's appointment was viewed as strengthening Conté's position. The opposition urged Souaré to invite the opposition to participate in his government, something that Kouyaté had not done.

Speaking at a news conference at his home on May 21, Souaré said that he intended to continue the changes initiated under Kouyaté and "bring reconciliation to Guineans"; he also said that he wanted "to restore authority to the state because we're in a state of disarray." Expressing surprise at his appointment, he said that he planned to improve social services and stressed the need to "reinforce unity in Guinea and restore people's confidence in government". Also on that day, Souaré met with Conté, who told him "to set to work and fulfil the needs of the population".

On May 22, Ibrahima Fofana, the leader of the United Trade Union of Guinean Workers, described Souaré's appointment as "a flagrant violation of the February 2007 agreement", which had led to the end of a general strike and the appointment of Kouyaté. He said that the groups involved in selecting the composition of Kouyaté's government had not been consulted about Souaré's appointment and that Souaré did "not fit the profile we agreed to in February 2007". According to Fofana, Souaré "re-appeared completely out of the blue", and he expressed surprise and dismay at Conté's selection of a Prime Minister from "the old guard". Unions also described Souaré as "incompetent", referring to his inclusion in the audit made under Kouyaté, and they claimed that the country's relations with international financial institutions had been "seriously compromise[d]" by Conté's appointment of Souaré. Despite this, the unions refrained from calling for a strike. They were believed by some to have been significantly weakened since they forced the appointment of Kouyaté through the 2007 strike.

Souaré was installed as Prime Minister at a ceremony in Conakry on May 23 by Sam Mamady Soumah, the Secretary-General of the Presidency of the Republic, in the absence of both Conté and Kouyaté. Speaking on this occasion, he said that he would "undertake large structural reforms, which will take into account the great changes within our society and in the world, but also the aspirations of the Guinean people".

Almost immediately, Souaré faced a crisis when violence erupted among soldiers demanding payment of wage arrears on May 26. During this violence, soldiers fired into the air, and General Mamadou Sampil, the deputy chief of staff of the army, was taken prisoner by the soldiers at the Alfa Yaya Diallo military base when he went to talk to them.

In response to the unrest, Souaré's government promised to pay the soldiers. Speaking on television on May 27, Souaré called for calm, noting that the government had agreed to meet most of the soldiers' demands. He said that up to five million Guinean francs would be paid to each soldier to account for wage arrears, which in some cases dated back to 1996; additionally, he assured the soldiers that they would not face punishment and said that soldiers who had been arrested in connection with 2007 unrest would be freed. Regarding the soldiers' demand that the price of rice be subsidized, he said that the government would try to improve the army's living conditions.

Despite Souaré's assurances, violence escalated on May 28, with soldiers engaging in looting in Conakry and continuing to fire into the air. The soldiers began receiving their backpay on May 30, and Conakry was reportedly calm by May 31.

Souaré met with representatives of political parties of both the presidential majority and the opposition on May 28 to discuss the formation of a national unity government. The opposition Union of Democratic Forces of Guinea (UFDG) and the Union for the Progress of Guinea (UPG) expressed their willingness to work with the government; however, another opposition party, the Rally of the Guinean People (RPG), chose not to attend the meeting. The RPG said that positive change would not come as long as Conté remained in power, regardless of who was Prime Minister, and it refused to participate in Souaré's government.

Souaré's government was appointed by Conté on June 19, 2008. The government, which included 34 ministers and two secretaries-general, had members of Conté's party, the Party of Unity and Progress (PUP), filling some key posts. It also included three opposition parties—the UFDG, the UPG, and the Union for Progress and Renewal (UPR)—each holding one position in the government. The RPG and the Union of Republican Forces (UFR) were not included. Ten members of Souaré's government had been members of Kouyaté's government. With 36 members, it was markedly larger than Kouyaté's 22-member government. Four women were included in Souaré's government.

Despite fears by some that Souaré's government would include many former ministers who had served in the government before Kouyaté took office, this did not occur, and the general reaction to the government's composition was reportedly positive.

In early July, Souaré toured Conakry and spoke to the people, promising to improve their situation with regard to food, water and electricity; he also said that his government would focus on reducing unemployment among young people. In early August, it was reported that Souaré planned to establish a Minimum Emergency Programme, which was designed to improve security, services, and youth employment, reduce food prices, and repair infrastructure. This programme was expected to cost about 75 billion Guinean francs.

=== December 2008 coup ===
In the early hours of 23 December 2008, Aboubacar Somparé, the President of the National Assembly, announced on television that Conté had died on the previous day "after a long illness." According to the Constitution, the President of the National Assembly was to assume the Presidency in the event of a vacancy, and a new presidential election was to be held within 60 days. Somparé requested that the President of the Supreme Court, Lamine Sidimé, declare a vacancy in the Presidency and apply the Constitution. Souaré and General Diarra Camara, the head of the army, stood alongside Somparé during his announcement. Declaring 40 days of national mourning for Conté, Souaré urged "calm and restraint". He told the army to secure the borders and maintain calm within the country "in homage to the memory of the illustrious late leader".

Six hours after Somparé announced Conté's death, a statement was read on state radio announcing a military coup d'état. This statement, read by Captain Moussa Dadis Camara on behalf of a group called the National Council for Democracy and Development (CNDD), said that "the government and the institutions of the Republic have been dissolved." The statement also announced the suspension of the constitution "as well as political and union activity." According to Captain Camara, the coup was necessary due to Guinea's "deep despair" amidst rampant poverty and corruption, and he said that the existing institutions were "incapable of resolving the crises which have been confronting the country."

Following Camara's announcement, Souaré said the government and state institutions were intact. According to Souaré, he did not know who was behind the coup attempt, but he said that he was "sure that they will see reason. They have not used force. There has been no threat against anybody." Somparé, meanwhile, called the coup attempt "a setback for our country" and expressed hope that it would not succeed. He argued that most soldiers were still loyal to the government.

The extent of the CNDD's control remained unclear on the next day, 24 December; although Souaré had gone into hiding, he insisted that the government had not been toppled. Souaré described Camara as "an unknown captain [who] doesn't control the army" and argued again that most troops were loyal, while attributing the "disorder" to "one little group".

Shortly after the CNDD ordered all members of the government and army officers to go to the Alpha Yaya Diallo military camp within 24 hours, with the threat of "a sweep of the entire national territory" if they did not, Souaré went to the camp and turned himself in on 25 December, together with all the members of his government except for two ministers who were, according to Souaré, on official missions abroad. Camara met with Souaré and stressed that the CNDD was now in power, but he said that Souaré and his government could "go back to business". During the meeting, Souaré expressed his government's willingness to serve under the CNDD, pointing out that his government was composed of technocrats, not politicians. He also addressed Camara as "President". Camara nevertheless appointed Kabine Komara, a technocrat working abroad, to replace Souaré on 30 December.

An interrogation of Souaré, along with three other former mining ministers, was broadcast on state television on the night of 7 March 2009. According to an official audit committee, the four of them were guilty of embezzlement during their tenures at the head of the Ministry of Mines and they collectively owed the government about 5.3 million in US dollars; Souaré was accused of stealing nearly half of the total. Speaking on the radio the next day, Souaré said that the allegedly misappropriated money had merely been used as a matter of necessity to fund the ministry's operations. Souaré was arrested on 23 March. He was later released, but on 30 June 2009 he was arrested again after failing to make sufficient repayments of the money (12 billion Guinean francs) that was allegedly stolen. He had been ordered to pay back the money in quarterly installments, but he said that he could not do so and only had 100 million of the three billion Guinean francs necessary for one quarterly payment. He was consequently arrested after going to a government office to pay the 100 million Guinean francs.

== See also ==
- Politics of Guinea

Political offices
Preceded by Lansana Kouyaté	Prime Minister of Guinea; 2008 – 2009	Succeeded by Kabiné Komara
