= Soumah =

Soumah is a surname. Notable people with the surname include:

- Abdoulaye Soumah (born 1985), Guinean footballer
- Alhassane Soumah (born 1996), Guinean footballer
- Amara Soumah (born 1990), Guinean footballer
- Fodé Soumah, Guinean politician
- Ibrahima Sory Soumah (born 1995), Guinean footballer
- Isseaga Soumah (born 1974), Guinean footballer
- M'mah Soumah (born 1985), Guinean judoka
- Mohamed Soumah (born 2003), Guinean footballer
- Momo Wandel Soumah (born 1926), Guinean singer, composer and saxophonist
- Morlaye Soumah (born 1971), Guinean footballer
- Naby Soumah (born 1985), Guinean footballer
- Ndèye Fatou Soumah (born 198), Senegalese sprinter
- Noël Soumah (born 1994), Senegalese footballer
- Richard Soumah (born 1986), Guinean footballer
- Seydouba Soumah (born 1991), Guinean footballer
- Soriba Soumah (1946–2004), Guinean footballer
