= Jean-Marie Doré =

20th and 21st-century Guinean Prime Minister

11th Prime Minister of Guinea
- In office 26 January 2010 – 24 December 2010
- President: Sékouba Konaté (Acting); Alpha Condé
- Preceded by: Kabiné Komara
- Succeeded by: Mohamed Said Fofana

Personal details
- Born: 12 June 1938 Guinée forestière, Guinea
- Died: 29 January 2016 (aged 77) Conakry, Guinea
- Party: Union for the Progress of Guinea

Jean-Marie Doré (12 June 1938 – 29 January 2016) was a Guinean politician who was the prime minister of Guinea from January 2010 until December 2010. Doré, who was the president of the Union for the Progress of Guinea (UPG), was an opposition leader for years before being chosen to head a transitional government that was in place during the preparation and conduct of the 2010 presidential election.

== Political career under Conté ==
A native of Bossou in Guinea's Forestière region, Doré received his higher education in France, where he studied law. He emerged as an important opposition leader in the early 1990s.

Doré, an intellectual known for his "fiery rhetoric and a sometimes outlandish persona", was a radical opponent and vitriolic critic of President Lansana Conté. Considered a "gadfly" on the political scene by some observers, Doré never participated in the government under Lansana Conté.

With his main support base among the minority ethnic groups of the Forestière region, Doré was a candidate in the 1993 presidential election; according to official results, he placed sixth with 0.9% of the vote. Subsequently he was elected to the National Assembly in the 1995 parliamentary election, winning a seat through national list proportional representation. He was the only UPG candidate to win a seat.

Doré ran again as the UPG candidate in the December 1998 presidential election. On 7 December 1998, shortly before the 1998 election was held, he called for it to be delayed due to inadequate preparations. After the election, he was placed under house arrest for a short period while votes were counted. The official results showed Doré placing fourth with 1.7% of the vote.

During the 1990s civil war in Liberia, Doré expressed friendship with Charles Taylor, the leader of one of Liberia's main armed factions. Following a UPG extraordinary congress, Doré held a press conference in late February 2001 in which he said that Conté and Taylor should act to facilitate peace by ceasing their mutual practice of giving shelter to the other's armed opponents. Doré called on Conté to disarm members of the anti-Taylor United Liberation Movement of Liberia for Democracy (ULIMO) who were in Guinea, saying that in doing so he would deny Taylor "a pretext for making trouble in Guinea".

Speaking in July 2001, Doré denounced the ruling party's campaign for a constitutional amendment that would allow President Conté to run for another term and threatened to withdraw the UPG from a national dialogue if the ruling party continued the campaign. He also stressed the importance of holding a new parliamentary election.

Although most of the opposition chose to boycott the June 2002 parliamentary election, the UPG participated and won three seats; Doré was among those elected. However, the UPG contested the official results of the election, which showed it winning three seats, and boycotted the National Assembly.

=== FRAD and the 2003 presidential election ===
In the run-up to the December 2003 presidential election, Doré was the spokesman of the Republican Front for Democratic Change (FRAD), which grouped seven opposition parties. FRAD boycotted a dialogue that the government attempted to initiate in July 2003; later, in September 2003, Interior Minister Moussa Solano said that opposition activities could be covered in the state media, but Doré, acting as FRAD spokesman, stressed that nothing less than a "signed statement by the authorities" would suffice, and he observed that the government had ignored opposition demands for the creation of a new and independent electoral commission. At a meeting between FRAD and the government on 29 September 2003, there were initially tensions between Doré and government supporters, but the government agreed to establish two commissions to review opposition demands and FRAD in turn agreed to participate in dialogue.

On 21 October 2003, the government refused to allow broadcast of a statement from FRAD that accused the government of planning fraud, and it also announced, without the opposition's agreement, that the election would be held on 21 December. Doré reacted to the two decisions with outrage, saying that the dialogue had been exposed as nothing but a pretense. Doré and the other major opposition leaders announced in early November 2003 that they would boycott the election.

In an interview with Radio France Internationale on 13 November 2003, Doré said that Conté's medical certificate, which cleared him to stand as a candidate despite his obviously failing health, was farcical. He also characterized the candidacy of Mamadou Bhoye Barry—a minor politician who was standing as Conté's only opponent in the election—as a calculated ploy, arguing that Barry was "planted by President Conté himself to show a semblance of democracy in the election." Doré was arrested later on the same day. Minister of Security Aboubacar Sampil spoke of putting him on trial for the offense of insulting the President, but he was quickly released, apparently due to pressure from the West, after 21 hours in detention. Doré struck a defiant tone upon his release from prison: "This will not cower me into submission ... as a matter of fact I am now determined more than before to see an end to the regime of Conté. The Conté of today is not the Conté of 10 years ago. He has lost his energy to govern." In an interview with IRIN, he said that he was held in "deplorable" conditions at a maximum security prison and that he "slept on an arm chair with [his] suit and shoes still on".

At a news conference on 18 November 2003, FRAD denounced Sampil for "turn[ing] this country into a police state" and demanded a delay in the election, vowing to disrupt it if it was held as planned in December. On the same occasion, Doré thanked his supporters for their show of solidarity. When Conté, who was easily re-elected, was sworn in for his new term on 19 January 2004, Doré said that it was "a sad day for Guinean politics", and he observed that several important regional leaders were not present for the occasion. Doré expressed satisfaction with Conté's decision to dismiss Moussa Solano from the government on 1 March 2004, saying that Solano was "the greatest obstacle to true democracy in this country".

=== Activities during Conté's last years (2005–2008) ===
As Conté's health was known to be failing, there was much speculation for years about what would happen upon his death. Doré stressed that the opposition parties needed to agree on a strategy for the post-Conté era. He also said that if the military took power after Conté's death, it would "not be able to last more than a few months, because it will get no financial backing from the international community and will not be able to meet people's basic needs". Later, on 10 September 2005, Doré read a statement on behalf of FRAD in which he described Conté as "an obstacle to Guinea's development" and urged him to resign: "You are not what the country needs. You are sick. You must make the wise decision to leave now before others make it for you." Doré announced on 29 October 2005 that FRAD would participate in the December 2005 municipal elections; while he stressed that "there are no guarantees of fair play", he said that FRAD would nevertheless "show the international community that we are committed to helping our country go forward".

When Conté went to Switzerland for medical treatment in March 2006, Doré again called attention to the state of Conté's health, saying that there was a legal requirement for the President to be sufficiently healthy to exercise his duties. He also said that the people deserved to know more about the situation and that "health bulletins should be published" to keep them informed. Later in 2006, amidst negotiations concerning a planned parliamentary election in 2007, Doré reiterated that negotiations between the government and opposition were ultimately futile if an independent electoral commission was not established.

Doré was alone among major opposition leaders in boycotting the March 2006 National Consultation, which proposed various reforms and a political transition. In January 2007, amidst a general strike backed by the opposition, Doré said that the people were outraged by Conté's "arrogant show of impunity" in releasing two of his friends from prison. He also emphasized that the people were "fed up with living in a country where nothing works even when there is not a general strike. People have nothing to lose."

== Events since 2008 ==
After nearly 25 years in power, Conté died on 23 December 2008. Speaking after the news was announced, Doré expressed sadness despite his opposition to Conté's policies. He stressed that "it is essential that the institutions function correctly and that the provisions of the constitution be respected" in the course of a peaceful transition. However, elements of the military seized power in a coup d'état within hours, establishing the National Council for Democracy and Development (CNDD) as the ruling junta. Together with other opposition parties, as well as civil society groups and trade unions, the UPG then formed the Forum of Active Forces (Forum des Forces Vives, FFV), an opposition coalition that sought a quick transition to elections and civilian rule. During that period, Doré played an important part in the opposition's talks with the CNDD and was spokesman of the FFV; he was considered particularly suitable for talks with the CNDD because he and CNDD President Moussa Dadis Camara were both native to the Forestière region. In contrast to his earlier rhetoric, it was observed that by that point he had adopted a more "level-headed" tone.

=== September 2009 violence ===
Acting on behalf of the FFV, Doré met with CNDD President Camara on 19 September 2009 to explain the FFV's plans to hold a "peaceful rally" on 28 September. The rally was intended to demonstrate opposition to Camara's purported plans to stand as a presidential candidate in the planned elections. Camara expressed concerns, but after Doré assured him that the rally would be held inside a stadium and there would be no "protest marches", he gave permission for the rally to be held. Later, on 27 September, the junta banned any demonstrations on 28 September; nevertheless, the FFV went forward with its plans, saying that it had received no official rejection of its request.

On the morning of 28 September, other opposition leaders met at Doré's home before leaving to participate in the demonstration. Doré remained at home because Camara had sent a group of religious leaders to his home with a message for the opposition leaders, attempting to persuade them to call off the demonstration. By the time Doré reached the 28 September Stadium for the demonstration, he was unable to enter it due to the number of people who had gathered; thus he was not present with the other opposition leaders on the stadium's podium and could not reach them to deliver Camara's message. From his position outside the stadium, Doré watched as the soldiers began to shoot the opposition supporters. According to Doré's account, he was then assaulted by five soldiers from the Presidential Guard, two of whom had been ULIMO fighters, and was nearly killed before Captain Moussa Tiégboro Camara, who was Minister at the Presidency for the Fight Against Drugs and Organized Crime, intervened:

"I know they were ULIMO because they talked about how they had been looking for me a long time, because I had opposed them in Liberia. They wore gris-gris around their necks. They were on drugs, and stank of alcohol. They demanded my cell phone, money, and jacket. Then they beat me on the head, hands, and shoulders. The two began to argue back and forth how they should kill me—one said, "Let's shoot him," and the other said, "No, let's cut his throat." They spoke to me in French, but it was bad French. What saved me is that at that moment the gendarme Tiégboro arrived. They were getting ready to kill me, those ULIMO, but I was saved by Tiégboro, who told them, "Leave Mr. Doré."

Doré, while continuing to endure beatings from members of the Presidential Guard, was taken to a car by Tiégboro and driven away, along with the other opposition leaders, who had also been beaten. They were first taken to a clinic, but then moved to the gendarme headquarters when another commander threatened to kill them at the clinic. After a few hours, Doré and the other opposition leaders were taken to another clinic on Camara's orders. In the evening, a government delegation went to the clinic, apologized to the opposition leaders, and told them they were free to leave.

Also on the evening of 28 September, while Doré was still at the clinic, his house was ransacked by soldiers, along with the homes of two other opposition leaders. Finding that Doré was not present, the soldiers looted the house of all its valuable possessions and vandalized it. Doré later said that he believed the attacks on the homes of the opposition leaders were intended "to kill us, ... to finish us off".

=== Transition ===
Camara was shot and wounded during a leadership dispute in December 2009, and Sékouba Konaté then took his place in an acting capacity. Konaté said that the opposition could choose a new Prime Minister to serve in the period leading up to a new election. On 15 January 2010, the FFV proposed two candidates for the post, Doré and the key union leader Rabiatou Serah Diallo, telling Konaté to choose between them. Konaté's spokesman said that Doré and Diallo would need to travel to Ouagadougou for talks with Konaté, the recovering Camara, and Burkinabé President Blaise Compaoré, who was acting as mediator. There was reportedly a split in the FFV regarding its choice, with political parties supporting Doré while the unions and civil society groups backed Diallo. Each candidate reportedly received 94 votes. Later, on 18 January, it was reported that the FFV had selected Doré as its sole candidate for the post of Prime Minister. The fact that Doré held a university degree was reportedly the deciding factor, although Diallo's union supporters were unhappy with the outcome.

On 19 January 2010, the junta announced its designation of Doré as Prime Minister, while citing "his experience [and] his knowledge of Guinean politics". He was to lead a 30-member government over the course of a six-month transitional period, which was to conclude with an election; Doré emphasized that the essential purpose of his government would be "to make the election a fair election". Doré's government was to be composed of ten ministers representing the opposition, ten representing the CNDD, and ten representing the various regions of Guinea.

Doré was officially appointed as Prime Minister on 21 January 2010. In the days that followed, two commissions—one representing the FFV and one representing the CNDD—were formed as part of negotiations between the two sides aimed at determining the composition of Doré's government. Doré officially took office as Prime Minister on 26 January 2010, succeeding Kabiné Komara. He said on the occasion that he was "committed to leading Guinea toward free, credible and transparent elections".

The process of determining the composition of the new government proved time-consuming, as the various political elements struggled to obtain ministerial posts. Doré consequently faced some criticism for not acting quickly enough. Some also expressed concern regarding the possibility that Doré might stand as a presidential candidate; his own statements on that possibility were unclear. Doré stressed that forming a government was difficult when he had to satisfy so many different elements and that it would "take some time". Speaking at a press conference on 2 February, he said that a rushed process would produce "an indigestible dish". He also explained that Konaté had told him to choose ministers who met "three criteria: competence, not being under international sanctions, and taking into account ethnic balance".

Doré's government, composed of 34 members, was eventually appointed on 15 February 2010. As planned, portfolios were allotted to members of both the CNDD and the FFV. The key junta officials Mamadou Toto Camara and Siba Lolamou notably retained their portfolios (security and justice, respectively).

After Alpha Condé won the presidential election in a controversial and hotly contested second round of voting, he took office as President of Guinea on 21 December 2010. Doré then presented his government's resignation to Condé, who accepted it on 22 December. Condé offered warm praise for Doré's government, saying that it had done an excellent job of paving the way for a free and fair election and facilitating a largely peaceful transfer of power.

In the September 2013 parliamentary election, Doré was elected to the National Assembly. As the oldest deputy (doyen d’âge) in the National Assembly, Doré presided over the election of the President of the National Assembly on 13 January 2014.

Doré died in the early hours of 29 January 2016 in Conakry from natural causes.

Political offices
Preceded by Kabiné Komara	Prime Minister of Guinea; 2010	Succeeded by Mohamed Said Fofana
