= Kabiné Komara =

Prime Minister of Guinea

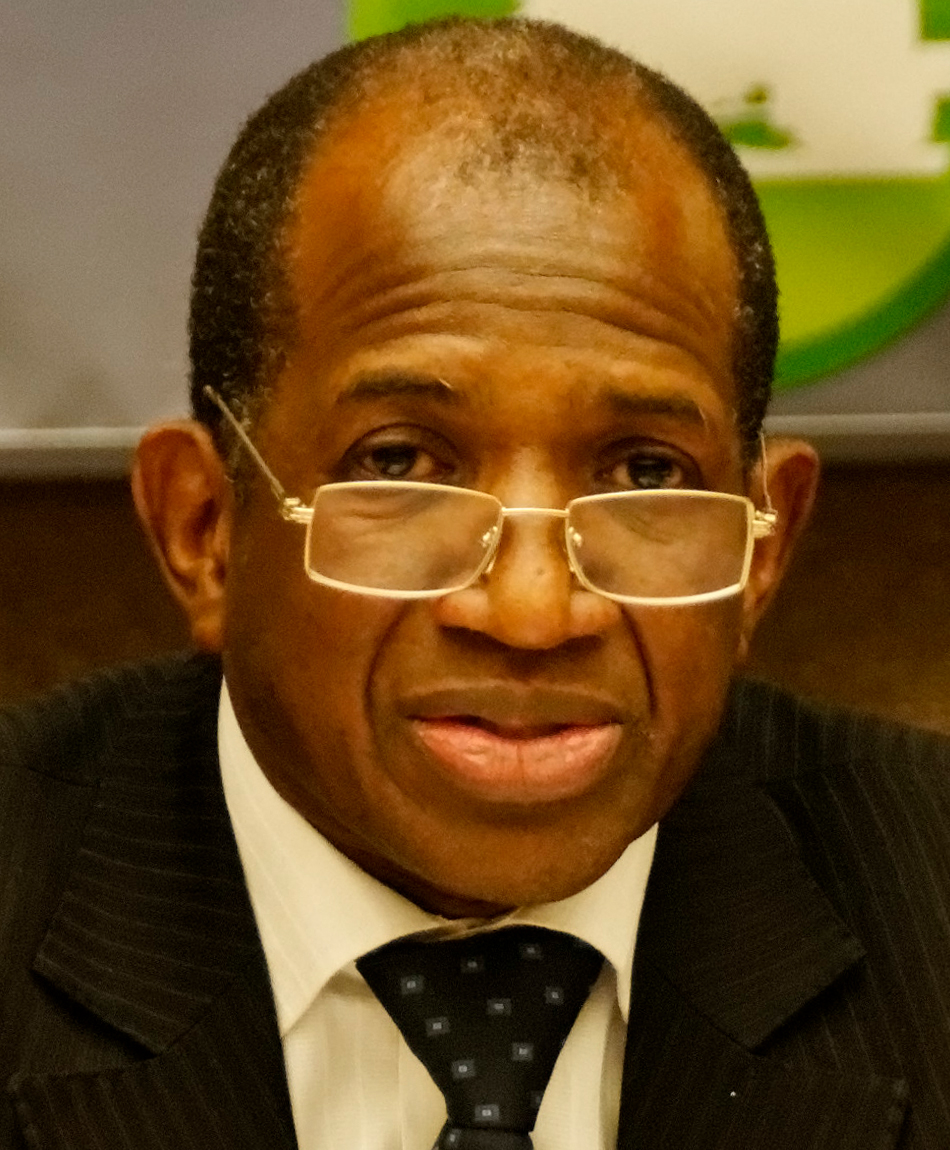
- Komara in 2011

10th Prime Minister of Guinea
- In office 30 December 2008 – 26 January 2010
- President: Moussa Dadis Camara; Sékouba Konaté (Acting)
- Preceded by: Ahmed Tidiane Souaré
- Succeeded by: Jean-Marie Doré

Personal details
- Born: 8 March 1950 (age 76)
- Party: Independent
- Education: HEC Paris; University of Colorado at Boulder; American University in Cairo

Kabiné Komara (born 8 March 1950) (his given name is also variously reported as Kabinet, Kabineh, Kabinè) was Prime Minister of Guinea from 30 December 2008 to 26 January 2010. Until the end of 2008 a director at the African Export-Import Bank in Cairo, Egypt, Komara was announced as the new prime minister in a government radio broadcast on 30 December.

== Career and personal life ==
Komara was born into a Maninka family from the interior area of Upper Guinea and pursued his education in the Guinean capital. In 1973, Komara received a Degree in Management from the école supérieure d'administration in Conakry. In later years he has studied at the Institut supérieur des affaires (ISA) Paris, at the University of Colorado at Boulder, and at the American University in Cairo. Komara began his banking career at Crédit Suisse, Zurich, in 1975. Rising in business and government, in 1990 he was appointed to the Guinean CTRN ruling council in charge of Economic Planning & Cooperation. He also served as Assistant Director for Personnel in the Compagnie des Bauxites de Guinée (CBG) and as director of the Alumina Company of Guinea (ACG-Fria) Aluminum works at Fria. Jeune Afrique reported that during that time he had fallen out with President Conté. From 1995 to 2008, he was Senior Director for Projects & Administrative Services at the African Export-Import Bank (Afreximbank) in Cairo, an organisation dedicated to improving trade between African nations. According to the African Press Agency, Komara is a married father of six.

== 2007 strikes ==
During the 2007 Guinean general strike, the opposition Trades Union leadership named Komara as one of four acceptable candidates to be appointed prime minister, a job later given to Lansana Kouyaté. While there is no indication he had campaigned for the post, he later published an open letter thanking the opposition. He was described at the time by the international press as an "apolitical technocrat".

== 2008 appointment ==
The National Council for Democracy and Development leadership under self-proclaimed President Camara had promised to choose a civilian prime minister in the week prior to Komara's appointment and after the 2008 Guinean coup d'état. A statement outlined the role of prime minister as:

In charge of controlling, coordinating and directing governmental action. He is responsible to the President for the proper functioning of government. With the President, the PM determines the membership of the government, who may also be named by ordnance. He presides over the Council of Ministers in place of the Head of State. The PM names civil service employees and directs government administration through authority delegated by the President of the Republic. The Prime Minister may represent the Head of State at sub-regional, regional, and international meetings. He is responsible for maintaining a political and social dialog."

Early in the morning of 30 December, government radio in Conakry read out a statement naming Komara as the new prime minister of Guinea. Kabiné Komara released a statement on the 30th accepting the post, after a special flight carried him from Cairo to Conakry, via Paris and Dakar.

Camara appointed a new government headed by Komara on 14 January 2009. The government was composed of soldiers and technocrats and did not include any political parties. It included 27 ministers and two secretaries of state.

Komara remained in office for about a year. Eventually, as part of a political transition, opposition leader Jean-Marie Doré was appointed to replace him; Doré took office on 26 January 2010, succeeding Komara.

== Coup d'etat of 2021 ==
In October 2021, Kabiné Komara supported the junta which carried out a coup d'état in Guinea.

Political offices
| Preceded by Ahmed Tidiane Souaré | Prime Minister of Guinea; 2009–2010 | Succeeded by Jean-Marie Doré |
