= Mamadouba Toto Camara =

Guinean politician (died 2021)

Minister of Security and Civil Protection
- In office 24 December 2010 – 15 January 2014
- President: Alpha Condé
- Succeeded by: Madifing Diané

Personal details
- Died: 23 August 2021
- Party: CNDD

Mamadouba Toto Camara (died 23 August 2021) was a Guinean politician. He served as Chief of Staff of the Republic of Guinea Armed Forces and was Minister of Security and Civil Protection following the 2008 Guinean coup d'état.

== Biography ==
Camara served as military attaché to the Embassy of Guinea, Washington, D.C. He then served as Vice-President of the National Council for Democracy and Development (CNDD), the militant group led by Moussa Dadis Camara who led the 2008 coup d'état. Weeks later, he was nominated to be Minister of Security and Civil Protection.

Camara was the CNDD's representative at the funeral of deposed President Lansana Conté on 26 December 2008. He then toured the neighboring countries of Mali, Guinea-Bissau, and Sierra Leone to seek support for the CNDD.

Mamadouba Toto Camara died on 23 August 2021 from COVID-19.
