= 2007 Guinean general strike =

2007 general strike in Guinea

- Date: January 10, 2007 - February 27, 2007

The 2007 Guinean general strike began on January 10, 2007. Guinea's trade unions and opposition parties called on President Lansana Conté to resign, accusing him of mismanaging the economy and abusing his authority. The strikers also accused Conté of personally securing the release of Mamadou Sylla and Fodé Soumah, both accused of corruption, from prison.

The strike ended on January 27 with an agreement between Conté and the unions, according to which Conté would appoint a new prime minister; however, Conté's choice of Eugène Camara as prime minister was deemed unacceptable by the unions, and the strike resumed on February 12. Martial law was imposed on the same day. Nearly two weeks later, Conté agreed to choose a prime minister acceptable to the unions, and on February 26 he named Lansana Kouyaté as prime minister. The strike ended on February 27, and Kouyaté was sworn in on March 1.

== Background ==
Two general strikes had been held in 2006, but these were limited to Conakry. The 2007 protests were first visible in Conakry, where workers stayed at home and businesses were shut. The government responded by threatening to sack striking civil servants. Youths took to the streets, despite a ban on rallies. Action soon spread to the nation's bauxite mines, where labourers stopped work. On January 16, Conté offered to cut fuel duty, raise teachers' salaries and address police corruption. This was rejected by union leaders, who were then arrested but soon released.

== January events ==
A general strike was called by the United Trade Union of Guinean Workers (the USTG) in an attempt to force the president to resign. Strike leaders said that Conté, who had ruled Guinea since seizing power in a 1984 coup, had become increasingly erratic. They cite repeated scares about his health, sudden and chaotic cabinet reshuffles and his recent personal intervention to free from jail two former allies accused of graft. The two main opposition parties in the nation, the Rally for the Guinean People and the Union of Republican Forces supported the strike, as did the National Council of Civil Society Organisations group of NGOs and the newly formed Civic Alliance.

Police were ordered to disperse crowds of protesters, numbering as many as 5,000, with tear gas. On January 17, two deaths from bullet wounds were reported in Conakry, and one in Labé. At least ten protesters had died by January 21. The biggest protest was called on January 22, with demonstrations in cities across the nation. In the ensuing battles between police and strikers, at least seventeen workers were killed. In Conakry, a crowd estimated at 30,000 marched on the National Assembly of Guinea, but were blocked at the 8 November Bridge, where the police allegedly opened fire.

On January 23, the three most prominent trade unionists were arrested by Presidential troops: Rabiatou Sérah Diallo of the National Confederation of Guinean Workers, Ibrahima Fofana of the United Trade Union of Guinean Workers and Yamadou Touré of the National Organization of Free Unions of Guinea. They claimed to have received death threats from various sources, including Conté himself. Troops then ransacked the Labour Exchange, headquarters of many of the unions. Fofana and Diallo were both injured, but all arrested unionist were released by the following day.

On January 24, Conté met with union leaders, members of Guinea's Supreme Court and religious leaders. Conté is said to have agreed to appoint a new prime minister to end the strike, but strike leaders vowed to continue until all their demands would be met, which include the resignation of Conté. He later conceded to reform the country's political system into a semi-presidential one, which had been the unions' compromise demand. Union leaders stated that there were still more issues to be resolved, but that they were hopeful they could come to an agreement. Conté also agreed to lower the prices of fuel and rice, and on January 27, Fofana announced the end of the strike.

On January 31, 2007, Conté announced the powers the new prime minister would have: He would be the head of government, be allowed to propose his own team of ministers, organise the country's civil administration and be allowed to represent the president at international meetings. Conté did not yet announce who would become the new prime minister.

== Appointment of Eugène Camara ==
On February 6, 2007, the unions issued an ultimatum, saying that the strike would resume unless Conté appointed a prime minister by February 12. On February 9, Conté nominated Eugène Camara, the minister of state for presidential affairs, as prime minister. Camara is considered a close associate of Conté.

Camara's appointment was rejected by the opposition. In the day after his appointment, violence broke out in Conakry and several other parts of the country, and at least eight people were reportedly killed. At least one person was reportedly killed by security forces when protesters threw rocks at a car in which Conté was said to be travelling. Looting was reported, and a soldier who had shot protesters was reportedly killed and set on fire in Kankan. Union leader Ibrahim Fofana and opposition leader Ba Mamadou said that Conté must step down.

In a statement given to BBC on February 11, USTG leader Ibrahima Fofana declared that the unions now demanded the dismissal of the entire government, including the president.

== Resumption of strike and martial law ==
The strike resumed on February 12, with demonstrations across the nation and the military out in force. Conté declared martial law on the same day, which he said would remain in effect until February 23. On February 13, with a curfew in force for all but four hours of the day (4 to 8 pm), Conakry was reported to be largely under control, although some gunfire was still heard in the city. Army chief of staff Gen. Kerfala Camara announced late in the same day that the curfew hours would be changed so that the period from noon to 6 pm would be exempt from curfew. Gen. Camara said on February 16 that martial law would continue until the unions agreed to call off the strike, but the unions have refused to enter talks until martial law is lifted. On February 18, Gen. Camara said that the curfew would be reduced further so that it would cover the period from 6 pm to 6 am, thus adding six hours to the portion of the day exempt from it, beginning on February 19. On February 19, negotiation resumed between Government representative and Unions through religious leaders. However, the Union have said they will not participate to current negotiation until the martial law is lifted. On Friday afternoon at the Palais du Peuple, Guineenews reported that Abdoulaye Bah, the General Secretary of one of the Union (the UTDG) said the meeting has been postponed as they religious leadership is briefing the government and the army about the meeting they had with the Union the day before.

A proposal to leave Eugène Camara in office as prime minister for three months as a trial period was rejected by the unions on February 20. On February 22, Conté requested that parliament approve an extension of martial law, but on the next day parliament unanimously rejected the request. Gen. Kerfala Camara then ordered that people resume work on February 26, and that classes resume on March 1. The unions said that the strike would continue. Shortly afterward, however, Conté agreed to appoint a new prime minister from a list of individuals chosen by the unions and representatives of civil society. He chose Lansana Kouyaté as the new prime minister on February 26, and union leaders declared an end to the strike. Following a day of commemoration services for the 110 victims of the struggle, people returned to work on February 27. Opposition spokesperson Mamadou Ba warned that it would be necessary to keep up the pressure on Conté to ensure that he permitted Kouyaté to do his job.

Kouyaté was sworn in as prime minister on March 1; Conté did not attend the ceremony, which was instead presided over by Eugène Camara. School classes resumed on the same day.

== Media censorship ==
During January, strikers were banned from television and all but one radio station. Many coordinated their activity through SMS messages. Rumours spread that the state-owned network Sotelgui were deliberately blocking texts.

After martial law was declared on February 12, almost all media ceased to appear. Radio stations including Familia FM and Liberté FM were forcibly closed; the only station permitted to remain on air was music-only Nostalgie FM. Radiodiffusion Télévision Guinéenne restricted its broadcasting to governmental and army statements. All internet cafés were ordered to shut, and all four of the nation's Internet service providers were taken offline. Newspapers were only permitted to publish if their content was approved by military commanders. In the event, most chose not to appear, and many outlets refused to sell those that did.

== Fears of civil war ==
The International Crisis Group believes that the crisis in Guinea could lead to civil war in Guinea and to deteriorating political stability in neighboring Liberia, Sierra Leone and Côte d'Ivoire, and Guinea-Bissau. According to Guinean government officials and Security Minister Moussa Solano on Guinean TV "foreign interests in the oil and mine sector are fostering the troubles" in Guinea.

On February 20, Conté met with Liberian President Ellen Johnson Sirleaf and Sierra Leonean President Ahmad Tejan Kabbah amid concerns about the potential for regional destabilization.
