= Sékou Condé =

Sékou Condé may refer to:

- Sékou Condé (footballer, born 1943), Guinean former footballer
- Sékou Condé (footballer, born 1993), Guinean footballer
- Sékou Kouréissy Condé (born 1954), Guinean politician
