= Moussa Dadis Camara =

President of Guinea from 2008 to 2010

Captain Moussa Dadis Camara
- ߡߎߛߊ߫ ߘߊ߬ߘߌߛ ߞߡߊ߬ߙߊ߫ ߫
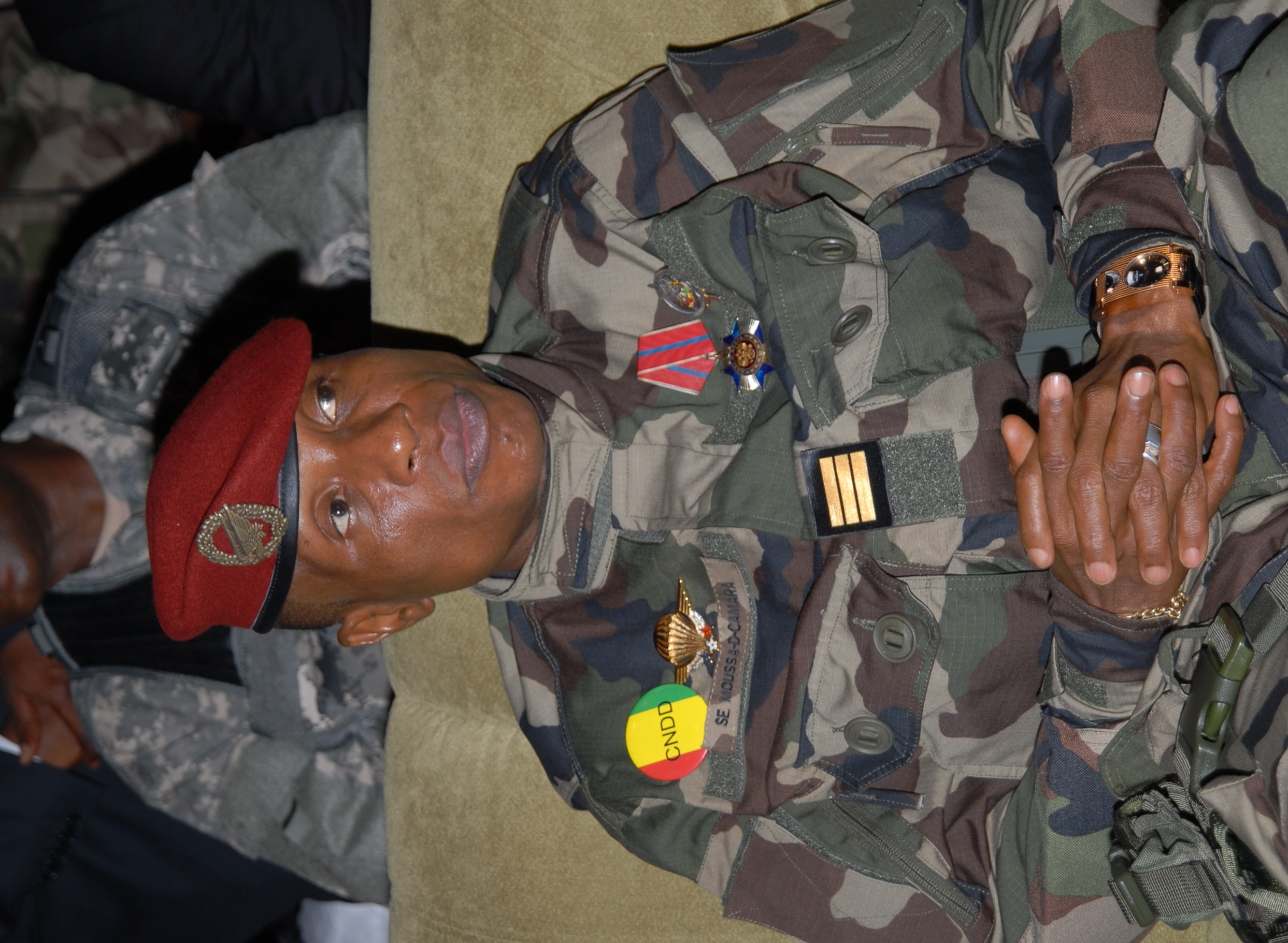
- Camara in 2009

3rd President of Guinea
- In office 23 December 2008 – 3 December 2009
- Prime Minister: Kabiné Komara
- Preceded by: Lansana Conté
- Succeeded by: Sékouba Konaté (acting); Alpha Condé

1st Chairman of the National Council for Democracy and Development
- In office 23 December 2008 – 3 December 2009
- Vice President: Sékouba Konaté
- Preceded by: Council formed
- Succeeded by: Sékouba Konaté (acting)

Personal details
- Born: 1 January 1964 (age 62) Koulé, Guinea
- Party: None
- Spouse: Jeanne Saba
- Children: 4
- Education: University of Conakry
- Profession: Soldier
- Website: Official website

Military service
- Allegiance: Guinea
- Branch/service: Guinean Army
- Years of service: 1983–2010
- Rank: Captain
- Battles/wars: 2008 Guinean military unrest; United Nations Mission in Sierra Leone; Sierra Leone Civil War
- Criminal information
- Status: Incarcerated at the Maison Centrale de Conakry
- Conviction: Crimes against humanity
- Penalty: 20 years of imprisonment

Details
- Date apprehended: 27 September 2022

Captain Moussa Dadis Camara (French pronunciation: [musa dadis kamaʁa]; N'Ko: ߡߎߛߊ߫ ߘߊ߬ߘߌߛ ߞߡߊ߬ߙߊ߫ ߫; born 1 January 1964), now called Moïse Dadis Camara ([mɔiz dadis kamaʁa]), is an ex-officer of the Guinean Army who served as the third president of Guinea from 23 December 2008 to 3 December 2009. He was the first chairman of the National Council for Democracy and Development, which seized power in a military coup d'état on 23 December 2008 shortly after the death of long-time president Lansana Conté.

On 28 September 2009, protests occurred in the capital Conakry demanding that Camara step down. The security forces responded with force, and several dozen people died. On 3 December 2009, Camara was shot in the head during an assassination attempt and subsequently left the country to Morocco for medical treatment. Sékouba Konaté took over as acting president, with the United States and France expressing their desire to keep Camara out of the country. He was exiled in Burkina Faso, where he converted from Islam to Catholicism, changing his name from Moussa to the French form, Moïse, before returning to Guinea in 2021. On 31 July 2024, he was found guilty of crimes against humanity for his role in the 2009 protests, and was sentenced to 20 years' imprisonment.

On March 28, 2025, he was pardoned by the transitional president, Mamady Doumbouya.

== Early and personal life ==
Moussa Dadis Camara was born in 1964 in the remote town of Koulé, Nzérékoré Prefecture, in the Guinée Forestière region of southeastern Guinea, near the border with Côte d'Ivoire and Liberia. He is a member of the Kpelle ethnic group (known in Guinea as Guerze). Dadis attended primary and secondary school in Nzérékoré, about 40 kilometres (25 mi) away from his birth-town of Koulé. He studied law and economics at Abdel Nasser University in the capital, Conakry.

He joined the Army of Guinea in 1990 as a corporal and was later appointed the Chief of Fuels at the Guinean army base in Kindia, about 100 kilometres (60 mi) northeast of Conakry. From 2001 to 2002, Dadis was sent to Sierra Leone as a member of the United Nations' peacekeeping troops. In 2004, President Conté sent Dadis, along with several other Guinean soldiers, to Bremen, Germany, for 18 months’ military training. In November 2008, he was named head of the Guinean army's fuel supplies unit, a branch of the Guinean Minister of Defense's cabinet. He was one of the leading mutineers in the 2008 Guinean military unrest. Prior to the December 2008 coup, he was not well known by the general population.

In 2010, Camara converted from Islam to Roman Catholicism. Dadis speaks five languages: French, Kpelle, Susu, Maninka and German.

== Christmas coup ==
In the early hours of 23 December 2008, Aboubacar Somparé, the President of the National Assembly, announced on television that Conté had died because of illness on 22 December. According to the constitution, the President of the National Assembly was to assume the Presidency of the Republic in the event of a vacancy, and a new presidential election was to be held within 60 days.

Six hours after Somparé announced Conté's death, a statement was read on television announcing a military coup d'état. This statement, read by Captain Camara on behalf of the CNDD, said that "the government and the institutions of the Republic have been dissolved". The statement also announced the suspension of the constitution "as well as political and union activity". Guinean national radio began playing the song "Armée Guinéenne" repeatedly. According to Camara, the coup was necessary because of Guinea's "deep despair" amidst rampant poverty and corruption, and he said that the existing institutions were "incapable of resolving the crises which have been confronting the country." Furthermore, Camara said that someone from the military would become president, while a civilian would be appointed prime minister at the head of a new government that would be ethnically balanced. The National Council for Democracy and Development would, according to Camara, include 26 officers as well as six civilians.

A statement was read over the radio on 24 December 2008, announcing that Captain Camara was the President of the CNDD. Later in the day, Camara and thousands of soldiers loyal to him paraded through the city, surrounded by large numbers of civilian supporters. According to Camara, he "came to see if the terrain is favorable to us", declaring that the large crowds indicated that the people were indeed supportive of the coup. Also on 24 December, Camara said in a radio broadcast that the CNDD did not want to stay in power indefinitely and that it intended to lead the country for two years, promising "credible and transparent presidential elections by the end of December 2010". This contradicted an earlier statement which promised an election within the constitutionally mandated period of 60 days.

Speaking on the radio on 25 December, Camara said that he did not plan to run for president at the end of the two-year transitional period. He also declared that the CNDD was not susceptible to bribes. According to Camara, people had "start[ed] to show up with bags of money to try to corrupt us. They’ve tried to give money to our wives and cars to our children." He warned that he would "personally go after anyone that tries to corrupt us".

The Associated Press reported that Camara's tenureship was quickly challenged by soldiers of Sekouba Konate, in one of the capital's barracks. Camara, Konate, and a third unknown officer then drew lots, twice, to determine who would lead, with Camara winning both times.

On 25 December 2008, the Prime Minister under the previous régime, Ahmed Tidiane Souaré, pledged loyalty to Camara, thus further consolidating the latter's rule. On 22 March 2009, Souaré was arrested and held in a military prison, along with two Mines Ministers (recalling that Guinea is the world's largest exporter of bauxite, the necessary ore for aluminum).

== 28 September events ==
On 28 September 2009, opposition party members demonstrated in the Stade du 28 Septembre in Conakry, demanding that Camara step down. Although many branches of security forces were involved, the presidential guard "Red Berets", led by Abubakar "Toumba" Diakite, were responsible for the violence, firing on, knifing, bayonetting, and gang-raping the fleeing civilians, killing at least 157 people (U.N.) and injuring at least 1,200 not just in the stadium but as many fled on streets. In response to criticism from international human rights organisations, the government has said that only 56 people died and most were trampled by fleeing protesters. Following the event, cell phone photos from anonymous sources circulated on the Internet, showing what appears to be many women being raped by Camara's soldiers. Few women have spoken up about the attacks against them because of a societal stigma against the victims of sexual assault. However, Médecins Sans Frontières has confirmed that they have treated several rape and sexual violence victims of the incident. For a people already accustomed to violence, the rapes were nonetheless especially shocking as they took place in the open space, under broad daylight, and were horrifically violent and often mortal. According to numerous witness accounts, women were horrendously gang-raped using gun barrels and other objects. Some were raped then shot with the rifle barrel in their vaginas. The International Criminal Court is currently investigating the incident and the African Union asked for Camara's resignation.

In response to the incident, the Economic Community of West African States imposed an arms embargo on Guinea. The African Union, the European Union and the United States punished Moussa Dadis Camara and forty-one other junta members in late October 2009. The African Union imposed a travel ban and froze any bank accounts owned by the forty-two. The European Union did the same a day earlier. The United States opted for a travel ban alone. The African Union's commissioner for peace and security said the sanctions were intended to punish the junta and would not affect areas such as trade which may impact on the lives of ordinary citizens.

== Assassination attempt ==
On 3 December 2009, Camara was shot by men under the command of his aide-de-camp, Abubakar "Toumba" Diakite. A government spokesman (Idrissa Cherif) said he was only lightly wounded, but anonymous junta officials said Camara was in a serious condition after being shot in the head. Camara's bodyguard and driver were killed in the attack.

On 4 December, sources told The New York Times that Camara had in fact left the country for medical treatment in Morocco, amidst claims by officials that he was not in serious condition.

Vice-president (and defense minister) Sékouba Konaté flew back from Lebanon to run the country. With Camara still in rehabilitation, the United States government expressed its desire to see Camara kept out of Guinea. Konaté was appointed head of the Transition regime tasked with the preparation of the 2010 presidential election, because: "All of Camara’s actions were ill concealed attempts to take over… we’re not getting that same sense from Konate," according to the United States Deputy Secretary of State William Fitzgerald.

On 16 December 2009, Diakite was still in hiding.

On 17 December 2009, a United States diplomatic agent sent information that Camara's health was "not expected to return fully to [its] previous state" following the assassination attempt. Possible plans for restoring order were discussed.

== Exile ==
On 12 January 2010, Camara was flown to Burkina Faso. After meeting in Ouagadougou on 13 and 14 January, on 15 January, Camara, Konaté and Blaise Compaoré, former President of Burkina Faso, produced a formal statement of twelve principles promising a return of Guinea to civilian rule within six months. It was agreed that the military would not contest the forthcoming elections, and Camara would continue his recovery outside Guinea. On 21 January 2010 the military junta appointed Jean-Marie Doré as Prime Minister of a six-month transition government, leading up to elections.

Moussa lived in exile in Ouagadougou. During this time he converted from Islam to Catholicism, changing his birth name of "Moussa" (Moses) to its French form, "Moïse". In October 2016, Camara retired from the presidency of his party, the Patriotic Forces for Democracy and Development (FPDD) and announced that he would not participate in the next municipal and legislative elections. He briefly returned to Guinea in 2013, crossing the land border from Liberia to attend his mother's funeral. Another visit was thwarted in 2015 after President Alpha Conde forced him to deplane a commercial flight during a stopover in Côte d'Ivoire. On 22 December 2021, Camara returned to Guinea.

== Trial and imprisonment ==
On 27 September 2022, Camara was imprisoned and tried for the 2009 massacre. Salifou Beavogui, one of Camara's lawyers, stated that the prosecutor had "take our six clients to the central house (prison) where they will apparently be confined until the end (of the trial)" and that "Very unfortunately, the trial is beginning with the violation of the rights of the accused". On 28 September, Camara and 10 other former military and government officials appeared in court.

On 4 November 2023, a heavily armed group broke Camara and three other officials out of the Conakry jail. During his escape, nine people, including three intruders and four members of Guinea’s defense forces were killed, and six others were treated for gunshot wounds. He was recaptured hours later. On 13 November, his trial resumed, having been suspended for three weeks due to unrelated reasons.

On 31 July 2024, Moussa Dadis Camara was found guilty of “crimes against humanity” in the massacres that occurred in 2009, and was sentenced to twenty years in prison. On 28 March 2025, he was pardoned by president Mamady Doumbouya, and left the country the following month for medical reasons.

== See also ==
- Politics of Guinea

Political offices
Preceded by Lansana Conté	President of Guinea; 2008–2009	Succeeded by Sékouba Konaté; Acting
