= 2008 Guinean military unrest =

Military unrest occurred in Guinea in late May 2008 as soldiers of the Military of Guinea demanded wage arrears. In the capital, Conakry, soldiers fired into the air, held the deputy chief of staff of the army prisoner, and engaged in looting. The government promised to pay the soldiers, and by the end of May the situation was reportedly calm.

On May 20, 2008, President Lansana Conté dismissed Prime Minister Lansana Kouyaté and replaced him with Ahmed Tidiane Souaré. Soldiers who were dissatisfied over their failure to receive wage arrears that in some cases dated back to 1996 were unhappy with Kouyaté's dismissal, feeling that without Kouyaté they had no one to whom they could address their grievances.

The unrest began with gunfire at the Alfa Yaya Diallo barracks in Conakry early on May 26. During this unrest, the soldiers fired into the air and demanded payment of their wage arrears; General Mamadou Sampil, the deputy chief of staff of the army, was taken prisoner by the soldiers at the Alfa Yaya Diallo barracks when he went to talk to them. Eight people were reported injured and one was reported killed on May 26. Among the injured were Major Korka Diallo, the officer in charge of military finances, and two other officers; these three officers were flown to Morocco for medical treatment.

In response to the unrest, Souaré's government promised to pay the soldiers, and Minister of Defense Mamadou Bailo Diallo was dismissed by Conté. Speaking on television on May 27, Souaré called for calm, noting that the government had agreed to meet most of the soldiers' demands. He said that up to five million Guinean francs would be paid to each soldier to account for the wage arrears; additionally, he assured the soldiers that they would not face punishment and said that soldiers who had been arrested in connection with 2007 unrest would be freed. Regarding the soldiers' demand that the price of rice be subsidized, he said that the government would try to improve the army's living conditions. Souaré also said that a commission, including both civilians and members of the military, had been set up at the beginning of the crisis to review the soldiers' demands. He said that "stability and social peace in the country depend mainly on order and discipline within our national armed forces".

Despite Souaré's assurances, violence escalated on May 28, with soldiers engaging in looting in Conakry and continuing to fire into the air; at least 20 injuries were reported. Late on May 28 they entered the airport in Conakry, firing into the air and forcing a recently arrived cargo plane to depart without unloading its cargo; the soldiers deemed this cargo plane to be suspicious. Due to the disruption, the airport was closed and incoming flights were diverted; among these was an Air France flight carrying the Guinea national football team. Instead, the flight landed in Dakar.

On May 29, it was reported that the soldiers had increased their demands to include the dismissal of all officers above the rank of colonel; on the same day, during an exchange of gunfire between presidential guards and mutinous soldiers at the November 8 Bridge, two presidential guards were reportedly injured. The home of dismissed Defense Minister Mamadou Bailo Diallo in Dubreka, near Conakry, was reportedly destroyed; also, the home of Mougne Donzo, the Commander of the Presidential Security Battalion, in Koloma District was reportedly ransacked.

Early on May 30, supporters of Conté held a demonstration at the Palace of the People in Conakry, condemning the unrest. The soldiers began receiving their back pay on May 30, as initial payments of one million Guinean francs were distributed; subsequently, Conakry was reported calm, but on May 30 most markets, shops, offices, and gas stations remained closed. On the same day, Conté met with the mutinous soldiers at the Samory Touré camp.

The National Council of Guinean Civil Society Organizations (CNOSCG) condemned violence against civilians and called for an unconditional end to gunfire in a statement on May 31. Life in Conakry returned to normal by June 1, as gas stations reopened, black market gas prices fell substantially, transport fares were brought down to the normal level, and the normal flow of traffic in the city resumed. Calm was also reported in Kindia and Nzérékoré.

Conté again met with leaders of the mutinous soldiers on June 1 at the Samory Touré camp; he reportedly asked them to return to their barracks while he considered their demands. They reportedly dropped their demand that the highest-ranking officers be dismissed, which was their most radical demand.

On June 16, police officers began a strike to demand payment of their own wage arrears; they also wanted higher pay and a larger subsidy for rice, and to press their demands, they fired into the air and took some senior officers hostage, although the hostages were quickly released. It was suggested by some that the police, having witnessed the soldiers' successful pursuit of their wage arrears, were thus encouraged to take a similar course.

Soldiers from the Alpha Yaya Diallo base responded to the police strike by attacking the Anti-Riot Squad (CMIS) police base in Conakry early on June 17, ransacking and looting it. In gunfire exchanged between soldiers and the police on this occasion, two police officers and one civilian were reportedly killed.

== See also ==
- 2008 Guinean coup d'état
