= Togba Zogbélémou =

Guinean politician (died 2026)

Minister of Justice of Guinea
- In office 10 July 1996 – 7 June 2000
- President: Lansana Conté

Member of the National Assembly of Guinea
- In office 14 January 2014 – 5 September 2021

Personal details
- Born: Maurice Togba Zogbélémou
- Died: 15 June 2026 Conakry, Guinea
- Party: RPG

Maurice Togba Zogbélémou (died 15 June 2026) was a Guinean politician. A member of the Rally of the Guinean People, he served as minister of justice of Guinea from 1996 to 2000 and in the National Assembly of Guinea from 2014 to 2021.

Zogbélémou died in Conakry on 15 June 2026.
