= Military ranks of Guinea =

The Military ranks of Guinea are the military insignia used by the Republic of Guinea Armed Forces. Being a former colony of France, Guinea shares a rank structure similar to that of France.

== Commissioned officer ranks ==
The rank insignia of commissioned officers.

Rank group	General / flag officers				Senior officers			Junior officers
Guinea Ground Forces
Guinea Ground Forces	Général d'armée	Général de corps d'armée	Général de division	Général de brigade	Colonel	Lieutenant-colonel	Commandant	Capitaine	Lieutenant	Sous-lieutenant
Guinean Navy
Guinean Navy	Amiral de la Flotte	Vice-amiral d'escadre	Vice-amiral	Contre-amiral	Capitaine de vaisseau	Capitaine de frégate	Capitaine de corvette	Lieutenant de vaisseau	Enseigne de vaisseau de 1^{re} classe	Enseigne de vaisseau de 2^{e} classe
Guinea Air Force
Guinea Air Force	Général d'armée	Général de corps d'armée	Général de division	Général de brigade	Colonel	Lieutenant-colonel	Commandant	Capitaine	Lieutenant	Sous-lieutenant
Rank group	General / flag officers				Senior officers			Junior officers

== Other ranks ==
The rank insignia of non-commissioned officers and enlisted personnel.

Rank group	Senior NCOs					Junior NCOs		Enlisted
Guinea Ground Forces
Guinea Ground Forces	Major	Adjudant-chef	Adjudant	Sergent-chef	Sergent	Caporal-chef	Caporal	Soldat de 1^{ère} classe	Soldat de 2^{ème} classe
Guinean Navy
Guinean Navy	Major	Maître principal	Premier maître	Maître	Second-maître	Quartier-maître de 1^{ère} classe	Quartier-maître de 2^{ème} classe	Matelot breveté	Matelot
Guinea Air Force
Guinea Air Force	Major	Adjudant-chef	Adjudant	Sergent-chef	Sergent	Caporal-chef	Caporal	Soldat de 1^{ère} classe	Soldat de 2^{ème} classe
Rank group	Senior NCOs					Junior NCOs		Enlisted
