= Ibrahima Fofana (trade unionist) =

Guinean trade unionist (1952–2010)

Ibrahima Fofana (12 January 1952 – 16 April 2010) was a Guinean trade unionist.

Fofana was elected as the leader of the United Trade Union of Guinean Workers by 1995. He played a key role in the January–February 2007 general strike, during which he was injured. He announced the end of the first stage of the strike in a live television broadcast in late January.

Fofana was killed in a car accident en route to Fria in 2010.
