= List of ministers of justice of Guinea =

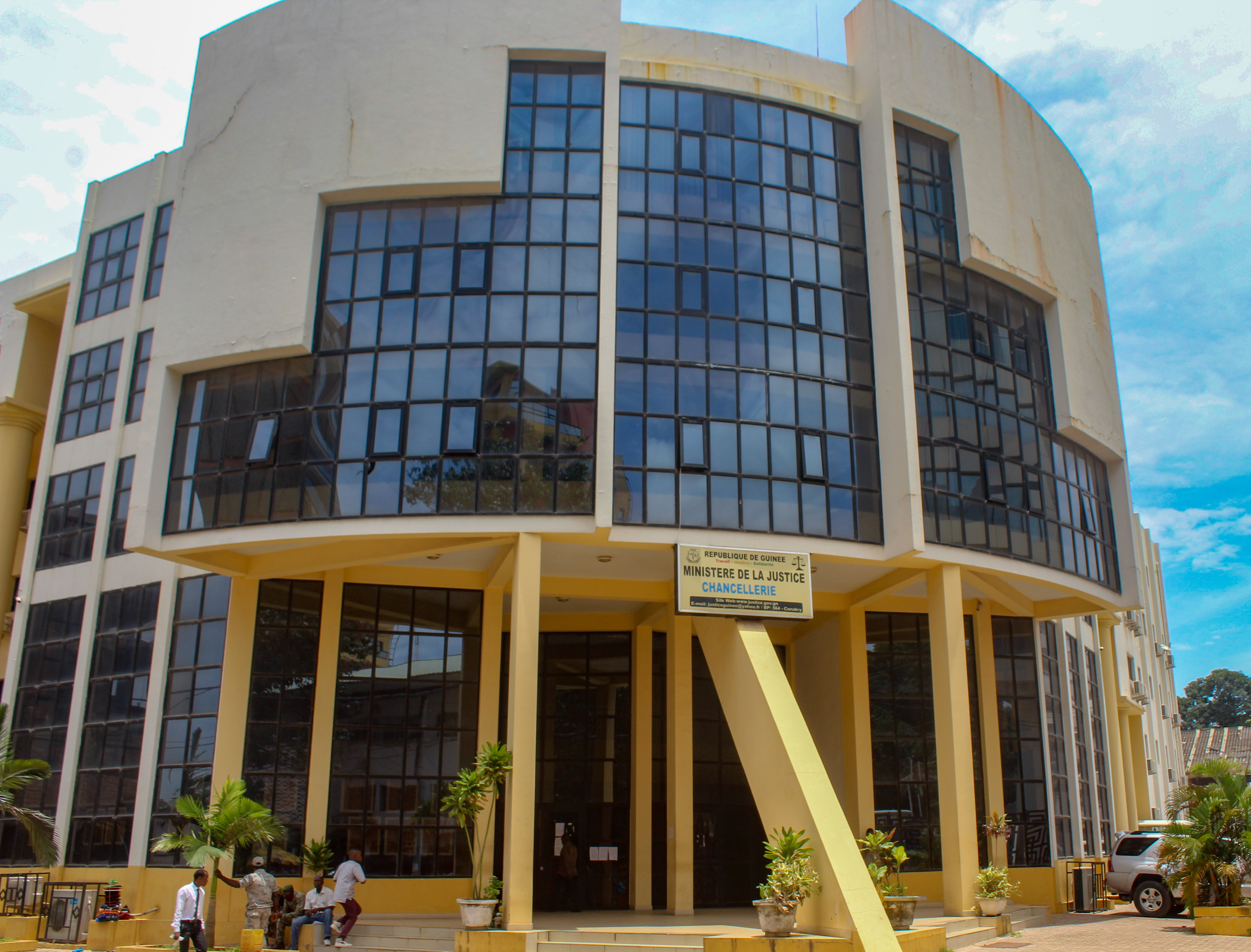

This is a list of ministers of justice of Guinea, from independence to the present. The Ministry of Justice oversees the administration and management of the justice system in Guinea.

Start	End	Name	Title
4 October 1958	1960	Damantang Camara	Minister
1 March 1960	31 January 1961	Barry III	Minister
31 January 1961	1 January 1963	Paul Louis Faber	Minister
1 January 1963	11 February 1964	Elhadj Saifoulaye Diallo	Minister of State
11 February 1964	8 November 1964	Moussa Diakité	Minister
11 November 1964	1967	Siaka Toumani Sangare	Secretary of State
1967	19 January 1968	Doctor Saïdou Conte	Minister
19 January 1968	16 May 1969	Fode Mamadou Toure	Secretary of State
16 May 1969	October 1969	Damantang Camara	Secretary of State
1969	1971	Mohamed Kassory Bangoura	Secretary of State
1971	1971	Saliou Coumbassa	Secretary of State
15 November 1971	19 June 1972	Sikhé Camara	Secretary of State, then Minister
June 1972	1976	Telli Diallo	Secretary of State, then Minister
1976	1 June 1979	General Lansana Diané	Minister
1 June 1979	3 April 1984	Sikhé Camara	Minister
5 April 1984	22 December 1985	Jean Kolipé Lamah	Minister
22 December 1985	21 February 1991	Bassirou Barry	Minister
21 February 1991	6 February 1992	Facinet Touré	Minister
6 February 1992	23 August 1994	Dafilou Sylla	Minister
10 July 1996	7 June 2000	Togba Zogbélémou	Minister
7 June 2000	15 April 2004	Abou Camara	Minister
15 April 2004	26 May 2006	Mamadou Sylla	Minister
26 May 2006	28 March 2007	Alsény Rene Gomez	Minister
28 March 2007	19 June 2008	Paulette Kourouma [1st female]	Minister
19 June 2008	December 2008	Bachir Touré	Minister
2009	2010	Siba Nolamou	Minister
2010	2014	Christian Sow	Minister
2014	20 May 2019	Cheick Sako	Minister
27 May 2019	19 June 2020	Mamadou Lamine Fofana	Minister
19 June 2020	5 September 2021	Mory Doumbouya	Minister
2 November 2021	December 2021	Fatoumata Yarie Soumah	Minister
December 2021	July 2022	Moriba Alain Koné	Minister
July 2022	February 2024	Alphonse Charles Wright	Minister
March 2024	Incumbent	Yaya Kairaba Kaba	Minister

== See also ==
- Justice ministry
- Politics of Guinea
