= Republican Guard (Guinea) =

Military unit of Guinea

- Garde républicaine
- Country: Guinea
- Branch: Republic of Guinea Armed Forces
- Type: Republican Guard
- Role: Protection of government officials and installations
- Size: 2,500 personnel
- Garrison/HQ: Conakry

Commanders
- Commander-in-chief: 5th President Mamady Doumbouya

The Republican Guard of Guinea (French: Garde républicaine de Guinée) is the state organization of Guinea responsible for the protection of government officials and buildings, and acts as a reserve force for the National Gendarmerie. It often aids the gendarmerie by assisting them in rural areas, and providing equipment and personnel for other operations. The guard is under command of the Republic of Guinea Armed Forces, and has about 2,500 personnel.

It provides a military band and guard of honour for ceremonies of state as well as provides motorcycle escorts to Sekhoutoureah Presidential Palace.

== History ==
At independence in 1958 the Orchestré de la Garde Républicaine (Band of the Republican Guard) became Guinea's first state orchestra. On 1 November 1959, it was instructed to remove all European tunes in order to nationalize the military. In later years they were split into two groups: the 1st formation (which later became the Super Boiro Band) and 2nd formation.
