= Sékouba Konaté =

President of Guinea from 2009 to 2010

General Sékouba Konaté

President of Guinea
- Acting
- In office 3 December 2009 – 21 December 2010
- Prime Minister: Kabiné Komara; Jean-Marie Doré
- Preceded by: Moussa Dadis Camara
- Succeeded by: Alpha Condé

2nd Chairman of the National Council for Democracy and Development
- In office 15 January 2010 – 21 December 2010; Acting: 3 December 2009 – 15 January 2010
- Vice Chairman: Vacant
- Preceded by: Moussa Dadis Camara
- Succeeded by: Council dissolved

Vice Chairman of the National Council for Democracy and Development
- In office 15 January 2010 – 21 December 2010
- Chairman: Moussa Dadis Camara; Himself (acting)
- Preceded by: Council formed
- Succeeded by: Council abolished

Personal details
- Born: 6 June 1964 (age 62) Conakry, Guinea
- Party: National Council for Democracy and Development
- Spouse: Mariama Sakho Konate (m. 2012)
- Children: Jeannette Bassoum Konate
- Education: Académie Militaire Royale
- Profession: Soldier
- Nickname: El Tigre

Military service
- Allegiance: Guinea
- Branch/service: Guinean Army
- Years of service: 1985–2021
- Rank: General

General Sékouba Konaté (N'Ko: ߛߋߞߎߓߊ ߞߏ߬ߣߊ߬ߕߋ; born 6 June 1964) is a former general of the Guinean Army who formerly served as the vice president of its military junta, the National Council for Democracy and Development. After attending military academy, he received the nickname "El Tigre" for his action in battle, and gained such popularity with the people he was favored to be president of the government. However, he was appointed vice president; but took control of the country when the president was shot in December 2009.

== Life ==
Konaté was born in Conakry in 1964 to a Guinean father from the Mandinka tribe and a Lebanese mother. He attended the Académie Militaire Royale in the Moroccan city of Meknes, graduating in 1990. He suffers from an unknown physical illness, possibly of his liver.

== Military career ==
For his military prowess in combat, Konaté was nicknamed "El Tigre". He was trained as a parachutist, and fought in many battles in the RFDG Insurgency during 2000–2001. Because of his reputation as a soldier, many people supported him to be the junta leader: he is still popular with the people. In October 2021, he was retired from the army.

== Political career ==
Guinea's president, Lansana Conté, died after a long illness in December 2008. The day afterwards, Moussa Camara, a military captain, stepped forward and declared Guinea to be under junta rule, with himself as the head. Konaté demanded that he be considered to rule the junta, and Camara and him drew lots to determine who would be president. After drawing twice, due to accusations of Camara cheating, Konaté was made the vice president. He was also made the minister of defense.

On 3 December 2009, Camara was shot in an attempted assassination by his aide-de-camp, Aboubacar Diakité. While he was airlifted to Morocco for treatment, Konaté was placed in charge of the country. With Camara still in rehabilitation, the United States government expressed its desire to see Camara kept out of Guinea. Konaté was appointed head of the transition regime tasked with the preparation of the 2010 presidential election. Because: "All of Camara’s actions were ill concealed attempts to take over… we’re not getting that same sense from Konate,” according to the United States Deputy Secretary of State William Fitzgerald.

In 2010, Konaté organized democratic elections, which were won by Alpha Condé. Following the transition of power, Konaté was appointed as the head of the African Union's military force.

Political offices
Preceded by Moussa Dadis Camara	President of Guinea; 2009–2010	Succeeded by Alpha Condé
