= Fatoumata Yarie Soumah =

Guinean politician

Guard of the Seals, Minister of Justice and Human Rights
- In office 2017–2021
- President: Mamady Doumbouya
- Prime Minister: Mohamed Béavogui
- Preceded by: Mory Doumbouya
- Succeeded by: Moriba Alain Koné

Fatoumata Yarie Soumah is a Guinean politician. She is a former Minister of Justice.

== Professional career ==
Before becoming a politician, she was a notary; she was notably the President of the Chamber of Notaries of Guinea.

From November 2 to December 31, 2021, she was Minister of Justice in the government of Mohamed Béavogui before being fired from the post, becoming the second woman named to the post since independence.
