= Paulette Kourouma =

Guinean magistrate and politician

Minister of Justice and Human Rights
- In office 2007–2008
- Prime Minister: Lansana Kouyaté
- Preceded by: Alsény René Gomez
- Succeeded by: Bachir Touré

Personal details
- Education: Gamal Abdel Nasser University of Conakry

Paulette Kourouma is a Guinean magistrate and politician. She served as Minister of Justice and Human Rights in the Government of Guinea from 2007 to 2008.

== Biography ==
Kourouma studied at the Gamal Abdel Nasser University of Conakry and trained as a magistrate.

Kourouma served as Minister of Justice and Human Rights in the Government of Guinea from 28 March 2007 to 20 May 2008. She was the first woman to hold this office. She established an "Independent National Commission of Inquiry" on 18 May 2007, with 19 judges and lawyers responsible for "conducting investigations into grave human rights violations and offences committed during the strikes of June 2006 and January - February 2007." The Commission established by her predecessor was criticized by the Guinean Human Rights Organization and the Guinean Bar Association over the independence of the members.

As a magistrate, Kourouma was president of the Civil, Criminal, Commercial and Social Chamber of the Supreme Court until 7 June 2012.

In 2021, Kourouma was an advisor to the Supreme Court of Guinea. She retired in 2022.

== See also ==
- Human rights in Guinea
