= Republic of Guinea Armed Forces =

Combined armed forces of Guinea

Guinean Armed Forces
- Forces armées guinéennes
- Guinea Military emblem
- Founded: 1958
- Service branches: Army; Air Force; Navy; National Gendarmerie ∟Republican Guard ∟Presidential Guard

Leadership
- Commander-in-Chief: President Mamady Doumbouya

Personnel
- Military age: 17-49
- Active personnel: Reported est. 65,000 in 2021
- Reserve personnel: 23,000

Expenditure
- Budget: $529,20 million (2021 CIA est) $36 million (2006 IISS est.)
- Percent of GDP: 1,5% (2006); 2,0% (2021)

Industry
- Foreign suppliers: China; Egypt; Russia; South Africa

Related articles
- History: Portuguese invasion of Guinea; First Liberian Civil War; Sierra Leone Civil War; Guinea-Bissau Civil War; Second Liberian Civil War
- Ranks: Military ranks of Guinea

The Guinean Armed Forces (French: Forces armées guinéennes) are the armed forces of Guinea. They are responsible for the territorial security of Guinea's border and the defence of the country against external attack and aggression.

Guinea's armed forces are divided into five branches – army, navy, air force, the paramilitary National Gendarmerie and the Republican Guard – whose chiefs report to the Chairman of the Joint Chiefs of Staff, who is subordinate to the Minister of Defense. In addition, regime security forces include the National Police Force (Sûreté National). The Gendarmerie, responsible for internal security, has a strength of several thousand, and is armed with military equipment. It is aided by the Republican Guard, which provides protection for government officials.

== History ==
Up to 41,000 Guineans may have been recruited into French forces between 1950 and 1957, many serving in Vietnam. At independence, the 12,630 Guinean soldiers serving in the French military were given the option to stay on or return to Guinea. Most decided to return home. The new armed forces were formed by incorporating some of the former French soldiers, after a careful screening process to determine political reliability, with members of the former territorial Gendarmerie to form the People's Army of Guinea (L'Armee Populaire de Guinee). By the end of January 1959 the new army had reached a strength of around 2,000 officers and soldiers. In 1966 the IISS estimated that the army had reached a strength of about 4,800, equipped with Soviet, Czech, and Chinese weaponry. Soviet armoured personnel carriers and 105-mm and 155-mm artillery had arrived.

In February 1969, the Guinean government moved against the armed forces after alleging that a plot centred in Labé, the centre of the Fula (French: Peul; Fula: Fulɓe) homeland was planning to assassinate then-president Ahmed Sékou Touré and seize power, or, failing that, force the secession of Middle Guinea. This followed military dissatisfaction over the creation of a PDG control element in each army unit. Later the alleged Fula connection was dropped, the accusations widened to other groups, and over 1,000 Guineans arrested. After the plot, the army was regarded by the government as a centre of potential subversion, and the militia was developed as a counterforce to any military threat to the government.

The army resisted the Portuguese invasion of Guinea in November 1970. Purges that followed the 1970 invasion decimated the upper ranks of the army, with eight officers sentenced to death and 900 officers and men who had reached a certain age retired from active duty. General Noumandian Keita, chief of the Combined Arms General Staff, was convicted and replaced by the army's chief of staff, Namory Kieta, who was promoted to general.

In March 1971 elements of the Guinean military were deployed to Freetown in Sierra Leone after the Sierra Leonean President, Siaka Stevens, appeared to start losing his control of the Sierra Leonean military. Stevens visited Conakry on 19 March 1971, and soon afterwards, around 200 Guinean soldiers were despatched to Freetown. Two Guinean MiGs made a low flyover of Freetown and Touré placed the Guinean military on alert 'because of the serious troubles affecting the fraternal peoples of Sierra Leone.' The force, also reported as numbering 300, protected Stevens, though it was shortly reduced to 100 and then to fifty, plus a helicopter. The last Guinean troops were withdrawn in 1974.

In early 1975 the Guinean military consisted of an army of around 5,000, an air force of 300, and a naval component of around 200. The army comprised four infantry battalions, one armoured battalion, and one engineer battalion. In the early 1970s the armed forces were organised into four military zones, corresponding to the four geographical regions (Lower Guinea, Middle Guinea, Upper Guinea, and Guinée forestière). One of the four infantry battalions was assigned to each of the military zones. The zone headquarters also doubled as battalion headquarters, and acted as a supervisory element for elements of company and platoon size assigned to each of the country's twenty-nine administrative regions.

The only concentration of troops in Conakry appeared to be the armoured battalion, with a modest number of Soviet medium tanks manufactured in the late 1940s, as well as Soviet APCs, and elements of the engineer battalion. The armed forces, though formally responsible for defending the country's territorial integrity, were really during that period focused upon national development tasks, including agricultural, industrial, and construction tasks. The engineer battalion had companies in Conakry, Kankan, and Boké, and was engaged in constructing and repairing buildings and roads.

=== The militia ===
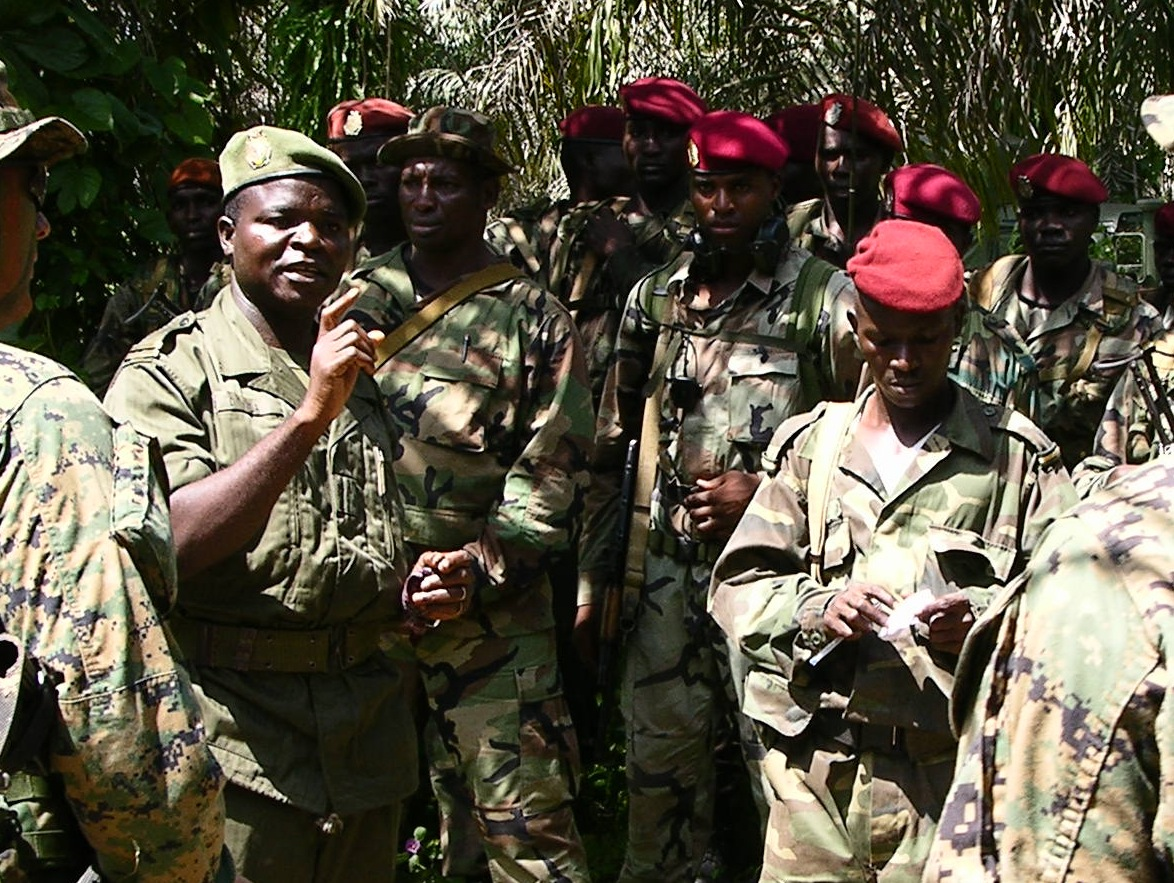
A Guinean soldier translates for other soldiers during a joint U.S.-Guinean exercise, 2005.

Increasing mistrust of the regular armed forces after the Labé plot led to the militia assuming greater importance. The militia had grown out of a 1961 Democratic Party of Guinea (PDG) decision to create workplace 'committees for the defence of the revolution.' These committees were encouraged by party officials to report dishonest practices such as theft and embezzlement of funds which might 'endanger the achievements of the revolution.'

The PDG youth arm, the Youth of the African Democratic Revolution (JRDA) was especially exhorted to report irregularities and crime to party or police authorities. Units of volunteers, formed in response to this call, assumed limited policing functions. Following government praise for these units' efforts, the militia's role expanded, especially as black-market activity and smuggling grew worse. The force was formalized as the Popular Militia (Milices Populaires) in the early 1960s, given distinctive uniforms, and linked to the developing civic service, which was engaged in national development tasks. After 1966 it was consciously modeled after the Chinese Red Guards.

In 1969, the militia was officially granted a role equivalent to the army, as a counterbalance in any military coup d'état. The elements in the Conakry area were issued small arms and given military training. Touré had heralded this policy in 1967 when he wrote: 'thanks to their special political, physical, and social training, the people's militia will become the indisputable mainspring of our security system, of which the conventional armed forces constitute [but] a fundamental section.'

The militia was re-titled the National and Popular Militia in 1974 and its regular section scaled down, as the President announced that the country could not afford the large standing force that he believed was necessary to deter what he saw as the constant threat of invasion. The militia was re-organised in multiple tiers, with a staff in Conakry, some combat units, and the remainder of the permanent element serving as a cadre for reserve militia units in villages, industrial sites, and schools.

The permanent cadre was to circulate among the villages, spending three months in each one, to train the local militia. President Touré announced that the ultimate goal was to have a 100-strong paramilitary unit in each of the country's 4,000 villages. Infantry weapons of Soviet manufacture imported from the USSR, Czechoslovakia and the PRC were to be issued as they became available.

With much focus on the militia, Touré kept much of the armed forces in poverty. The International Crisis Group said that '..conditions of service were deplorable, even for officers. The senior officer corps lived on meagre rations and saw its privileges and family allowances curtailed over time. Soldiers of all ranks had to find ways to supplement their rations and were often reduced to working either on state farms or in small agricultural projects.' '...All regular military activity, for example exercises, was considered potentially subversive.'

=== Command appointments under Sékou Touré, March 1984 ===
Source: Mamadou Kaly Bah, Regard Rétrospectif sur l'Armée Guinéenne, 1 November 1993

- Joint Headquarters (Chef: Général Toya Condé)
- Army Headquarters (Chef: Général Soma; Adjoint: Colonel Lansana Conté)
- Zone militaire de Kindia (Commandant: Capitaine Babacar N'Diaye)
- Zone militaire de Boké (Commandant: Cdt. Finando Tiani)
- Zone militaire de Labé (Commandant: Cdt. Lancei Camara)
- Zone militaire de Kankan (Commandant: Cdt. Mory Traoré)
- Zone militaire de Faranah (Commandant: Cdt. Noumoukè Keita)
- Zone militaire de Nzérékoré (Commandant: Idrissa Condé)
- Bataillon du Quartier Général (Camp Almamy Samory Touré) (Commandant: Capitaine Kerfalla Camara)
- Conakry Spécial Battalion (Camp Alfa Yaya Diallo) (Commandant: Cdt. Sidiki Condé)
- Tank Battalion (Commandant: Capitaine Baourou Condé)
- Bataillon des Troupes aéroportées (Parachutistes) (Commandant: Capitaine Lanciné Fangama Kéita)
- Air Force Headquarters (Chef: Cdt. Abdourahmane Kéita)
- Navy Headquarters (Chef: Capitaine Mohamed Lamine Sacko)
- National Gendarmerie Headquarters (Chef: Cdt. Makan Camara)
- Popular Militia Headquarters (Chef: Capitaine Mamadi Bayo)

=== The 1980s and Conté ===
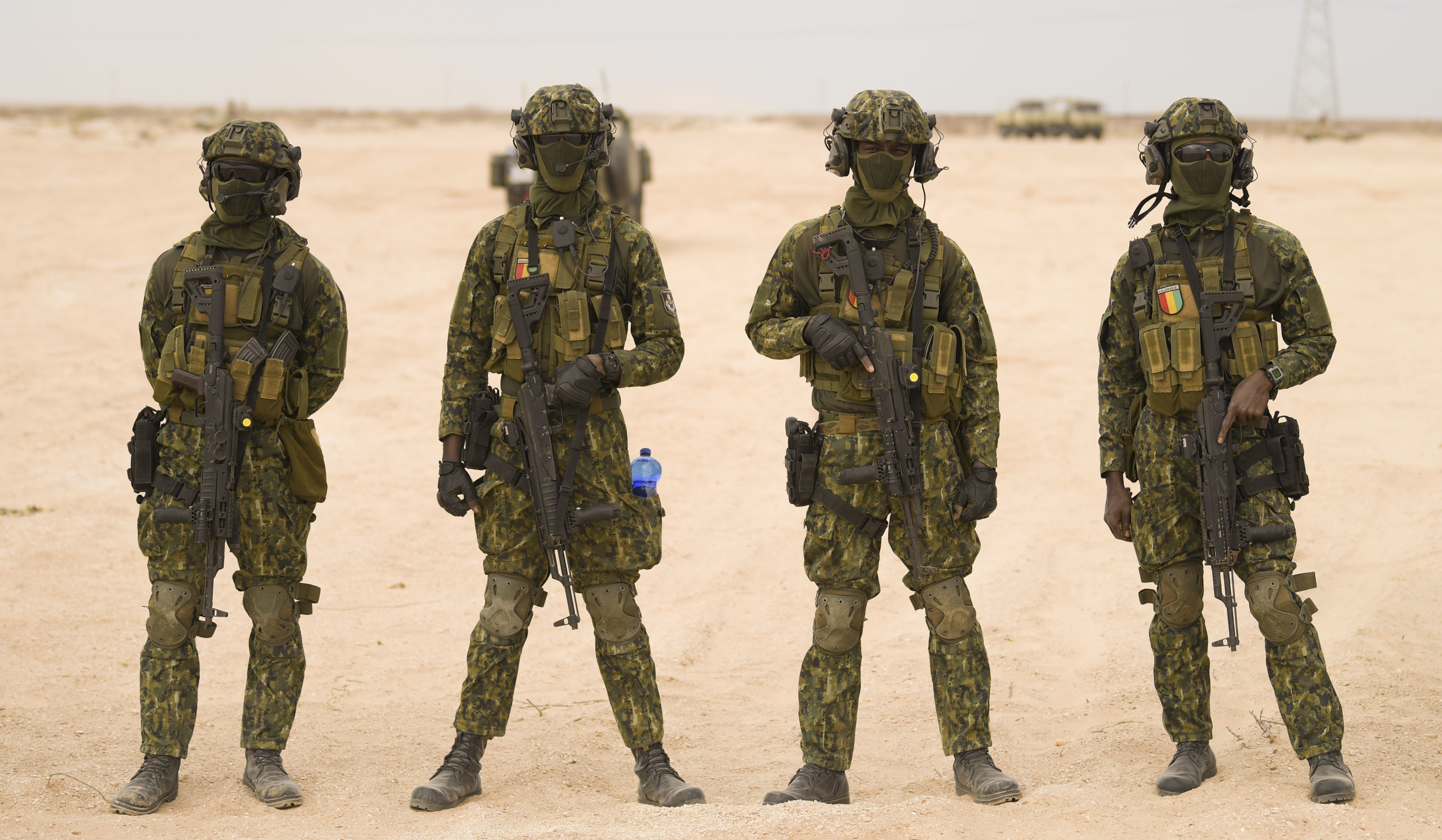
Guinean Special Forces soldiers conduct weapons range training for both close quarters rifle and sniper skills during Flintlock 20

On 3 April 1984, following Touré's death, Lansana Conté, assistant chief of staff of the army, led a coup d'état which toppled the interim head of state. A military junta, the CMRN, was installed, which started to feud within itself, and quickly, as had occurred under the Touré regime, the paramount national security concern became the preservation of the president's power. Conté had to suppress his first revolt in July 1985, by his immediate deputy, Colonel Diarra Traoré.

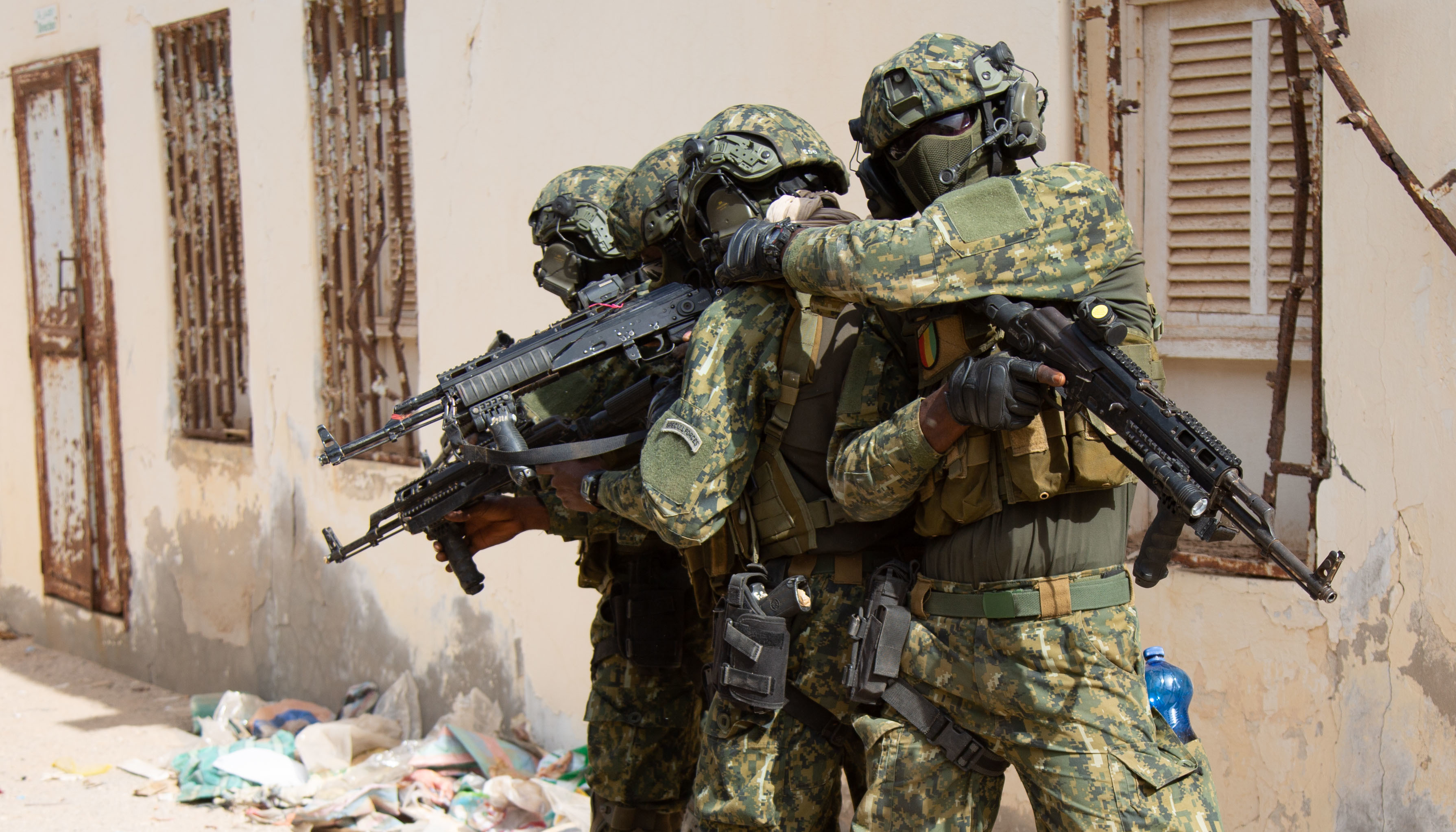
Guinean Armed Forces clear an urban structure during Flintlock 20 near Nouakchott, Mauritania (2020).

Regional conflicts in the 1990s and 2000–2001 attacks along the southern border by rebels acting as proxies for Liberia's Charles Taylor had important effects on the security forces. The Conté government was deeply involved in the First Liberian Civil War as it supported ULIMO, the major grouping opposing Taylor in Liberia. Yet on the other side of the border the Guinean government also contributed troops to the ill-fated ECOWAS peacekeeping force ECOMOG in Liberia. After ECOMOG departed in 1997–98, the Guinean government began supporting the new Liberian rebel movement LURD. Attacks by Taylor-backed rebels in 2000–01 were partially an attempt to stop this support.

More serious was a 1996 attempted coup that originated as a military mutiny caused by the armed forces' poor living conditions. Conté, 'civilianised' since a rigged election in 1993, had to make significant concessions in order to save his regime. Conté appointed his first civilian Minister of Defense in 1997.

The military was used three times in 2006–2007 to suppress popular protest: in June 2006, resulting in 16 deaths, on 22 January 2007, when it fired on protesters at the 9 November Bridge in Conakry, killing over 100, and on 9 February 2007, when it killed several more protesters.

The military suffered serious unrest in 2008 as soldiers demanded wage arrears. Among measures taken by Conté to try and shore up his support within the military after 2007 was the transfer of the 'popular Sékouba Konaté to Conakry to head the parachute Autonomous Battalion of Airborne Troops (French acronym BATA) in an attempt to calm the troops.' However, these and other measures failed to stop the coup d'état led by Moussa Dadis Camara in late December 2008.

In January 2009 a CNDD ordonnance combined four elite units of the Guinean armed forces – the presidential guards, the Bataillon Autonome des Troupes Aéroportées (BATA), the Battaillon des Commandos de Kindia (popularly known as the 'Commandos Chinois') and the Battaillon des Rangers – into a combined commando regiment.

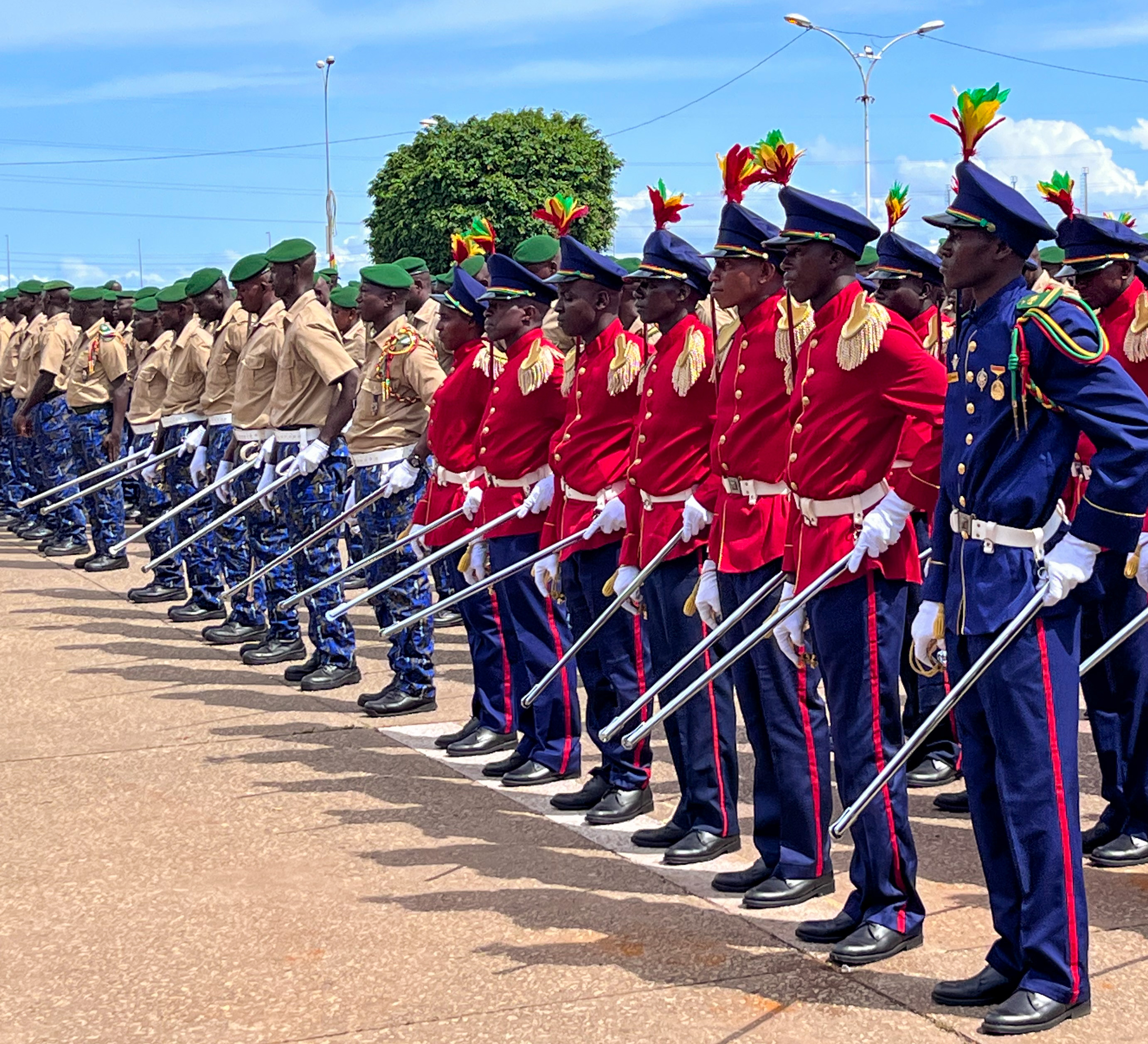
Military parade held at the Conakry palace, 2022

On 28 September 2009, in what became known as the 'Bloody Monday' massacre/2009 Guinea protest, Amnesty International said that Guinea security forces killed more than 150 people and raped over 40 women during and following the protests. More than 1,500 people were wounded and many people went missing or were detained. As of early 2010, AI said that at least two senior military officers named by the United Nations as potentially having individual criminal responsibility for events constituting crimes against humanity, remain in positions of influence in the Guinean Presidential Cabinet, despite the formation of a new transitional government.

The International Crisis Group said in September 2010 that from 2001 to 2009 the size of the armed forces has risen dramatically from 10,000 in 2001 to a reported 45,000 in 2010 (though the latter figure needs to be treated with great caution.) 'Both formal and informal recruitment contributed to this quick expansion. Erratic mass promotions have resulted in an inverted structure, with more officers than regular soldiers, undermining professionalism and straining the defence budget. Indiscipline, criminality and impunity are rife, while working and living conditions for rank-and-file soldiers are deplorable.'

== Composition ==
=== Air Force ===
After achieving independence from France in 1958, the Force Aerienne de Guinea was formed with Soviet assistance in the delivery of 10 MiG-17F fighters and two MiG-15UTI trainers. In the same era an An-2, An-12, An-14, Il-14 and Il-18V transports were delivered, Mil Mi-4 helicopters also entered service. Other eastern bloc deliveries included three Aero L-29 jet trainers, six Yak-11s and Romania contributed licensed built IAR-316 Alouette III and two IAR-330L Puma transport helicopters. Further Soviet aid was requested when Conakry Airport was opened for use by Soviet Naval Aviation maritime reconnaissance aircraft. This resulted in the delivery of eight MiG-21PFMs and a MiG-21U in 1986 to replace the remaining MiG-17s.

==== Inventory ====
Roundel of Guinea

Aircraft	Origin	Type	Variant	In service	Notes
Helicopter
Aérospatiale SA 330	France	Utility		2	
Mil Mi-17	Russia	Utility		2	
Mil Mi-24	Russia	Attack	Mi-25	3	

=== Army ===
The IISS Military Balance 2020 listed the Army as comprising 8,500 personnel, with one armoured battalion, one special forces battalion, five infantry battalions, one ranger battalion, one commando battalion, one air mobile battalion, and the Presidential Guard battalion.

There are four military regions – the 1st RM: Kindia; 2nd RM: Labé; 3rd RM: Kankan; 4ème RM: Nzérékoré, plus the Conakry special zone.

The Warsaw Pact provided most Guinean army equipment. Armored vehicles reportedly includes 30 T-34 tanks, 8 T-54 tanks (IISS 2012), and PT-76 light tanks (15 reported in service by International Institute for Strategic Studies in 2012).

=== Navy ===
The navy has about 900 personnel and operates several small patrol craft and barges.
