= Confédération générale des travailleurs africains =

Trade union centre (1956 - 1957)

CGTA
- General Confederation of African Workers
- Confédération générale des travailleurs africains
- Founded: January 14, 1956
- Location: French West Africa
- Members: 55,000
- Key people: Sékou Touré, Bassirou Guèye, Seydou Diallo

The Confédération générale des travailleurs africains ('General Confederation of African Workers', CGTA) was a trade union centre in French West Africa, in existence from 1956 to 1957.

== History ==
A leader of the French Confédération générale du travail (CGT) in West Africa, Bassirou Guèye, had begun to promote the idea that African trade unionists should make themselves independent from the French centres. At a meeting of the Senegal-Mauritania branch of CGT, held in Dakar November 11-November 12, 1955, the majority of delegates voted for separation from the French CGT and the World Federation of Trade Unions. After the break with CGT, these unions formed CGT-Autonome. A conference was held in Saint-Louis on January 14-January 15, 1956 during which CGT-Autonome and the Guinean branch of CGT formed the CGTA. Sékou Touré and Seydou Diallo became leaders of CGTA.

CGTA held its first federal bureau meeting in Conakry, November 1956. The meeting was attended by representatives from Guinea, Senegal, Mauritania, Ivory Coast, Upper Volta and Niger. The meeting decided that CGTA would remain unaffiliated to any French federation. The question on international affiliation was postponed to be decided later.

CGTA rejected the notion of class struggle in the African context, arguing that antagonistic classes were not present in African societies.

CGTA had approximately 55,000 members, slightly smaller than the CGT (which still had around 60,000 members in the region).

CGT responded to the launching of CGTA by calling for an African trade unionist unity conference. CGTA agreed in principle, but wanted to delay the holding the conference (seeking to enlarge its own ranks first, to get a better negotiating position ahead of the unity conference). There were some unions, such as the railway workers' union, that remained unaffiliated to any central. CGTA hoped that such unions would join CGTA before a unity process. The railway workers' union did however not agree to join CGTA. Instead, they called for the foundation of a single independent union federation. CGTA and CGT both agreed to the proposal, and on January 16, 1957 they (and other major union formations in French West Africa) merged to form Union générale des Travailleurs d'Afrique noire (UGTAN).
