= National Organization of Free Unions of Guinea =

ONSLG
- National Organization of Free Unions of Guinea
- Organisation Nationale des Syndicats Libres de Guinée
- Headquarters: Conakry, Guinea
- Location: Guinea
- Key people: Yamoudou Toure, secretary general
- Affiliations: ITUC

The National Organization of Free Unions of Guinea (ONSLG) is a national trade union center in Guinea. It is affiliated with the International Trade Union Confederation. It is a smaller organization in comparison with the leading trade union center in the country, the National Confederation of Guinean Workers.
