= Mamadou Sylla (politician) =

Guinean politician and businessman (1960–2026)

Mamadou Sylla (25 January 1960 – 16 April 2026) was a Guinean politician and business leader.

== Life and career ==
Born in Boké, in 1986 Sylla was one of several people given large amounts of rice by the Government to retail. Becoming wealthy, he moved to Conakry and became a senior judge.

In 1998, Sylla bought an arms importer and was awarded the contract to supply the Guinean Army. He became a significant supporter of President Lansana Conté, extending overdraft facilities to the Army and spending large sums of money supporting Conté's 2001 referendum to remove term limits.

Sylla was subsequently awarded a large number of government contracts, becoming recognised as Guinea's richest man. In 2003, he was appointed Minister of Justice. In 2004, he took Senegalese nationality in order to further his business dealings there. The following year, at the request of the Guinean government, he became the founder and leader of the Congress of Guinean Employers.

In 2005, Sylla's firm Futurelec Holding was accused of owing the government over $8,000,000, but he counter-claimed that the state was in fact indebted to him. An independent investigation concluded that while the government owed him $22 million, he actually owed it $55 million, and had a $2.7 million overdraft at the Central Bank of the Republic of Guinea - even though individuals were not permitted to hold accounts there. In 2006, he was jailed, accused of embezzlement of public funds and issuing bouncing cheques, but he was released in December 2006 through the intervention of Conté, who went to the jail in person to set Sylla free. This became a major complaint of the 2007 Guinean general strike.

He became the Honorary President of the ruling Party of Unity and Progress (PUP) on 26 May 2007, in a ceremony at which Conté was present. He had been chosen for that position by acclamation. As Sylla was an extremely controversial figure, the decision to make him Honorary President of the PUP was viewed as surprising by many.

Sylla was a close personal friend of President Conté, and his influence with Conté was reputedly so great that he could have any government minister dismissed. Conté died after a long illness in December 2008 and the military immediately seized power in a coup d'état, expressing a firm intention to crack down on corruption. On 29 December 2008, soldiers forcefully entered Sylla's compound and told Sylla to relinquish the keys to six SUV vehicles that they said were owned by the state. Sylla did so, while complaining about the soldiers' methods; he said that there had been no need to enter the compound by force—"the door [was] wide open"—and that his aides had been frightened. He insisted that a phone call would have been sufficient and said that the six SUVs were part of a contract between Futurelec and the military, according to which Futurelec was to deliver 150 vehicles.

On 21 January 2009, Sylla was among those who were ordered by the junta to appear before an anti-corruption audit commission.

Sylla died in Conakry on 16 April 2026, at the age of 66.
