= Manimou Camara =

- Born: July 1978 (age 48); Matam, Conakry Region, Guinea
- Occupations: Drummer, dancer
- Instruments: Djembe, dunun, sangban, kenkeni, kringni
- Member of: Dounia Djembe
- Website: www.douniadjembe.com

Manimou Camara (born July 1978, Matam, Conakry Region, Guinea) is a master drummer and dancer from Guinea. Manimou specializes in several percussive instruments, namely the dynamic hand drum called djembe, three bass drums called dunun, sangban, and kenkeni as well as the kringni. He is the founder of Dounia Djembe, a Seattle-based percussion and dance company. He is a member of the Kpelle people and Malinke ethnic groups.

Manimou Camara began studying the music and dance of his native Guinea, West Africa at the age of twelve. His primary education was spent with Sekou Dico Sylla (now a Vancouver, BC resident), Karamoko Daman (Karamo Dama) and nationally recognized Ballet Saamato. He has played lead dunun for Mohamed Kemoko Sano's world-renowned Ballet Merveille and conducted rhythm and dance camps for people from Europe, Japan, and the United States.

Manimou now resides in the Seattle metropolitan area where he works closely with acclaimed Ghanaian performance artist Awal Alhassan.
