= Syndicat des Acteurs de la Monnaie Électronique de Guinée =

Trade union of mobile money workers in Guinea

SAMEL-G
- Guinea Electronic Money Actors' Union
- Syndicat des Acteurs de la Monnaie Électronique de Guinée
- Location: Guinea
- Key people: Amadou Yero Diallo, Secretary General

The Syndicat des Acteurs de la Monnaie Électronique de Guinée (SAMEL-G) is a trade union of mobile money workers in Guinea. Two notable mobile money providers in the country are MTN Group and Orange S.A.

== History ==
In early 2022, SAMEL-G joined a pre-existing strike of Orange Money distributors, leading to a general strike of Orange's distributor and vendors. Demands included commissions on transactions and recharges and a dedicated support hotline. The union also called on the Guinean government to keep in mind the preservation of workplaces in their regulation of telecom companies.
