= Eugène Camara =

Prime Minister of Guinea

Eugène Camara (21 January 1942 – 22 November 2019) was a politician from Guinea who was briefly Prime Minister of Guinea in February 2007.

== Early life and career ==
Camara was born in Nzérékoré and received his primary education in Guinea before going to Senegal for school from 1957 to 1959; he then returned to Guinea to continue his education in Conakry. In the early 1970s he was General Coordinator of the Sonfonia furniture factory, responsible to the Ministry of Industry and Energy. He was then placed in charge of financial coordination of industry and energy, and from 1973 to 1974 he was Deputy Director of Industry and Energy. He became an intern at the International Center for Public Enterprises in Ljubljana, Yugoslavia, in 1974; when he returned to Guinea, he became Director of the Plan and Statistics of the Ministry of Industry and Energy in 1977, and from 1977 to 1984 he was Financial Director of the projects of the Ministry of Industry.

From 1983 to 1985, Camara was President of the Technical Committee of the Board of Salguidia, a company. He was confirmed as Secretary General of the Ministry of Industrial Development in 1985. In 1991, he was appointed as a member of the Transitional Committee for National Reform by President Lansana Conté. From 1992 to 1994 he was Governor of the Administrative Region of Guinée Forestière, and from 1994 to 1997 he was Governor of the Administrative Region of Kindia.

Camara was appointed as Minister of Higher Education and Scientific Research on 17 November 1997, serving in that position until he was named Minister of the Plan on 1 March 2004. He was moved from the latter position to that of Minister of State for Presidential Affairs on 19 January 2007, replacing Fodé Bangoura.

== Prime minister ==
He was appointed as prime minister by President Conté on 9 February 2007, following a general strike in January that ended with Conté agreeing to appoint a new prime minister who would be head of government. The position of prime minister had been vacant since the dismissal of Cellou Dalein Diallo in April 2006; prior to Camara, prime ministers in Guinea had not been heads of government.

The appointment of Camara, a member of the ruling Unity and Progress Party (PUP), did not go down well with the opposition, who rebuffed Camara as a man of the old establishment. Following his appointment violence erupted in several parts of the country. Labor unions restarted the strike on 12 February, and Conté declared martial law on the same day. A proposal to leave Camara in office as prime minister for three months as a trial period was rejected by the unions on 20 February. On 25 February, it was announced that Conté had agreed to appoint a new prime minister from a list of individuals chosen by the unions and representatives of civil society, and the unions said that the strike would end on 27 February. Conté chose the new prime minister, Lansana Kouyaté, on 26 February. On 1 March, Camara presided over Kouyaté's swearing in ceremony, at which Conté was not present.

== Death ==
He died in Tinus on 22 November 2019.

== See also ==
- Politics of Guinea

Political offices
Preceded by Cellou Dalein Diallo	Prime Minister of Guinea; 2007	Succeeded by Lansana Kouyaté
