= Mohamed Mancona Kouyaté =

Guinean politician, activist (1924–1998)

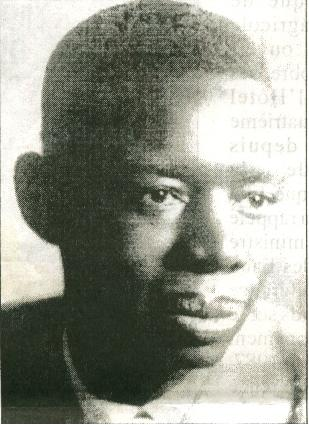
Mohamed Mancona Kouyaté

Mohamed Mancona Kouyaté (1924 – 13 September 1998) was a Guinean political figure and activist. He received his primary education at schools in Macenta and Nzerekore from 1930 to 1939, and entered the Camille Guy upper primary school in Conakry, before studying at the École normale supérieure William Ponty in Senegal from 1942 to 1945. He served in the general government of the AOF (French West Africa) for 7 years and returned to Guinea in 1952. He was an anti-colonial activist, and joined the Democratic Party of Guinea (PDG) in 1952. He was Ambassador of Guinea to the former Yugoslavia from 1975 to 1979 and then Director of Cabinet of the Ministry of State Control, where he remained in office until his retirement in 1985.
