= General Union of the Workers of Guinea =

Trade union in Guinea

UGTG
- General Union of the Workers of Guinea
- Union Générale des Travailleurs de Guinée
- Headquarters: Conakry, Guinea
- Location: Guinea
- Key people: Mamadou Mara, president
- Affiliations: ITUC

The General Union of the Workers of Guinea (UGTG) is a national trade union center in Guinea. It is affiliated with the International Trade Union Confederation.
