= Zeinab Camara =

Guinean politician

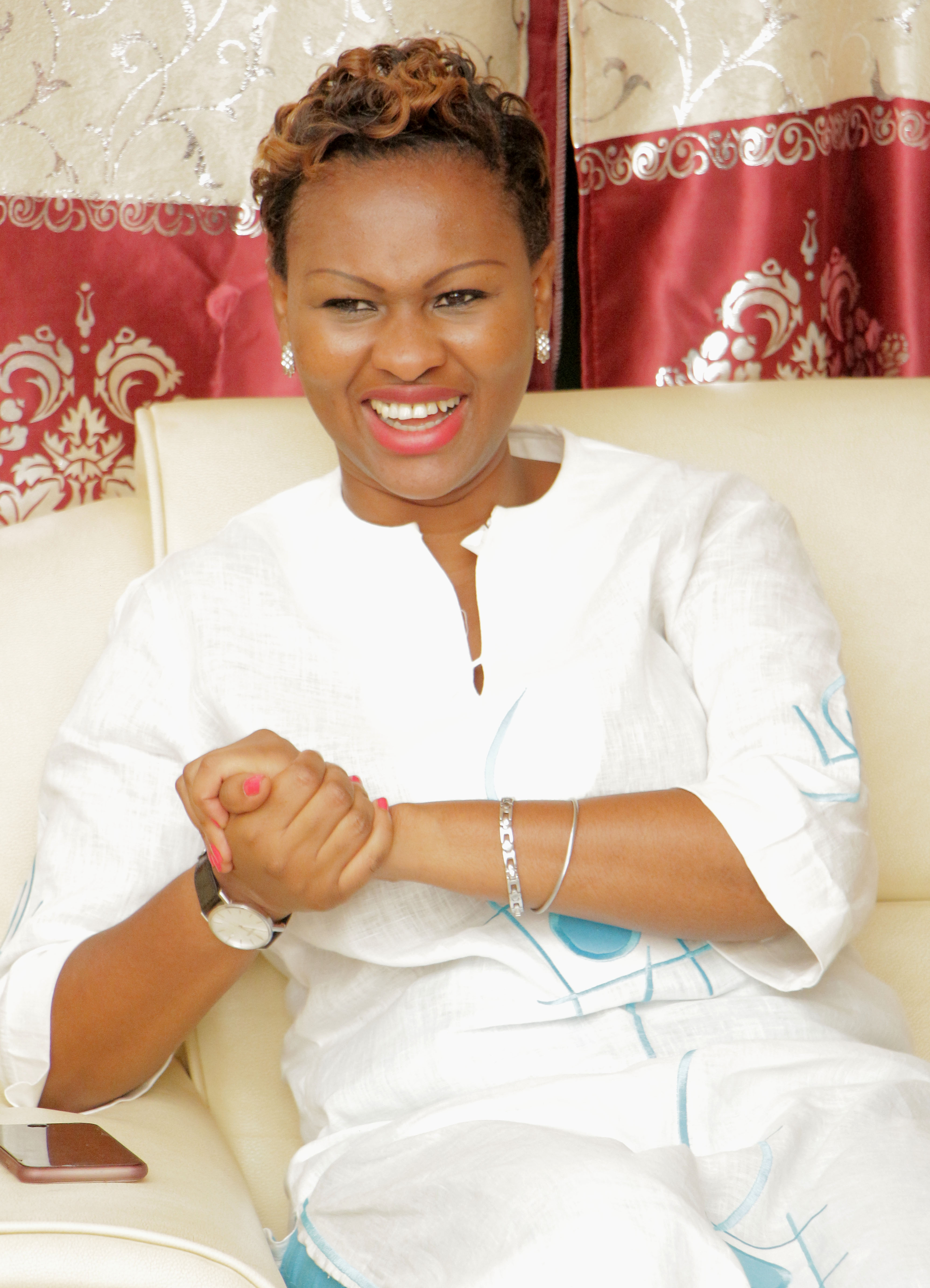

Deputy in the National Assembly (Guinea)
- Preceded by: Mohamed Sankoun Soumah
- Constituency: Boffa Prefecture

Personal details
- Born: January 27, 1981 (age 45) Guinea
- Party: Rally of the Guinean People
- Education: De Montfort University, Leicester University
- Occupation: Politician
- Known for: politics, football

Zeinab Camara (born January 27, 1981) is a Guinean politician. She was the first woman to lead a football club in Guinea.

== Life ==
Camara was born in Guinea. She moved to Leicester to study; first International Relations at De Montfort University and then at nearby Leicester University where she studied Strategic Public Management. She returned to Guinea where she worked for Rio Tinto Simandou working with government ministers. In 2014 she was an Archbishop Desmond Tutu Leadership Fellow.

Camara became the Head of Cabinet of the Guinean Ministry of Higher Education and Scientific Research. She was appointed by the President Alpha Conde despite her being young.

She was interested in football and she saw it as a vehicle for directing the interests of local youths. She became the president of the Fatala Football Club in Boffa and she became the first woman to lead a football club in Guinea. The club tries to address truancy from many schools by opening an Ortega football academy where school attendance is mandatory. The club is in the second national division, but it was in 2014 in the third.

Camara has stood for election for Boffa for the ruling party in February 2020, based on her work in government and her work in football. In 2020 there was a rally at the stadium in Koba.
