= Elhadj Oumar Traoré =

Guinean politician

Elhadj Oumar Traoré is a Guinean politician. As of 2009, he was the regional president of the Nzérékoré Region of Guinea in the south-east.
