= Ibrahima Conté =

Ibrahima Conté may refer to:

- Ibrahima Conté (footballer, born 1996), Guinean defender
- Ibrahima Conté (footballer, born 1991), Guinean midfielder
- Ibrahima Conté (footballer, born 1981), Guinean football defender
