= Fodé Soumah =

Guinean politician

Fodé Soumah is a politician from Guinea.

Soumah was a prominent figure in the ruling Party of Unity and Progress and was appointed as the Deputy Governor of the Central Bank of Guinea. Following the 2003 Guinean presidential election, Soumah was appointed the Minister of Youth and Sports. In this post, he also headed the nation's Olympic Committee.

Soumah was indicted in December 2006 for complicity, while Deputy Governor of the Bank, in the withdrawal of $22 million by Mamadou Sylla. Along with Sylla, he was released by the personal intervention of President Lansana Conté. This became a major complaint leading to the 2007 Guinean general strike. After the election of Alpha Condé as president, Soumah was appointed political advisor to the president until his death on Tuesday March 27, 2012 in Morocco following an illness.
