= 8 November Bridge =

8 November Bridge Pont 8 Novembre
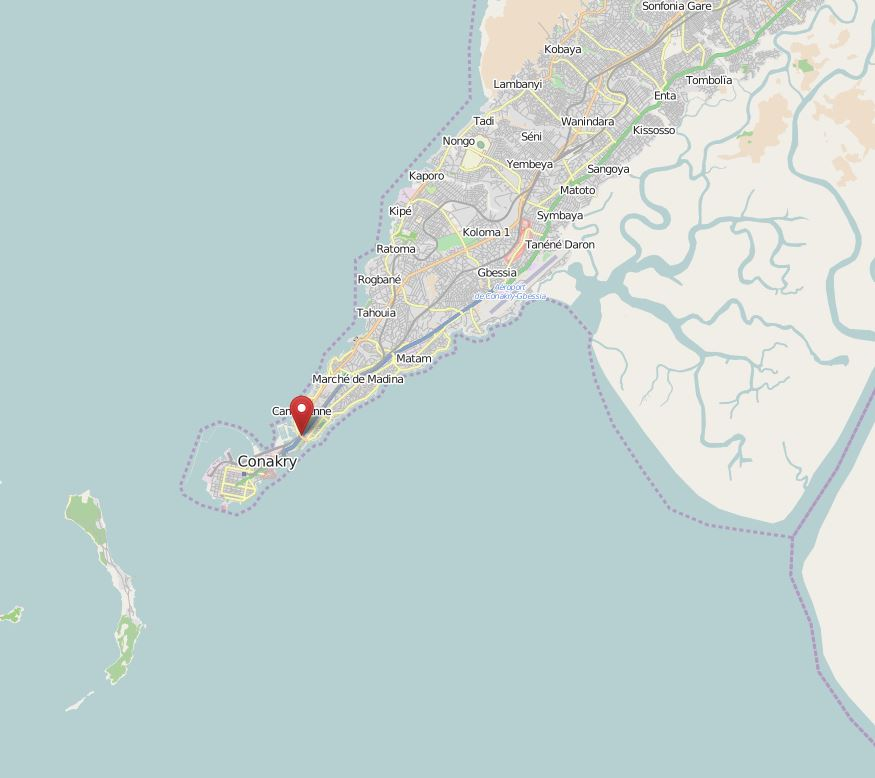
- Location of bridge in peninsula
- Coordinates: 9.5255°N 13.6882°W
- Locale: Conakry, Guinea

8 November Bridge (Guinea)

The 8 November Bridge (Pont 8 Novembre) is a bridge in Conakry, Guinea. It has strategic significance, given that the bridge cuts the Central Business District off from the rest of the city. During coups the bridge has played an important role. The bridge was built in the 1960s and demolished on 10 March 2012.
