= Abdoulaye Soumah =

Guinean footballer

Personal information
- Full name: Abdoulaye Soumah
- Date of birth: November 12, 1985 (age 40)
- Place of birth: Conakry, Guinea
- Position: Goalkeeper

Youth career
- Friguiagbé fc

Senior career*
Years	Team	Apps	(Gls)
2004–2006	Fello Star	36	(0)
2006–2007	USM Alger	23	(0)
2007	OMR El Annasser	21	(0)
- * Club domestic league appearances and goals

Abdoulaye Soumah (born November 12, 1985, in Conakry) is a Guinean football player who currently plays for AS Batè Nafadji.

== Career ==
Soumah played professional for USM Alger and OMR El Annasser in the Algerian league.
