= Isseaga Soumah =

Guinean footballer

Issiaga Soumah
Personal information
- Date of birth: 14 May 1974 (age 52)
- Place of birth: Conakry, Guinea
- Height: 1.78 m (5 ft 10 in)
- Position: Midfielder

Team information
- Current team: Tours FC
- Number: 24

Senior career*
| Years | Team | Apps | (Gls) |
| 1991–1997 | AS Kaloum Star | | |
| 1997–1998 | Club Sportif de Hammam-Lif | | |
| 1999 | FC 105 Libreville | | |
| 1999–2001 | AS Angoulême | | |
| 2001–present | Tours FC | | |

International career
- Guinea
- * Club domestic league appearances and goals

Isseaga Soumah (born 14 May 1974) is a Guinean former footballer who played as a midfielder.
