= Sékou Kouréissy Condé =

Guinean politician

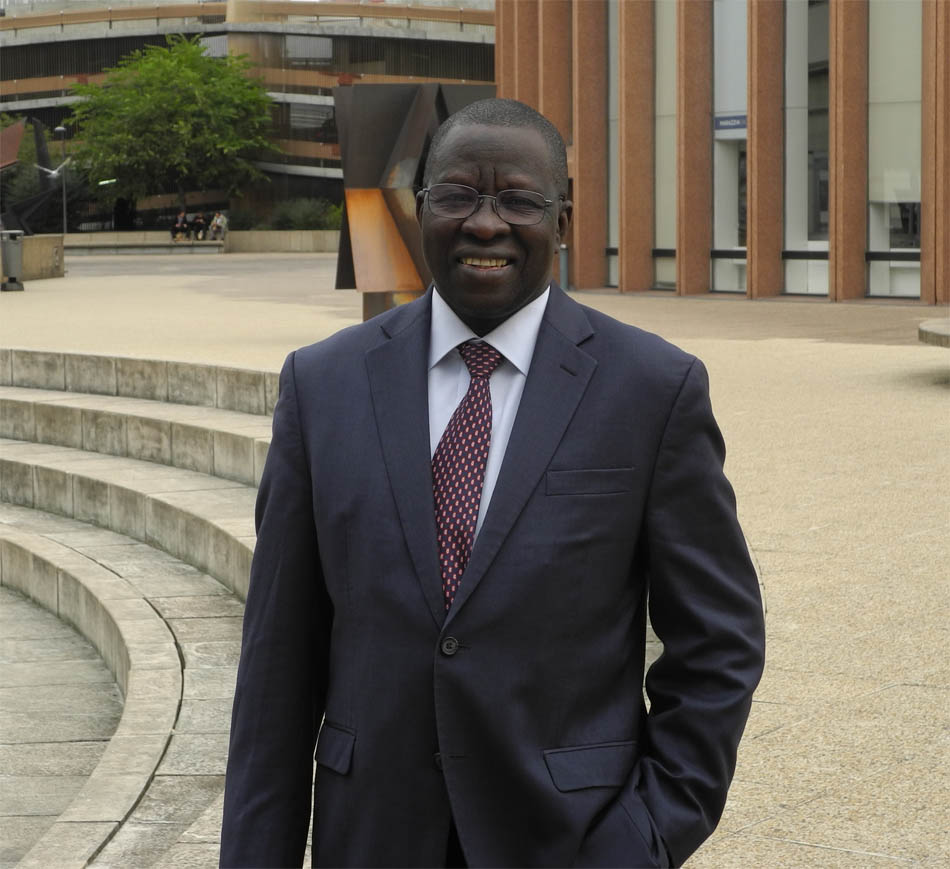
Sekou Koureissy Conde

Sékou Kouréissy Condé (born 1954) is a Guinean politician and academic.

Condé was born in Kouroussa. After the death of his father, he lived with his uncle, El Hadj Sorry. He received a grant to study in the Czech Republic specifically at Charles University in Prague. In 1985 he received a doctorate in criminology and moved to Germany where he worked as an assistant specialising in African affairs for the Christian Democratic Union (CDU/CSU).

After some years of exile, he returned to Guinea in 1993 and founded his own political party, ARENA. In 1997, President Lansana Conté appointed him as Minister of Security. At the end of his service, he went into exile in the United States, together with another former minister, Kassory Fofana.

Condé is currently teaching at Columbia University and New York University's Institute of African-American Affairs and the Africana Studies Program, and President and co-founded of the American Council on Africa.
