= Rabiatou Sérah Diallo =

Guinean trade unionist (1949–2023)

Rabiatou Serah Diallo (31 December 1949 – 28 June 2023) was a Guinean trade unionist. She was the secretary-general of the National Confederation of Guinean Workers (Confédération Nationale des Travailleurs de Guinée, CNTG).

Diallo was born on 31 December 1949 in Mamou, Guinea. She took a secretarial course at the Ecole des Cadres Techniques in Conakry from 1964 to 1966. She worked as a government administrative assistant during the regime of Ahmed Sékou Touré from 1966 to 1979. After completing special legal training at the Institut Polytechnique Gamal Abdel Nasser de Conakry (1975–1978), she became successively "an intern at the Justice Ministry (1979–1980), court clerk at the Regional Tribunal of Conakry I (1980–1984), deputy presiding judge at the Children's Court (1984–1985), a magistrate at the Justice Ministry's Labor Tribunal (1997), and the officer in charge of women's rights at the Ministry of Women's and Children's Affairs (1997)."

Her work as a labor unionist began early. In 1966, "she was elected to the labor unit of the Presidency of the Republic". Diallo was the secretary-general of the District Workers Committee in Conakry from 1981 to 1984, a member of the Executive Committee of the Confédération Nationale des Travailleurs de Guinée (CNTG), and secretary-general of the CNTG, first elected in 2000. From February 2010 to January 2014, she was the president of the National Transitional Council. She received numerous honors and prizes.

In May 2006, Diallo returned to Guinea after a long absence. Kanfy Camara, who closely resembled her, was murdered shortly afterwards, an event which was viewed by the ICFTU as a botched attempt to kill Diallo.

Diallo died on 28 June 2023, at the age of 73.
