= National Confederation of Guinean Workers =

National trade union in Guinea

- Confédération Nationale des Travailleurs de Guinée
- Headquarters: Conakry, Guinea
- Location: Guinea
- Key people: Rabiatou Serah Diallo, secretary general
- Affiliations: ITUC

The National Confederation of Guinean Workers (Confédération Nationale des Travailleurs de Guinée, CNTG) is a national trade union center in Guinea. The CNTG is the largest trade union centre in Guinea, and is affiliated with the International Trade Union Confederation.

Ahmed Sékou Touré, the former president of Guinea, became the leader of the Guinea branch of the French Confédération Générale du Travail in 1948. The union was renamed to the CNTG in 1956.
