= Lansana Kouyaté =

Prime Minister of Guinea

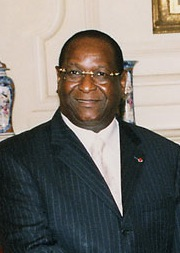

8th Prime Minister of Guinea
- In office 1 March 2007 – 23 May 2008
- President: Lansana Conté
- Preceded by: Eugène Camara
- Succeeded by: Ahmed Tidiane Souaré

Personal details
- Born: 15 July 1950 (age 76) Koba, Guinea (then a colony of France)

Lansana Kouyaté (born 15 July 1950) is a Guinean politician and diplomat who served as Prime Minister of Guinea from 2007 to 2008. Previously he was Executive Secretary of the Economic Community of West African States (ECOWAS) from 1997 to 2002.

== Background and earlier career ==
Kouyaté was born in Koba, Guinea, then a French colony. He studied administration at the University of Conakry before joining the civil service. In 1976, he was appointed as Director of Labour, then the following year, moved to become Director of Trade, Prices and Statistics, where he had responsibility for state-owned companies.

In 1982, Kouyaté worked on a rice development project, then moved to the diplomatic service, joining Guinea's delegation in Côte d'Ivoire. In 1985, he returned to the Foreign Ministry in Conakry as head of African and Organisation of African Unity affairs. Two years later, he became Guinea's ambassador to Egypt, Jordan, Lebanon, Sudan, Syria and Turkey. In 1992, he became Guinea's Permanent Representative at the United Nations, where he became Vice President of the United Nations Economic and Social Council.

In 1993, he was appointed as the Deputy Special Representative of the Secretary-General in Somalia for the UNOSOM II mission, then in February 1994 became the Acting Representative. In June 1994, he became the Assistant Secretary-General in the UN Department of Political Affairs, one of his first missions being a tour around ECOWAS member states to discuss the situation in Liberia. He continued his involvement in discussions to build regional support for a resolution of the First Liberian Civil War. He left this job in September 1997 to become the Executive Secretary of the Economic Community of West African States (ECOWAS), a post he held until February 2002.

During his time at ECOWAS, Kouyaté was awarded the Legion d'Honneur (Commander), the African Star of Liberia and was made a Commander of the Mono Order of Togo.

== Prime minister ==
As a result of a general strike in early 2007, Kouyaté was nominated for the post of Prime Minister of Guinea on 26 February 2007. He was selected by President Lansana Conté from a list provided by trade union leaders. On 1 March, he was sworn in as Prime Minister at a ceremony in Conakry; Conté was not present. His government was named on 28 March, composed of 19 ministers and three secretaries of state; it contained none of the members of the old government.

On 5 December 2007, a decree restructuring ministries increased the powers of the Secretary-General of the Presidency at the expense of those of the Prime Minister, and on 3 January 2008 Conté dismissed and replaced Justin Morel Junior, the Minister of Communication and Government Spokesman, without consulting Kouyaté. On 4 January, Kouyaté demanded that Morel be restored to his position and said that he would not sit at the Council of Ministers with Morel's replacement. Labor unions announced plans to begin a new "unlimited general strike" on 10 January, demanding that Conté's agreement with the unions be properly implemented and that Morel be restored. Kouyaté's government chose to attempt to resolve the situation through dialogue with Conté in hopes of maintaining peace. On 9 January, the unions withdrew their call for a strike.

Tensions between Kouyaté and Conté increased over the decision by Kouyaté's government to repatriate Chantal Cole, Conté's advisor in charge of communications at the presidential palace, to France; in addition, they disagreed over Kouyaté's decision to allow Libyans to manage luxury hotels.

== Dismissal and subsequent events ==
In a decree read on state television on 20 May 2008, Kouyaté was dismissed by Conté and replaced by Ahmed Tidiane Souaré. This was considered surprising; it had been generally believed that Kouyaté would not be dismissed prior to the planned December 2008 parliamentary election. Following the announcement, protests were reported in Conakry and Kouroussa, although the cities were reportedly calm again by 21 May; protests were also reported in Kankan on 20 and 21 May.

Kouyaté was widely considered a disappointment in his role as Prime Minister, and his unpopularity meant that his dismissal was not greeted with major unrest of the kind that led to his appointment a year earlier; in particular, his time in office was associated with rising food prices, deepening the country's economic problems. He was also accused of having presidential ambitions. Because he had not consulted with the opposition when forming his government and had not invited opposition politicians to participate in it, the opposition welcomed his dismissal and urged Souaré to avoid his mistakes. The Secretary-General of the Union of Democratic Forces of Guinea (UFDG), Amadou Oury Bah, described Kouyaté as "a danger to the democratic process". One union leader, Rabiatou Serah Diallo, said that until the composition of Souaré's government was announced, she had nothing to say. Souaré was sworn in on 23 May; Kouyaté was not present at the ceremony, as he was unable to leave his home due to a crowd of supporters outside of it.

Many soldiers, dissatisfied over their failure to receive wage arrears, were unhappy with Kouyaté's dismissal, feeling that it left them with no one to whom they could address their grievances. On 26 May 2008, unrest broke out among the soldiers as they demanded their wage arrears.

Political offices
Preceded by Edouard Benjamin	Executive Secretary of the Economic Community of West African States; 1997–2002	Succeeded by Mohamed Ibn Chambas
Preceded by Eugène Camara	Prime Minister of Guinea; 2007–2008	Succeeded by Ahmed Tidiane Souaré
