= Union syndicale des travailleurs de Guinée =

USTG
- United Trade Union of Guinean Workers
- Union Syndicale des Travailleurs de Guinée
- Headquarters: Conakry, Guinea
- Location: Guinea
- Key people: Abdoulaye Sow, secretary general
- Affiliations: ITUC

The United Trade Union of Guinean Workers (Union syndicale des travailleurs de Guinée, USTG) is a national trade union center in Guinea. It is affiliated with the International Trade Union Confederation.
