= National Council for Democracy and Development =

Ruling military junta of Guinea from 2008 to 2010

The National Council for Democracy and Development (French: Conseil national pour la démocratie et le développement, CNDD) was the ruling junta of Guinea from 2008 to 2010.

== Historical background ==
The CNDD seized power in the 2008 Guinean coup d'état on 23 December 2008. This followed the death of the previous long-serving President, Lansana Conté.

== Government ==
On 5 May 2009, the government recalled thirty of the country's overseas ambassadors - about three quarters of the nation's total. No reason was given for the decision.

== Members ==
On 23 December, the CNDD announced that the Council's members were:

1. Captain Moussa Dadis Camara - previously head of the army's fuel supplies unit
2. Brigadier General Mamadouba Camara
3. Lt-Col Sékouba Konaté - previously head of an elite army unit
4. Lt-Col Mathurin Bangoura
5. Lt-Col Aboubacar Sidiki Camara
6. Commandant Oumar Baldé
7. Commandant Mamadi Mara
8. Commandant Almamy Camara
9. Lieutenant Mamadou Bhoye Diallo
10. Captain Kolako Béavogui
11. Lt-Col Kandia Mara
12. Colonel Sékou Mara
13. Morciré Camara
14. Alpha Yaya Diallo
15. Lt-Col Mamadou Korka Diallo
16. Captain Kéléti Faro
17. Lieutenant Colonel Fodéba Touré
18. Commandant Cheick Tidiane Camara
19. Colonel Sékou Sako
20. Sub-Lieutenant Claude Pivi
21. Lieutenant Saa Alphonse Touré
22. Moussa Kéïta
23. Aédor Bah
24. Commandant Bamou Lama
25. Mohamed Lamine Kaba
26. Captain Daman Condé
27. Commandant Amadou Doumbouya
28. Lieutenant Moussa Kékoro Camara
29. Chief Adjutant Issa Camara
30. Lt-Col Abdoulaye Chérif Diaby
31. Dr Diakité Aboubacar Chérif
32. Mamadi Condé
33. Sub-Lieutenant Cheick Ahmed Touré

== See also ==
- Moussa Dadis Camara#Christmas coup
- Lansana Conté#Death
- Politics of Guinea
