= 1954 Guinea by-election =

← 1951	June 27, 1954	1956 →

Constituency of Guinea
- Registered: 466,666
- Turnout: 55.13% (▼1.82pp)
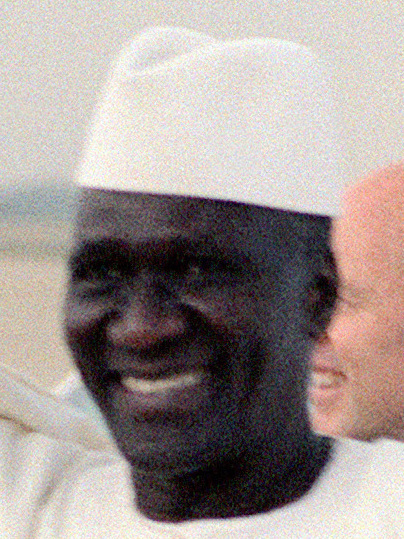
	First party	Second party
	Ind
Candidate	Diawadou Barry	Ahmed Sékou Touré
Party	Independent	PDG-RDA
Popular vote	145,497	85,808
Percentage	57.12%	33.69%
MP before election
Yacine Diallo
SFIO
Elected MP
Diawadou Barry
Independent

A by-election for one of the French National Assembly seats from Guinea was held on June 27, 1954. The socialist Yaciné Diallo, who had won one of the three Guinean seats in the 1951 French National Assembly election, died in April 1954, after which the by-election was called. The election was won by Diawadou Barry, but it also marked the ascent of Sékou Touré's Democratic Party of Guinea (PDG) in Guinean politics. The election was marred with irregularities and reportedly rigged by France to favor Barry and prevent Sékou Touré from winning.

== Candidates ==
There were three main candidates taking part in the election; Barry Diawadou, Sékou Touré and Ibrahima Barry ('Barry III') of the newly founded Socialist Democracy of Guinea (DSG). Barry Diawadou was supported by a coordination committee of local formations during the run-up to the election. The coordination committee based on an agreement between the Fula (French: Peul; Fula: Fulɓe) chiefs of Futa Jalon and regional formations in lower Guinea. Under the arrangement, the Fula chiefs would be able to select the candidate for the French National Assembly seat, whilst the groups from lower Guinea would select candidates for second-college senator (Fodé Mamadou Touré) and French Union assemblyman (Karim Bangoura). The Fula chiefs' candidate became Barry Diawadou, after Diawadou had received the backing of the Futa Jalon spiritual leader almami Ibrahima Sory Dara. Diawadou himself was the son of the almami of Dabola.

Sékou Touré (later the president of Guinea 1958-1984) was the candidate of the PDG, the Guinean branch of the African Democratic Rally (RDA). Touré was a prominent trade union leader. Touré and his party were popularly referred to as syli (susu for 'elephant'), a name given to symbolize strength.

== Conduct ==
The election was marred with irregularities. The principle of secrecy of vote was not respected. In many cases local chiefs were in charge of distributing voting cards, chiefs who simultaneously were campaigning for Barry Diawadou (the electoral law demanded that local committees be formed with representatives of all parties for the sake of distributing voting cards). On many occasions, the ballot for Barry Diawadou was attached to the voting cards. At the voting stations, PDG representatives were chased away or physically abused in many locations. With the PDG representatives gone, the fraud could go on without limitations. The irregularities were most widespread in Futa Jalon, the stronghold of Barry Diawadou.

The French minister Robert Buron admitted in 1968 that the election had been rigged by France to prevent Sékou Touré from winning.

== Results ==
Candidate	Party	Votes	%
Barry Diawadou	Independent	145,497	57.12
Sékou Touré	Democratic Party of Guinea	85,808	33.69
Barry III	DSG–SFIO	7,985	3.13
Four other candidates		15,432	6.06
Total		254,722	100.00
Valid votes		254,722	99.00
Invalid/blank votes		2,574	1.00
Total votes		257,296	100.00
Registered voters/turnout		466,666	55.13
Source: Schmidt, Sternberger et al.

== Aftermath ==
Immediately after the official results had been declared, the PDG cried foul and accused the French administration of having committed fraud to ensure the victory of Barry Diawadou. In the months following the vote, the PDG pinned its hopes to the possibility that the French National Assembly might refuse to validate the results. The party campaigned vigorously to show its force, and mass demonstrations were held throughout Guinea to condemn the electoral fraud. PDG followers composed various songs, sung at the public meetings. The stated that the Syli had been robbed of his legitimate victory, and that Barry Diawadou was a weak coward. Moreover, at the SFIO congress in July 1954 the actions of the French governor in Guinea were condemned. The SFIO congress charged that the governor had openly supported Diawadou's candidacy, in breach of the expected neutrality of the administration.

Following the election, the committee that had supported Barry Diawadou's candidacy formed the African Bloc of Guinea (BAG) in late 1954.

On January 21, 1955 a vote of validation was held in the French National Assembly regarding the 1954 election in Guinea. SFIO no longer voiced any opposition. Many of the Democratic and Socialist Union of the Resistance (the parliamentary ally of RDA) assembly members were absent at the time of the vote. The validation was passed with a wide majority; only the assembly members of the French Communist Party and RDA voted against the validation.

After the validation had passed, the situation became tense in lower Guinea. When Barry Diawadou's father visited Conakry on January 30, 1955, widespread riots broke out. Violent incidents also occurred in Dubréka and Boffa. These confrontations occurred in spite of appeals of the PDG to its followers to remain calm.
