= 1951 French legislative election in Algeria =

Elections to the National Assembly of France were held in Algeria on 17 June 1951. Algeria had 30 of the 625 at the National Assembly.

These legislative elections were the last ones organized in Algeria under the Fourth Republic, in 1956 it was deemed impossible to organize elections in the midst of the Algerian War. The last French legislative elections organized in Algeria before independence were held in 1958.

== Electoral system ==
As for the Algerian Assembly elected in 1948 and for the previous French legislative elections in 1945 and 1946, there were two electoral colleges, which each elected 15 deputies; one for the 1.5 million French citizens who were subject to French civil law (mainly people of European descent, plus those Algerian Jews who had been granted citizenship under the Crémieux Decree, and a few thousand Algerian Muslims who had been granted this status at their request when they became subject to French civil law), and another one for the millions of people who before 1946 had the civil status of indigénat. This was a legal status, and could not be changed simply by religious conversion. In 1946 the Lamine Guèye law had given equal French citizenship and voting rights to the second group, subject to their voting in the second college, and with the right to vote of women citizens to be organised by the Algerian Assembly. However, the Assembly never started to discuss the matter.

== Results ==
The Second College elections, like the Algerian Assembly election of 1948, were rigged by the colonial administration to the detriment of the three anticolonial parties, the Movement for the Triumph of Democratic Liberties, the Democratic Union of the Algerian Manifesto and the Algerian Communist Party. The last one got two deputies in the European College, one in Alger and one in Oran.

Party	First College			Second College			Total seats
Party	Votes	%	Seats	Votes	%	Seats	Total seats
List of Concord and Understanding				231,928	25.37	5	5
Democratic List of Franco-Muslim Independence				154,385	16.89	3	3
Progressive Independents				153,764	16.82	2	2
Republican Independents				109,583	11.99	3	3
Democratic Union of the Algerian Manifesto				81,977	8.97	0	0
Communists–Democratic Union for Progress and Freedom	77,609	21.03	2				2
Movement for the Triumph of Democratic Liberties				76,828	8.40	0	0
Union of Independents–RPF	72,202	19.56	4				4
Rally of the French People	44,873	12.16	2				2
Republican Union	1,684	0.46	0	37,086	4.06	1	1
French Section of the Workers' International	37,726	10.22	1				1
Republican Union–Rally of Republican Lefts	31,942	8.65	2				2
Democratic Union				31,892	3.49	1	1
National Union and Independent Republicans	31,067	8.42	1				1
Algerian Union	29,518	8.00	1				1
Algerian Communist Party				26,890	2.94	0	0
Independents, Peasants, National Republicans–RS	16,548	4.48	1				1
Independent French	14,544	3.94	1				1
Union of Republican Independents and Social Progress				9,542	1.04	0	0
National Group of Republican Democrats–MRP	6,583	1.78	0				0
Rally for Independent French	1,342	0.36	0				0
Rally of Algerian Population	761	0.21	0				0
Others	2,713	0.74	0	392	0.04	–	0
Independents				12	0.00	0	0
Total	369,112	100.00	15	914,279	100.00	15	30
Valid votes	369,112	98.07		914,279	99.39		
Invalid/blank votes	7,265	1.93		5,588	0.61		
Total votes	376,377	100.00		919,867	100.00		
Registered voters/turnout	540,348	69.65		1,406,882	65.38		
Source: Sternberger et al.

=== Alger ===
Party	First college			Second college			Total seats
Party	Votes	%	Seats	Votes	%	Seats	Total seats
Union algérienne	29,727		1	-	-	0	1
Union list of Independents and of the Rally of the French People	72,132	47.2%	4	-	-	0	4
Movement for the Triumph of Democratic Liberties	-	-	0	31,225	10.6%	0	0
Democratic Union of the Algerian Manifesto	-	-	0	13,204	4.5%	0	0
French Section of the Workers' International			0			0	
Liste communiste et d'union démocratique (Algerian Communist Party)	31,714	20.7%	1			0	1
Concorde et entente républicaine	-	-	-	231,769		5	5
Total	153,017		6	295,640		5	11
Registered voters	228,101	-	-	453,075	-	-	-
Sources: Biographies of former deputies, website of the French National Assembly

First College

- Adolphe Aumeran (1887–1980) Union algérienne (Républicains indépendants)
- Georges Blachette (1900–1980) Union list of Independents and of the Rally of the French People (Républicains indépendants)
- Paulin Colonna d'Istria (1905–1982) Union list of Independents and of the Rally of the French People (Rally of the French People) until 27 November 1951
  - replaced by Jacques Chevallier Républicains indépendants from 27 January 1952
- Pierre Fayet (1887–1977) Algerian Communist Party
- Marcel Paternot (1912–1993) Union list of Independents and of the Rally of the French People (Républicains indépendants)
- Marcel Ribère (1900–1966) Union list of Independents and of the Rally of the French People (Rally of the French People)

Second College

- Ahmed Aït-Ali (1886–1962) Popular Republican Movement (elected on the Concorde et entente républicaine list)
- Abderrahmane Bentounès (1913–2010) (French Section of the Workers' International in 1946–51) Centre républicain d'action paysanne et sociale et des démocrates indépendants (elected on the Concorde et entente républicaine list)
- Ali Ben Lakhdar Brahimi (1911–1976) French Section of the Workers' International (elected on the Concorde et entente républicaine list)
- Menouar Saïah (1905–1982) (former senator, 1948–1951) Radical Party (elected on the Concorde et entente républicaine list)
- Amar Smaïl (1901–1967) Radical Party (elected on the Concorde et entente républicaine list)

=== Constantine ===
==== First College ====
List	Votes	%	Seats
liste d'Union républicaine et de Rassemblement des gauches républicaines René Mayer; Paul Pantaloni	31,942	39%	2
liste de Rassemblement des gauches républicaines (RGR) et indépendants français Jules Valle		17.7%	1
Rally of the French People; Léon Haumesser	14,284	17.4%	1
Rassemblement des populations algériennes			0
Total	81,959	100%	4

- Léon Haumesser (1903–1991) Rally of the French People
- René Mayer (1895–1972) (Minister of Justice) Radical Party (elected on the Rally of Republican Lefts list)
- Paul Pantaloni (1884–1973) Républicains indépendants
- Jules Valle (1894–1965) (Senator 1948–1951) Français indépendants

==== Second College ====
Party	First district			Second district			Third district			Total seats
Party	Votes	%	Seats	Votes	%	Seats	Votes	%	Seats	Total seats
Indépendants progressistes	153,729	91,7%	2	-	-	-	-	-	-	2
Républicains indépendants	-	-	-	109,731	74.5%	3	-	-	-	3
Union démocratique (MRP)	-	-	-	-		-		31%	1	1
Union républicaine (RGR)	-	-	-	-	-	-		36%	1	1
Movement for the Triumph of Democratic Liberties			0			0			0	0
Democratic Union of the Algerian Manifesto			0			0	27,552	26,6%	0	0
Total	167,632	100%	2	147,232	100%	3	103,411	100%	2	7
Registered voters		-	-	219,809	-	-	183,507	-	-	-
Sources: Biographies of former deputies, website of the French National Assembly

First district

- Mohamed Bengana (1914–1996) Radical Party
- Abdelkader Cadi (1904–1955) Democratic and Socialist Union of the Resistance (deceased on 2 January 1955)
  - replaced through a by-election on 13 March 1955 by his brother Ali Cadi (1899–1963) Democratic and Socialist Union of the Resistance (resigns on 8 November 1955)

Second district

- Mostefa Benbahmed (1899–1978) French Section of the Workers' International
- Mohamed Salah Bendjelloul (1893–1985) Rally of the French People - ARS
- Youcef Kessous (1894–1952) Républicains indépendants (deceased on 1 June 1952)
  - replaced on 13 July 1952 through a by-election (elected with 86% of the votes) by Amar Naroun (1906–1988) Républicains indépendants

Third district

- Allaoua Ben Aly Chérif (1895–1976) Popular Republican Movement
- Abdelmadjid Ourabah (1905–1967) (Senator 1946–1951) Radical Party

=== Oran ===
Party	First college			Second college			Total seats
Party	Votes	%	Seats	Votes	%	Seats	Total seats
Liste de réconciliation républicaine et de sauvegarde de l'Algérie française (Independents and Radicals)		12.3%	1			0	1
Rally of the French People	32,385	22.8%	1			0	1
Rally of Republican Lefts			0			0	0
List of Republican Democrats (Popular Republican Movement)			0			0	0
Movement for the Triumph of Democratic Liberties			0			0	0
Democratic Union of the Algerian Manifesto			0			0	0
French Section of the Workers' International			1			0	1
Liste communiste et d'union démocratique (Algerian Communist Party)	134,136	26,5%	1			0	1
Liste démocratique indépendante d'Union franco-musulmane	-	-	-	154,385	77%	3	3
Centre républicain d'action paysanne et sociale et des démocrates indépendants	23,210	17.3%	1			0	1
Total	134,136	100%	5	200,364	100%	3	8
Registered voters	198,098						
Sources: Biographies of former deputies, website of the French National Assembly

First College

- Henri Fouques-Duparc (1903–1976) (senator in 1948–1951) Rally of the French People
- François Quilici (1905–1977) Républicains indépendants
- Maurice Rabier (1907–1999) French Section of the Workers' International
- Roger de Saivre (1908–1964) Centre républicain d'action paysanne et sociale et des démocrates indépendants
- Alice Sportisse Gomez-Nadal (1909–1996) Algerian Communist Party

Second College

- Djilali Hakiki (1907–1962) Radical Party
- Ahmed Mekki-Bezzeghoud (1883–1953) Radical Party (deceased on 23 July 1953)
  - replaced by Chérif Sid Cara (1902–1999) (Senator in 1946–1953, Secretary of State in 1957–1958) Radical Party at a by-election on 20 September 1953
- Djelloul Ould Kadi (1920–2000) Democratic and Socialist Union of the Resistance

== See also ==
- 1951 French legislative election
- French legislative election, 1951 (Guinea)
- (on the Wikipedia in French) Liste des députés de l'Algérie française
