= Franco-Guinean Union =

Political party in Guinea

The Franco-Guinean Union (French: Union franco-guinéenne, abbreviated UFG) was a political party in Guinea. The party was founded in February 1947. The organization functioned as a Conakry-based coordination committee of the different ethnic-based interests that supported Yacine Diallo. Its main backers were chiefs from the Futa Jallon. The party was linked to the French Section of the Workers' International (SFIO).

UFG was during its entire existence a rival of the African Democratic Rally (RDA). Diallo supported French colonial rule in Guinea.

In the 1951 National Assembly election, the UFG (along with SFIO) supported two candidates, Yacine Diallo and Albert Liurette.

UFG disintegrated after Diallo's death.
