= 1956 French legislative election in Guinea =

Elections to the French National Assembly were held Guinea on 2 January 1956, as part of the wider French elections. The Democratic Party of Guinea – African Democratic Rally won two of the three seats (taken by Ahmed Sékou Touré and Saifoulaye Diallo) with the African Bloc of Guinea winning the other seat (Barry Diawadou).

== Results ==
Party	Votes	%	Seats
Democratic Party of Guinea	346,716	61.70	2
African Bloc of Guinea	146,543	26.08	1
DSG–SFIO	55,385	9.86	0
Forest Independent List of Social and Economic Action	13,303	2.37	0
Total	561,947	100.00	3
Valid votes	561,947	98.93	
Invalid/blank votes	6,075	1.07	
Total votes	568,022	100.00	
Registered voters/turnout	975,119	58.25	
Source: Sternberger et al., De Benoist
