= Guinean Progressive Union =

Political party in Guinea

The Guinean Progressive Union (French: Union progressiste guinéenne, abbreviated UPG-PRA) was a political party in Guinea. The party was founded in April 1958 through the merger of Socialist Democracy of Guinea (DSG, the Guinean branch of the African Socialist Movement) and the African Bloc of Guinea (BAG). It was the Guinean branch of the African Regroupment Party (PRA).

The party was dominated by Western-educated Fulas (French: Peuls; Fula: Fulɓe), such as Barry Diawadou, Barry III and Abdoulaye Diallo. Whilst BAG, one of the founding parties of the UPG-PRA, had represented the more conservative political sector in Guinea, the new UPG-PRA tried to challenge the dominant African Democratic Rally (RDA) from its left. The UPG-PRA congress in Mamou called for a 'No' vote in the 1958 referendum on Guinea joining the French Community. After the referendum and the subsequent independence of Guinea, UPG-PRA was merged into the RDA in late 1958.
