= Aminata Touré (Guinean politician) =

Guinean politician (1952–2022)

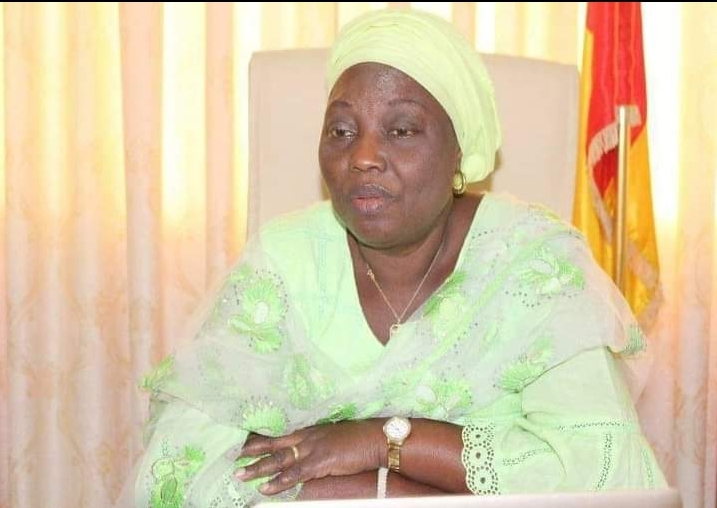

Mayor of Kaloum
- In office 4 February 2018 – 12 January 2022

Personal details
- Born: 12 December 1952 Conakry, French Guinea, French West Africa, France
- Died: 12 January 2022 (aged 69) Morocco
- Party: PDG; Kaloum Yigui

Aminata Touré (12 December 1952 – 12 January 2022) was a Guinean politician. She served as mayor of Kaloum from 2018 until her death in 2022.

== Childhood and Education ==
When interviewed by a journalist (Mamadi Kansan Doumbouya) about her childhood and Education, during which time she remained the mayor of Kaloum: Aminata revealed that her father never allowed them to compromise as the children of other presidents because he couldn't do the same for the poor people. She said her father sent them to Conakry to continue their education in the country, to be raised among the poor and so they will speak most of the national languages.

She completed her primary school in Labé, Beyla, Kindia and then came back to complete her baccalaureate in Labé. When Minata got into university and was among the top 10 to be awarded scholarships, Sékou crossed her name, saying that they would be given to children of the poor. When Minata arrived at Gamal Abdel Nasser University in Conakry, she begged her father to give her a car to take her to class. Touré refused to do so, saying he could not do the same for the children of the poor, who lived off their labor, while he lived on public funds. She used to hide the old car given to her by the authorities from the President. She explained to her father that she had gone to Belgium after marriage and wanted to study at a university there, but he did not agree.

Aminata revealed that the 30 servant who worked in the palace were not allowed by Touré to do their jobs. She did all the work herself, and the cooking part was arranged between them. One day, she slapped one of her friends as she's a daughter of the president, and her father told her to hold onto the boy and slapped her back.

== Life and career ==
Aminata was the daughter of former President Ahmed Sékou Touré and his wife, Marguéritte Colle. She attended school in Conakry with her brother, Mohamed. After the 1984 Guinean coup d'état and her father's death, she sought refuge in Morocco and worked as an entrepreneur. In 2018, she relaunched herself into politics with the party Kaloum Yigui.

Early in her life, Touré was an activist within her father's party, the Democratic Party of Guinea. However, she moved away from political life while in exile in Morocco. Upon her return, she founded the party Kaloum Yigui. She was elected mayor of Kaloum on 4 February 2018, receiving a unanimous vote from each of the commune's 29 councilors. The governor of the Conakry Region, Mathurin Bangoura, launched a massive sanitation campaign. Touré's administration benefited from the campaign and aided a successful garbage collection drive. Her victory was seen as a blow to Guinea's ruling party, the Rally of the Guinean People, in the strategic commune in the Conakry Region.

Touré was a strong advocate for the ideals of her father, saying that "President Ahmed Sékou Touré was the father of all Guinean youth. It is true that we are his children but he considered all Guinean youth as his children. So the priority was not us, but the priority was all the young people of Guinea. He was an affable father, an understanding father who listened to his children and who, as usual, listened to everyone". She was outspoken about the misdeeds of France throughout the colonial regime of French Guinea and the French Republic's actions during the African nation's drive for independence.

She died in Morocco following a long illness, on 12 January 2022, at the age of 69.
