= Youth of the African Democratic Revolution =

Guinean political group

The Youth of the African Democratic Revolution (French: Jeunesse de la révolution démocratique africaine, abbreviated JRDA) was the sole national youth organization in Guinea from 1959 to 1984. It was the youth wing of the Democratic Party of Guinea (PDG).

== History ==
The founding congress of JRDA was held in Conakry on March 26, 1959. JRDA became the youth wing of the Democratic Party of Guinea (PDG), and the PDG party leadership declared JRDA as the sole national youth institution. Following the launching of JRDA, all Guinean youth aged 7 to 35 years old belonged statutorily in the JRDA.

At the helm of JRDA was its National Committee (CN-JRDA), with thirteen members. Candidates for leadership roles in JRDA were expected to have spent time in local, district and school-based organizations of JRDA. People obtaining posts within the JRDA were prepared for leadership functions in the governing PDG. The national directorate of JRDA published the monthly magazine Fonikee ('Youth' in Malinke and Susu languages).

The PDG tasked JRDA to actively participate in national construction and demonstrate revolutionary initiative in order to achieve economic independence as quickly as possible, to revive national culture and art - to prepare for and implement a genuine cultural revolution, beginning with the universal eradication of illiteracy among the masses of Guinea and to give sport a national significance and to engage the broadest possible segments of Guinean youth in various sports. JRDA opeated popular militas (Milices Populaires), and JRDA squads conducted patrols to uphold revolutionary morale, intervening at hotels and dance halls to combat prostitution and capitalist music, manners and dress.

JRDA, acting upon PDG instructions, controlled performing arts sectors in the country, and strove to eliminate French and European cultural influences. It organized dance groups, musical groups and sports teams across the country. Children aged 7 to 15 years were organized into a pioneer movement, the National Pioneer Movement of Guinea (Mouvement national des pionniers de Guinée, MNPG) - a special component of JRDA. MNPG members were trained to participate as ceremonial guards and glee troupes at PDG events. JRDA also operated Revolutionary Education Centres (Centres d'éducation révolutionnaire, CER), and conducted anti-illiteracy campaigns.

The Fourth JRDA Congress was held in September 1966, which focused on role of youth in national reconstruction. Addressing the congress, President Ahmed Sékou Touré argued that "[t]he JRDA must educate a new Guinean man, a new African man. This goal will be achieved if Guinean youth produces a new peasant, a new student, a new worker, united by revolutionary consciousness and a sense of historical responsibility." PDG called on JRDA to organize volunteers for construction projecs (for schools, hospitals, clinics, roads, etc.).

JRDA was promptly dissolved by the CMRN military junta that took power in April 1984.
