= 1958 Guinean constitutional referendum =

Referendum rejecting joining the French Community

A constitutional referendum was held in Guinea on 28 September 1958 as part of a wider referendum across the French Union (and France itself) on whether to adopt the new French Constitution. If the territory voted to accept the new constitution, it would then have four months to decide whether to

1. Preserve the status of overseas territory.
2. Become a state of the French Community.
3. Become an overseas department (part of the French Republic).

Alongside Niger, Guinea was one of only two territories where the major political party campaigned for a "no" vote, and ultimately was the only territory to reject the constitution and opt for independence. The Democratic Party of Guinea, which had won all but four seats in the Territorial Assembly election the previous year under the leadership of Ahmed Sékou Touré, pushed for a rejection of the constitution, and on 19 October the party severed its ties with the African Democratic Rally, whose other members were in favour of retaining ties with France.

The results showed that more than 95% of voters in Guinea voted against the constitution, with a turnout of 85.5%.

== Results ==
"Yes" vote for the 1958 French Constitutional Referendum as held in Guinea

"No" vote for the 1958 French Constitutional Referendum as held in Guinea

| Choice | Votes | % |
|---|---|---|
| For | 56,981 | 4.78 |
| Against | 1,136,324 | 95.22 |
| Total | 1,193,305 | 100.00 |
| Valid votes | 1,193,305 | 99.12 |
| Invalid/blank votes | 10,570 | 0.88 |
| Total votes | 1,203,875 | 100.00 |
| Registered voters/turnout | 1,408,500 | 85.47 |
Source: Sternberger et al.

== Aftermath ==
Following the referendum, Guinea declared independence on 2 October. The French government reacted badly to the result, and although Touré had not been seeking it, withdrew totally from the country and halted any development assistance.

Touré initially attempted to maintain relations with France, stating a desire to remain in the franc zone and assuring businesses in Guinea of continued international openness to Guinea's significant mineral, agriculture, and hydro-electric resources. However, relations between the newly independent Guinea and France almost immediately became strained. French colonialists in Guinea withdrew from the country as quickly as they could, destroying as much infrastructure as they could in retribution. The Washington Post reported that "as a warning to other French-speaking territories, the French pulled out of Guinea over a two-month period, taking everything they could with them. They unscrewed light bulbs, removed plans for sewage pipelines in Conakry, the capital, and even burned medicines rather than leave them for the Guineans."

As a result, the Guinean government turned to the Communist bloc to request aid, a step which the French government used in pressuring Western countries not to accept the Guinean independence. Upon independence Touré assumed the office of President, and the country soon became a one-party state. Despite various assassination attempts and coup plots, Touré ruled until his death in 1984.
