= June 1946 French legislative election in Guinea =

Elections to the French National Assembly were held in Guinea on 2 June 1946.

== Electoral system ==
The two seats allocated to the constituency were elected on two separate electoral rolls; French citizens elected one MP from the first college, whilst non-citizens elected one MP in the second college.

== Results ==
=== First College ===
Candidate	Votes	%
Jean Ferracci	720	54.55
Guignouard	355	26.89
Rouvin	126	9.55
Giacomini	50	3.79
Bardy	27	2.05
Salles	18	1.36
Meunier	4	0.30
Six other candidates	20	1.52
Total	1,320	100.00
Valid votes	1,320	98.36
Invalid/blank votes	22	1.64
Total votes	1,342	100.00
Registered voters/turnout	2,545	52.73
Source: De Benoist

=== Second College ===
Candidate	Votes	%
Yacine Diallo	10,100	54.81
Mamba Sano	5,170	28.06
Ibrahime Kaba Lamine	3,071	16.66
Amara Sissoko	39	0.21
Two other candidates	48	0.26
Total	18,428	100.00
Valid votes	18,428	99.65
Invalid/blank votes	64	0.35
Total votes	18,492	100.00
Registered voters/turnout	22,551	82.00
Source: De Benoist
