= 1951 French legislative election in Guinea =

Elections to the French National Assembly were held in Guinea on 17 June 1951. The number of seats Guinea had in the Assembly had increased from two to three. Suffrage was also extended, with the number of registered voters increasing from 131,309 in the 1946 election to 393,628 in 1951, although voter turnout decreased from 73% to 57%.

The Socialist List of the Guinean Union won two seats (Yacine Diallo and Albert Liurette) with the Guinean Agreement winning the other (Mamba Sano).

== Results ==
Party	Votes	%	Seats
Socialist List of the Guinean Union	67,640	30.43	2
List of Independents	48,246	21.71	1
Democratic Union of Workers and Veterans	31,976	14.39	0
Guinean Union	29,462	13.25	0
French Union of Social and Democratic Action	20,461	9.21	0
Rally of the French People	17,901	8.05	0
Social and Economic Action	4,475	2.01	0
Independence of the Outre-mer	2,116	0.95	0
Total	222,277	100.00	3
Valid votes	222,277	99.15	
Invalid/blank votes	1,905	0.85	
Total votes	224,182	100.00	
Registered voters/turnout	393,628	56.95	
Source: De Benoist
