= November 1946 French legislative election in Guinea =

Elections to the French National Assembly were held Guinea on 10 November 1946, as part of the wider French elections. The territory elected two members to the Assembly. The Socialist and Progressive Union and the Socialist Party won one seat each, taken by Yacine Diallo and Mamba Sano respectively.

== Results ==
Party	Votes	%	Seats
Socialist and Progressive Union	60,516	63.35	1
Socialist Party	30,993	32.45	1
African Democratic Union	3,421	3.58	0
Republican Party of the Left	591	0.62	0
Total	95,521	100.00	2
Valid votes	95,521	99.40	
Invalid/blank votes	581	0.60	
Total votes	96,102	100.00	
Registered voters/turnout	131,309	73.19	
Source: De Benoist
