= Diarra Traoré =

Guinean soldier and politician (1935–1985)

Prime Minister of Guinea
- In office 5 April 1984 – 28 December 1984
- President: Lansana Conté
- Preceded by: Louis Lansana Beavogui
- Succeeded by: Sidya Touré

Personal details
- Born: 1935 Kankan
- Died: 8 July 1985 (aged 49–50) Kindia Central Prison
- Party: Democratic Party of Guinea – African Democratic Rally

Military service
- Allegiance: Guinea
- Rank: Lieutenant colonel

Diarra Traoré (1935 – 8 July 1985) was a Guinean soldier and politician. He served as Prime Minister of Guinea briefly in 1984 as a member of a junta led by Lansana Conté. In 1985, after Traoré attempted a coup d'état against President Conté, Conté had him executed.

== Career ==
Traoré received his military training at the French school in Fréjus. After Guinea gained its independence in 1958, he was first given command of the garrison at Koundara, then the Futa Jalon region. However, President Ahmed Sékou Touré did not trust him, so he was discharged from the military.

Traoré became a regional governor, being moved around regularly to various postings. In the late 1970s, he joined the Democratic Party of Guinea (Parti Démocratique de Guinée, PDG).

At the death of Ahmed Sékou Touré in March 1984, on 3 April, Traoré supported a coup d'état led by Lieutenant Colonel Lansana Conté. The coup ousted interim President Louis Lansana Beavogui and the PDG. Conté made himself President and appointed Traoré Prime Minister. Conté, Traoré and others governed as the Military Committee of National Restoration.

A few months later, however, Conté demoted Traoré to Minister of State for National Education. On 4 July 1985, Traoré attempted to overthrow Conté, who was attending a summit in Togo, but was quickly thwarted by loyal troops. Traoré went into hiding, but Conté's forces swiftly captured him and showed him on television being brutally assaulted. Traoré and about one hundred other military personnel, many of them also ethnic Malinké like Traoré, were executed.

== See also ==
- List of heads of government of Guinea
- Politics of Guinea

Political offices
| Preceded by Louis Lansana Beavogui | Prime Minister of Guinea; 1984 | Succeeded by Post abolished |
