= 1961 Guinean presidential election =

- 15 January 1961
- Turnout: 99.38%
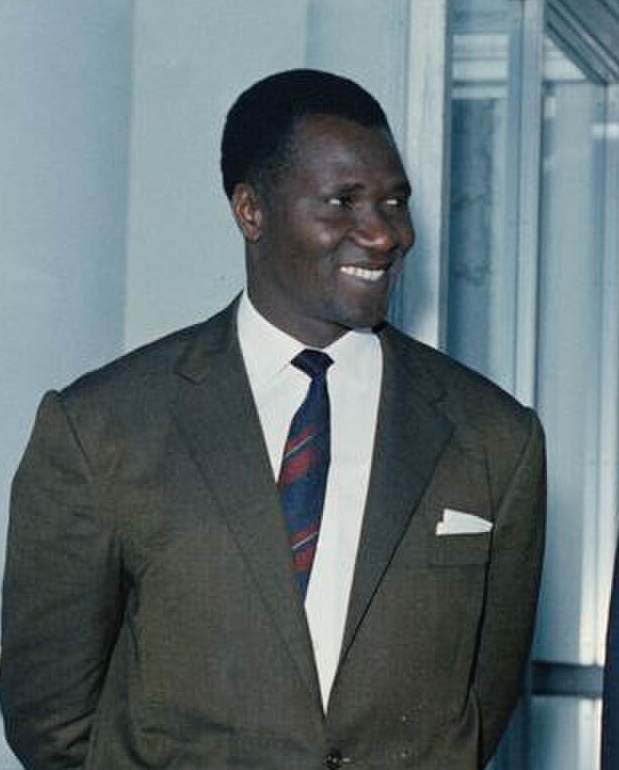
Nominee	Ahmed Sékou Touré
Party	PDG-RDA
Popular vote	1,576,580
Percentage	100%
President before election
Ahmed Sékou Touré
PDG-RDA
Elected President
Ahmed Sékou Touré
PDG-RDA

Presidential elections were held in Guinea for the first time on 15 January 1961. Incumbent Ahmed Sékou Touré, who had automatically become President when the country gained independence in 1958, was the only candidate (as the country as a one-party state with his Democratic Party of Guinea as the sole legal party at the time), and was re-elected unopposed.

== Results ==
Candidate	Party	Votes	%
Ahmed Sekou Touré	Democratic Party of Guinea	1,576,580	100.00
Total		1,576,580	100.00
Valid votes		1,576,580	99.99
Invalid/blank votes		167	0.01
Total votes		1,576,747	100.00
Registered voters/turnout		1,586,544	99.38
Source: Sternberger et al.
