= Guinean Entertainment Agency =

Government agency

The Guinean Entertainment Agency (French: Agence Guinéenne de Spectacles) (AGS) was a government entertainment agency in Guinea.It was established in May 1973 to replace the former Syliart. It was run by the Ministry of Youth, Arts and Sports and supported artists and playwrights in Guinea as well as providing a pension to those who works were in accordance with the Democratic Party of Guinea.
