= Association of Guineans in France =

The Association of Guineans in France (French: Association des Guinéens en France) was one of two opposition groups from Guinea in exile in France during the regime of Sékou Touré. Like its counterpart, the Front for the National Liberation of Guinea, the association was composed of mainly exiled cabinet ministers and university graduates, discontent with Touré's regime.
