= 1974 Guinean general election =

- 27 December 1974

General elections were held in Guinea on 27 December 1974 to elect a President and National Assembly. The country was a one-party state at the time, with the Democratic Party of Guinea – African Democratic Rally as the sole legal party. Its leader Ahmed Sékou Touré was re-elected President unopposed, whilst in the National Assembly elections the party produced a list of 150 candidates for the 150 seats (increased from 75). It was ultimately approved by 100% of voters with turnout reported to be 99.7%.

== Results ==
=== President ===
| Candidate | Party | Votes | % |
|---|---|---|---|
| Ahmed Sékou Touré | Democratic Party of Guinea | 2,432,129 | 100.00 |
| Total | | 2,432,129 | 100.00 |
| Registered voters/turnout | | 2,436,485 | – |
Source: Nohlen et al.

=== National Assembly ===
| Party | Votes | % | Seats | +/– |
|---|---|---|---|---|
| Democratic Party of Guinea | 2,432,129 | 100.00 | 150 | +75 |
| Total | 2,432,129 | 100.00 | 150 | +75 |
| Registered voters/turnout | 2,436,487 | – | | |
Source: Nohlen et al., IPU
