= Facinet Touré =

Guinean politician (1934–2021)

Facinet Touré (11 June 1934 – 14 June 2021) was a Guinean military officer, and politician who served as Minister of Foreign Affairs. From 1984 to 1991, he was a co-founder of the Military Committee of National Restoration, which took power in a coup d'état on 3 April 1984.
