= PDAG =

PDAG may refer to:

- Propositional directed acyclic graph, a data structure in computer science
- African Democratic Party of Guinea (French: Parti démocratique africain de Guinée)
- Palladium silver (PdAg) ceramic, used in a methanol reformer
- Philadelphia Direct Action Group, part of the Direct Action Network
- pDAG, a component algorithm in a de novo peptide sequencing tool
