= 1951 French legislative election in Ivory Coast =

Elections to the French National Assembly were held in Ivory Coast on 17 June 1951 as part of the wider parliamentary elections. The African Democratic Rally (Félix Houphouët-Boigny) and French Union (Sékou Sanogo) each won a single seat.

== Results ==
| Party | Votes | % | Seats | +/– |
|---|---|---|---|---|
| African Democratic Rally | 67,090 | 61.17 | 1 | –1 |
| Party of the French Union of Ivory Coast | 35,376 | 32.25 | 1 | New |
| Republican Union | 5,881 | 5.36 | 0 | New |
| Eburnean Democratic Bloc | 1,334 | 1.22 | 0 | New |
| Party of the Democratic Union | 1 | 0.00 | 0 | New |
| Party of the Free Union | 0 | 0.00 | 0 | New |
| United Front of the West | 0 | 0.00 | 0 | New |
| Total | 109,682 | 100.00 | 2 | –1 |
| Valid votes | 109,682 | 98.57 | | |
| Invalid/blank votes | 1,595 | 1.43 | | |
| Total votes | 111,277 | 100.00 | | |
| Registered voters/turnout | 189,154 | 58.83 | | |
Source: De Benoist
