= 1968 Guinean general election =

- 1 January 1968
- Turnout: 99.69%
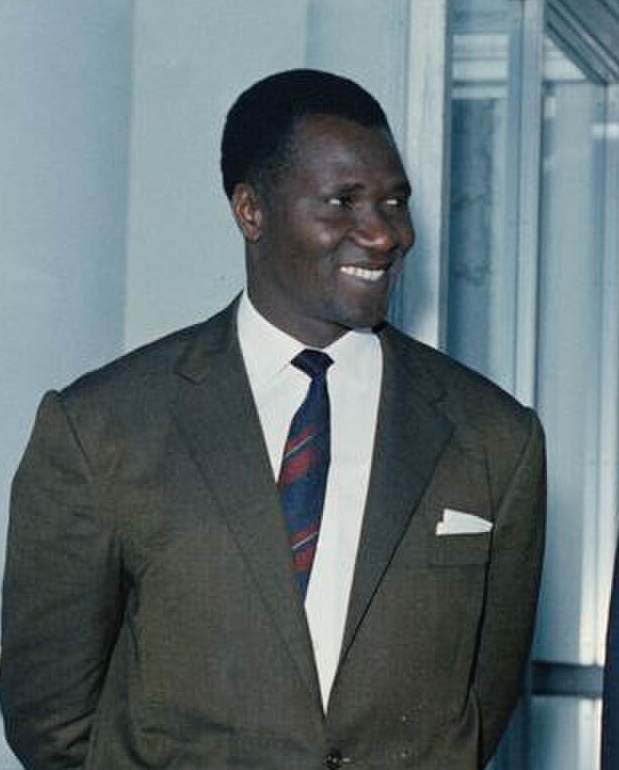
Nominee	Ahmed Sékou Touré
Party	PDG-RDA
Popular vote	1,990,726
Percentage	100%
President before election
Ahmed Sékou Touré
PDG-RDA
Elected President
Ahmed Sékou Touré
PDG-RDA

General elections were held in Guinea on 1 January 1968 to elect a President and National Assembly. The country was a one-party state at the time, with the Democratic Party of Guinea – African Democratic Rally as the sole legal party. Its leader Ahmed Sékou Touré was re-elected President unopposed, whilst in the National Assembly elections the party produced a list of 75 candidates for the 75 seats, which voters were asked to approve. Voter turnout was 99.7%.

== Results ==
=== President ===
Candidate	Party	Votes	%
Ahmed Sékou Touré	Democratic Party of Guinea	1,990,726	100.00
Total		1,990,726	100.00
Valid votes		1,990,726	99.99
Invalid/blank votes		103	0.01
Total votes		1,990,829	100.00
Registered voters/turnout		1,996,926	99.69
Source: Nohlen et al.

=== National Assembly ===
Party	Votes	%	Seats	+/–
Democratic Party of Guinea	1,990,726	100.00	75	0
Total	1,990,726	100.00	75	0
Valid votes	1,990,726	99.99		
Invalid/blank votes	103	0.01		
Total votes	1,990,829	100.00		
Registered voters/turnout	1,996,926	99.69		
Source: Nohlen et al.
