= Aminata Touré =

Aminata Touré may refer to:

- Aminata Touré (Senegalese politician) (born 1962), former Prime Minister of Senegal (2013–2014) and Justice Minister (2012–2013)
- Aminata Touré (German politician) (born 1992)
- Aminata Touré (Guinean politician) (1952–2022)
