= Barry III =

Guinean politician (1923–1971)

General Secretary of the PRA Guinean Branch
- In office April 1958 – November 1958
- Preceded by: Guinean Branch founded
- Succeeded by: PRA dissolved

General Secretary of the MSA
- In office 1957 – 26 March 1958
- Succeeded by: Merged into PRA

General Secretary of the DSG
- In office 1954 – April 1958
- Preceded by: Yaciné Diallo
- Succeeded by: DSG dissolved

Personal details
- Born: Ibrahima Barry; 1923 Bantiŋel, Pita, French West Africa
- Died: 25 January 1971 (aged 48) Conakry, Guinea
- Party: MSA
- Other political affiliations: DSG
- Education: École normale supérieure William Ponty
- Profession: Politician, Lawyer

Ibrahima Barry, popularly known as Barry III (1923 – January 25, 1971), was a Guinean politician. He was the leader of the political party Socialist Democracy of Guinea (DSG).

== Background ==
Barry was born in Bantiŋel, Pita, into an aristocratic family of the Seeriyaabhe clan. A graduate of École normale supérieure William Ponty, Barry became a lawyer in France. Barry counted on strong support from the people and administration in the Fouta Jallon region in northern Guinea. In particular, he represented the younger educated generation of the elite sectors of Fula society. Barry was also a freemason.

== Political career ==
Barry was the DSG candidate in the 1954 legislative by-election. He obtained 16,098 votes (6.3% of the vote in Guinea). Barry had taken over the position as the leader of the socialist movement after Yaciné Diallo (whose death had provoked the holding of the by-election in 1954), but Barry III's hostile discourse against the Fula traditional chiefs (who had supported Diallo) aliented large sections of former supporters of Diallo.

Ahead of the 1956 election, the Democratic Party of Guinea (PDG) offered Barry to be one of their three candidates for the legislative election (along with Sékou Touré). Barry III, however, rejected the offer.

In the same year, Barry III stood as candidate for mayor of Conakry (in which he was defeated by Sékou Touré).

In 1957, Barry became the general secretary of the African Socialist Movement (MSA).

In the first government of independent Guinea, Barry was included as a minister.

After the merger of DSG into the African Regroupment Party (PRA), Barry became the general secretary of the Guinean branch of PRA. In November 1958 the Guinean PRA was dissolved, and Barry III instructed his followers to join the PDG.

== Arrest and execution ==
Barry was arrested in December 1970. He was held prisoner at Camp Alpha Yahya. On January 25, 1971 in the purge that followed Operation Green Sea, he was hanged in public at Tombo Bridge in Conakry.

== Nickname ==
Barry III was sometimes nicknamed Syliyoré (Susu for "Little Elephant"), a reference to the similarities between his political programme and that of Sékou Touré (who was commonly nicknamed Syli, "Elephant").
