= 1951 French legislative election in French Somaliland =

Elections to the French National Assembly were held in French Somaliland on 17 June 1951 as part of the wider French parliamentary elections. Edmond Magendie was elected as the territory's MP, defeating the incumbent Jean-Carles Martine.

== Results ==
Candidate	Votes	%
Edmond Magendie	2,341	76.65
Jean-Carles Martine	513	16.80
Clarisse Hulman	200	6.55
Youssouf Daoud	0	0.00
Total	3,054	100.00
Valid votes	3,054	98.29
Invalid/blank votes	53	1.71
Total votes	3,107	100.00
Registered voters/turnout	5,208	59.66
Source: Sternberger et al.
