= 1957 Guinean Territorial Assembly election =

- 31 March 1957

All 60 seats in the Territorial Assembly
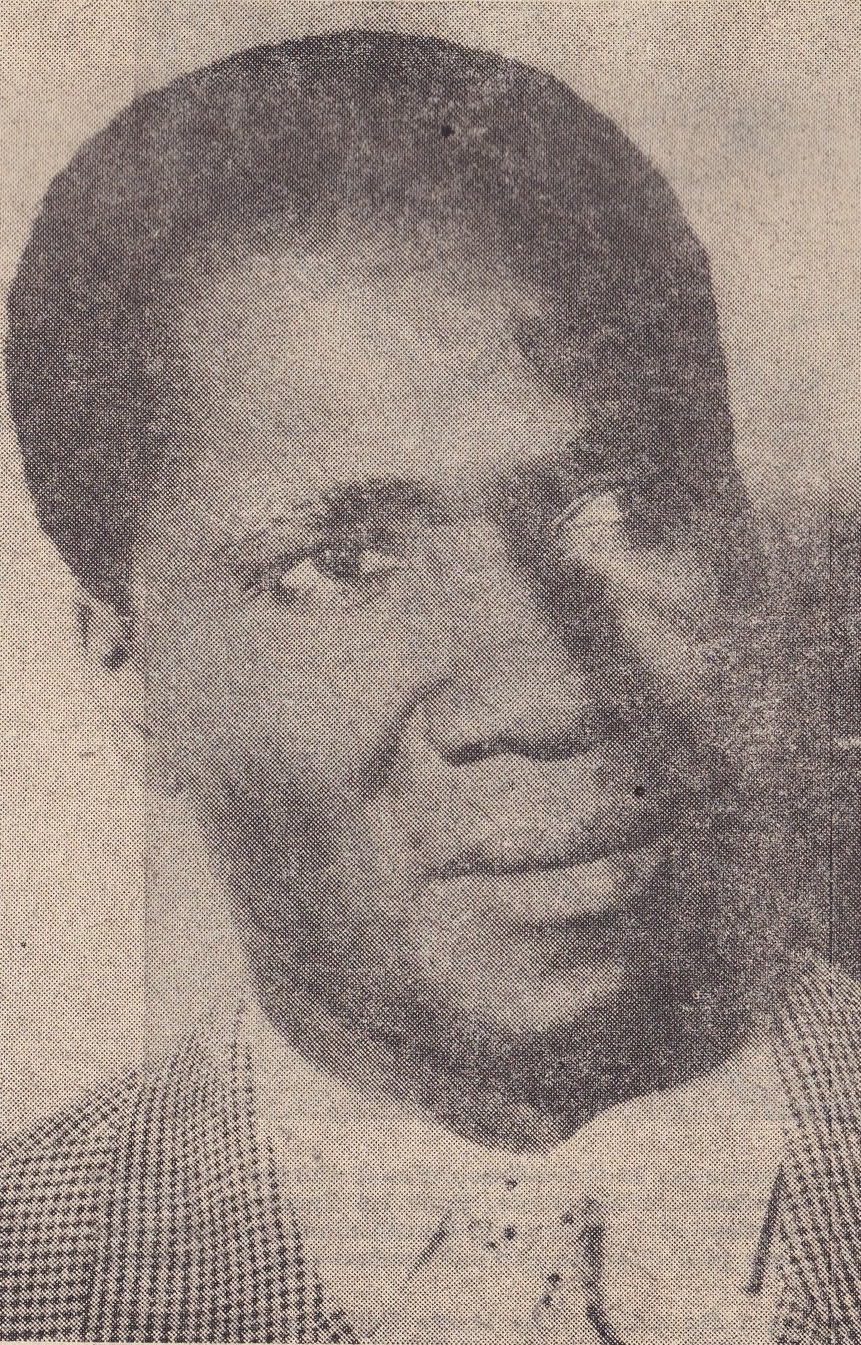

	First party	Second party
Leader	Ahmed Sékou Touré	Barry III
Party	PDG-RDA	DSG
Seats won	56	3
Popular vote	584,438	77,643
Percentage	77.39%	10.28%

Territorial Assembly elections were held in Guinea on 31 March 1957. The result was a victory for the Democratic Party of Guinea – African Democratic Rally, which won 56 of the 60 seats in the Assembly. Voter turnout was 60%.

== Results ==
Party	Votes	%	Seats
Democratic Party of Guinea	584,438	77.39	56
Socialist Democracy of Guinea	77,643	10.28	3
African Bloc of Guinea	45,489	6.02	0
Other parties	47,650	6.31	1
Total	755,220	100.00	60
Valid votes	755,220	98.62	
Invalid/blank votes	10,569	1.38	
Total votes	765,789	100.00	
Registered voters/turnout	1,270,847	60.26	
Source: Nohlen et al.
