= Louis Lansana Beavogui =

Guinean politician (1923–1984)

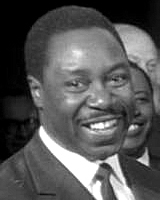
- Beavogui in 1964

President of Guinea Acting
- In office 26 March 1984 – 3 April 1984
- Prime Minister: Himself
- Preceded by: Ahmed Sékou Touré
- Succeeded by: Lansana Conté

Prime Minister of Guinea
- In office 26 April 1972 – 3 April 1984
- President: Ahmed Sékou Touré; Himself (Acting)
- Preceded by: Post established
- Succeeded by: Diarra Traoré

Personal details
- Born: 28 December 1923 Macenta, French Guinea (now Guinea)
- Died: 19 August 1984 (aged 60) Conakry, Guinea
- Cause of death: Diabetes mellitus
- Party: Democratic Party
- Spouse: Delphine Béavogui (?–1984; his death)

Louis Lansana Beavogui (N'Ko: ߟߊ߲߭ߛߌ߬ߣߍ߬ ߓߌߦߊߝ߭ߏߜ߭ߌ߫; 28 December 1923 – 19 August 1984) was a Guinean politician. He was Prime Minister from 1972 to 1984 and was briefly acting President in 1984.

== Background and political career ==
Beavogui, a member of the Toma ethnic group, was born in Macenta, located in southern Guinea. He was trained as a medical doctor at the School of Medicine and Pharmacy in the Senegalese city of Dakar to become a medic. He first worked as an assistant medical officer in Guéckédou and then as a medical officer in Kissidougou. His political career began in 1953 as a town councillor. He was elected as Mayor of Kissidougou when he was 31 years old in 1954, and elected to the National Assembly of France in January 1956 as one of three deputies representing French Guinea. Under President Ahmed Sékou Touré, Beavogui was appointed as Minister of Economic Affairs and Planning when Guinea gained its independence in 1958, and he was appointed Minister of Foreign Affairs in 1961. In 1961 he represented Guinea at the 1st Summit of the Non-Aligned Movement in Belgrade, FPR Yugoslavia. After the Guinean government allowed Kwame Nkrumah, the ousted President of Ghana, to live in exile in Guinea, the authorities in Ghana detained Beavogui at the airport in Accra while he was on his way to Ethiopia for a conference of the Organization of African Unity in October 1966. He remained Foreign Minister until May 1969, when he was moved back to his position as Minister of Economic Affairs.

At the end of the Ninth Congress of the ruling Democratic Party of Guinea (PDG) on 25 April 1972, President Touré said that Beavogui would become Prime Minister; that position had not previously existed. Beavogui served as Prime Minister from 26 April 1972 to 3 April 1984.

== Interim presidency and military coup ==
Touré died on 26 March 1984. Per the Constitution, Beavogui by virtue of being prime minister became interim president. A week later, on 3 April, the PDG's Politburo was due to select a new leader. Beavogui, a close friend of Touré, was widely expected to succeed him. Under the Constitution, since the PDG was the sole legally permitted party, the newly elected leader would have been automatically elected to a seven-year term as president, and would have been confirmed in office via a referendum the following spring. Thus, had Beavogui been elected as the PDG's leader, he would have been all but assured of becoming president in his own right.

During his brief presidency, he said goodbye to his predecessor at his funeral. Lansana Beavogui spoke at a mourning rally at the Palais du Peuple on March 28, met with many delegations who arrived for the funeral at the airport, read a farewell speech at Sékou Touré's funeral on March 30. However, hours before the meeting was to begin, Colonel Lansana Conté and Lieutenant Colonel Diarra Traoré led a military coup which toppled the government. The PDG was dissolved, and the Constitution was suspended.

Following the coup, Beavogui was imprisoned in Kindia prison until being taken to Conakry for medical treatment. He died of diabetes while hospitalized in Conakry in August 1984.

== See also ==
- Politics of Guinea

Political offices
Preceded by Ahmed Sékou Touré	Foreign Minister of Guinea; 1961–1969	Succeeded by Saifoulaye Diallo
Preceded by Post Abolished	Prime Minister of Guinea; 1972–1984	Succeeded by Diarra Traoré
Preceded by Ahmed Sékou Touré	President of Guinea (interim); 1984	Succeeded by Lansana Conté
