= 1982 Guinean presidential election =

- 9 May 1982
- Turnout: 98.83%
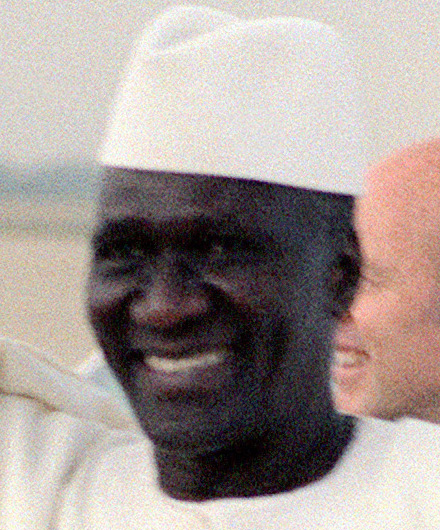
Nominee	Ahmed Sékou Touré
Party	PDG-RDA
Popular vote	3,063,692
Percentage	100%
President before election
Ahmed Sékou Touré
PDG-RDA
Elected President
Ahmed Sékou Touré
PDG-RDA

Presidential elections were held in Guinea on 9 May 1982. Incumbent Ahmed Sékou Touré was the only candidate (as the country as a one-party state with his Democratic Party of Guinea as the sole legal party at the time), and was re-elected unopposed. Voter turnout was reported to be 99%.

== Results ==
Candidate	Party	Votes	%
Ahmed Sékou Touré	Democratic Party of Guinea	3,063,692	100.00
Total		3,063,692	100.00
Valid votes		3,063,692	100.00
Invalid/blank votes		8	0.00
Total votes		3,063,700	100.00
Registered voters/turnout		3,100,110	98.83
Source: Nohlen et al.
