= 1951 French legislative election in Senegal =

Elections to the French National Assembly were held in Senegal on 17 June 1951 as part of the wider French elections. Two members were elected from the territory, both of which were won by the Senegalese Democratic Bloc. Abbas Gueye and Léopold Sédar Senghor were the two elected members.

== Results ==
Party	Votes	%	Seats	+/–
Senegalese Democratic Bloc	212,317	67.77	2	New
French Section of the Workers' International	95,947	30.63	0	−2
Rally of the French People	5,012	1.60	0	New
Total	313,276	100.00	2	0
Valid votes	313,276	98.76		
Invalid/blank votes	3,924	1.24		
Total votes	317,200	100.00		
Registered voters/turnout	665,280	47.68		
Source: Sternberger et al.De Benoist
