= African Democratic Party of Guinea =

Political party in Guinea

The African Democratic Party of Guinea (French: Parti démocratique africain de Guinée), initially called Democratic Party of Guinea-Ahmed Sékou Touré (Parti démocratique de Guinée-Ahmed Sékou Touré) is a political party in Guinea. PDG-AST was founded in January 1994, following a split in the Democratic Party of Guinea-African Democratic Rally (PDG-RDA). The party was led by Marcel Cross, father-in-law of Toure's son Mohammed.

In the lead-up to the split in PDG-RDA, the PDG-AST founders largely centered their criticism against the party leader Ismael Gushein, whom they accused of 'political scheming'. In the bitterness around the party split, PDG-RDA branded PDG-AST as 'traitors'. PDG-AST upheld the legacy of the 12th PDG party congress, which had opened up for political and economic reforms. Whilst PDG-RDA became supportive of the government of Lansana Conte, PDG-AST joined the opposition camp. PDG-AST had a following among Malinke officers purged after the end of Sekou Toure's rule.

In May 1994, PDG-AST formed a pact with the National Democratic Union of Guinea. In the 1995 Guinean legislative election, the party obtained 1.15% of the proportional representation vote and won one seat.

PDG-AST in the 1995 legislative election
Region	Constituency	Votes	%
Boké	Boké	829	1.44
Boké	Boffa	60	0.10
Boké	Fria	255	1.21
Boké	Gaoual	413	1.38
Boké	Koundara	451	2.00
Kindia	Kindia	742	0.87
Kindia	Télimélé	691	0.98
Kindia	Coyah	204	1.01
Kindia	Forécariah	235	0.41
Kindia	Dubréka	3	0.01
Mamou	Mamou	919	1.49
Mamou	Dalaba	839	2.20
Mamou	Pita	1,219	1.84
Labé	Labé	1,655	2.35
Labé	Mali	829	1.28
Labé	Tougué	515	1.62
Labé	Koubia	637	2.49
Labé	Lélouma	935	2.44
Faranah	Faranah	896	1.69
Faranah	Kissidougou	572	0.95
Faranah	Dabola	651	2.48
Faranah	Dingulraye	530	1.58
Kankan	Kankan	469	0.64
Kankan	Koumussa	461	1.02
Kankan	Siguiri	811	1.15
Kankan	Kerouane	417	1.14
Kankan	Mandiana	1,107	2.23
Nzérékoré	N'Zerekore	533	0.70
Nzérékoré	Macenta	353	0.65
Nzérékoré	Gueckedou	480	0.70
Nzérékoré	Beyla	532	1.07
Nzérékoré	Lola	270	0.81
Nzérékoré	Yomou	176	0.63
Conakry	Kaloum	211	0.80
Conakry	Dixinn	194	0.53
Conakry	Ratoma	198	0.38
Conakry	Matam	263	0.67
Conakry	Matoto	678	1.02
Total		21,233	1.15

Following the election, PDG-AST joined the Democratic Opposition Coordination (CODEM), a movement of 12 opposition parties protesting against the legitimacy of the official election result. Subsequently, the Supreme Court, based on a request from PDG-RDA, withdrew the registration of PDG-AST as a political party. The party subsequently took the name PDAG.

Ahead of the 1998 Guinean presidential election, PDAG had entered a pact to support the candidature of RPG leader Alpha Condé. The day before the election, security forces raided Cross' residence, arrested him and claimed that he was amassing arms for a coup d'état. He was released two months later.
