= List of presidents of Guinea =

President of the Republic of Guinea
- Président de la République de Guinée (French) ߖߌ߬ߣߍ߬ ߞߊ߲ߕߌ߮ ߟߎ߬ ߛߙߍߘߍ (N'Ko)
- Coat of arms of Guinea

- Presidential Standard

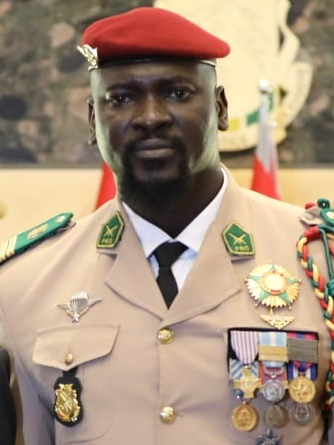
- Incumbent; Mamady Doumbouya since 5 September 2021 (Note: Styled as Chairman of the National Committee of Reconciliation and Development until 1 October 2021, when he was additionally sworn in as Interim President. He was inaugurated as a civilian president on 17 January 2026.)
- Style: His Excellency
- Type: President
- Status: Head of state; Commander-in-chief
- Residence: Presidential Palace, Conakry
- Term length: Seven years, renewable once
- Constituting instrument: Constitution of Guinea
- Inaugural holder: Ahmed Sékou Touré
- Formation: 2 October 1958; 67 years ago
- Salary: US$22,390 annually
- Website: presidence.gov.gn

This article lists the presidents of Guinea, since the country gained independence from France in 1958 (after rejecting to join the French Community in a constitutional referendum).

== Term limits ==
As of 2021, there is a two-term limit for the president in the Constitution of Guinea. This limit has been lifted for Conté in 2001 and for Condé in 2020.

== List of officeholders ==
Political parties

Democratic Party of Guinea – African Democratic Rally (PDG–RDA)
Unity and Progress Party (PUP)
Rally of the Guinean People (RPG)

Other factions

Military

Status

Denotes acting President

Symbols

^{§} Elected unopposed

^{†} Died in office

No.	Portrait	Name (Birth–Death)	Elected	Term of office			Political party
No.	Portrait	Name (Birth–Death)	Elected	Took office	Left office	Time in office	Political party
1		Ahmed Sékou Touré (1922–1984)	1961^{[§]} 1968^{[§]} 1974^{[§]} 1982^{[§]}	2 October 1958	26 March 1984^{[†]}	25 years, 176 days	PDG–RDA
—		Louis Lansana Beavogui (1923–1984)	—	26 March 1984	3 April 1984 (Deposed in a coup)	8 days	PDG–RDA
—		Lansana Conté (1934–2008) (Note: Styled as Chairman of the Military Committee of National Restoration until 5 April 1984.)	—	3 April 1984	22 December 2008^{[†]}	24 years, 263 days	Military / PUP
2		Lansana Conté (1934–2008)	1993; 1998; 2003	3 April 1984	22 December 2008^{[†]}	24 years, 263 days	Military / PUP
3		Moussa Dadis Camara (born 1964) (Note: Styled as Chairman of the National Council for Democracy and Development.)	—	23 December 2008 (Took power in a coup)	3 December 2009 (Note: Incapacitated after an assassination attempt.)	345 days	Military
—		Sékouba Konaté (born 1966)	—	3 December 2009	21 December 2010	1 year, 18 days	Military
4		Alpha Condé (born 1938)	2010; 2015; 2020	21 December 2010	5 September 2021 (Deposed in a coup)	10 years, 258 days	RPG
—		Mamady Doumbouya (born 1984)	—	5 September 2021	17 January 2026	5 years, 2 days	Military / GMD
5		Mamady Doumbouya (born 1984)	2025	17 January 2026	Incumbent	5 years, 2 days	Military / GMD

== See also ==
- Politics of Guinea
- List of prime ministers of Guinea
- List of colonial governors of French Guinea
