= Military Committee of National Restoration =

The Military Committee of National Restoration (French: Comité militaire de redressement national, CMRN) was the ruling junta of Guinea which, led by Colonel Lansana Conté, seized power in a coup d'état on 3 April 1984, following the death of President Ahmed Sékou Touré on 26 March. It was composed of 18 members who represented the three tribes of the country, including Col. Lansana Conté, President from 1984 to 2008, Kerfalla Camara, Facinet Touré and Diarra Traoré, Prime Minister in 1984, who was executed following a failed coup attempt in 1985. It was dissolved on 16 January 1991 and replaced by the Transitional National Recovery Committee (CTRN), which was chaired and composed on equal basis by civilians and military. The CMRN proclaimed economic reforms which include economic liberalization.

== See also ==
- Politics of Guinea
