= 1980 Guinean parliamentary election =

Parliamentary elections were held in Guinea on 27 January 1980. The country was a one-party state at the time, with the Democratic Party of Guinea – African Democratic Rally as the sole legal party. The party produced a list of 210 candidates for the 210 seats (increased from 150), which voters were asked to approve. Voter turnout was reported to be 95.69%.

== Results ==
Party	Votes	%	Seats	+/–
Democratic Party of Guinea	2,393,600	100.00	210	+60
Total	2,393,600	100.00	210	+60
Valid votes	2,393,600	99.80		
Invalid/blank votes	4,756	0.20		
Total votes	2,398,356	100.00		
Registered voters/turnout	2,506,298	95.69		
Source: African Elections Database
