= Albert Liurette =

Guinean politician (1904–?)

Albert Liurette (born July 3, 1904; date of death unknown) was a Guinean physician and politician. He was born in Kouta. Liurette studied at the Ecole de medicine in Dakar, obtaining a diploma in African medicine. Sergeant at 2e R.I.C.(French Army, Deuxième Régiment d'Infanterie Coloniale), he was arrested by the Wehrmacht and prisoner at Frontstalag 180 (Amboise, Indre & Loire, France) until 1941. Ahead of the June 17, 1951, election to the French National Assembly, Liurette was placed on the second place on the list of the French Section of the Workers' International (SFIO). Obtaining 67,480 votes (30.5%), the SFIO won two of the three seats allocated to Guinea. Yaciné Diallo and Liurette were elected to the National Assembly.

Liurette became a secretary of the National Assembly in January 1955.
