= 1963 Guinean parliamentary election =

Parliamentary elections were held in Guinea on 28 September 1963. At the time the country was a one-party state with the Democratic Party of Guinea – African Democratic Rally as the sole legal party. It therefore won all of the 75 seats in the National Assembly.
