= Socialist Party of Guinea =

Political party in Guinea

The Socialist Party of Guinea was a political party in Guinea, founded ahead of the November 1946 National Assembly election. The party grew out of the Fulani Club at the École William Ponty. The list of the Socialist Party for the election consisted of Mamba Sano (a Forestier leader) and Barry Diawadou (president of AGV). The list won one of the two seats accorded to Guinea, and Sano was elected. All in all, the list of the party had obtained 30,982 votes.
