= Sékou Sanogo =

Ivorian politician

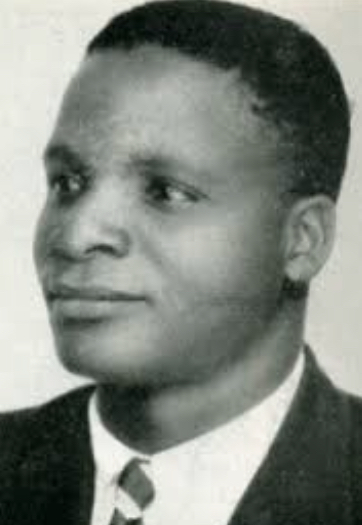
SEKOU SANOGO (Député)

Sékou Sanogo (January 1, 1921 in Dioulassoba, Bobo-Dioulasso – 1962) was an Ivorian politician, leader of the Parti Progressiste, who served in the French National Assembly from 1951 to 1955.
