= Diawadou Barry =

Guinean politician

Diawadou Barry (born 10 May 1916 in Dabola, French Guinea; died c. 1969 in Conakry, Guinea), sometimes referred to as Barry Diawadou, was a Guinean politician who served in the French National Assembly from 1954 to 1958. After Guinean independence, he served as Minister of Economy and Finance and Minister of Education. The eldest son of Barry Aguibou, the Almami of Dabola, he was a descendant of the Soriya branch of the former ruling dynasty in the Islamic confederacy of the Futa Jalon.

He stood as an independent politician in the 1954 by-election and won from Ahmed Sékou Touré's PDG-RDA. However, the election was marred with irregularities. The French minister Robert Buron admitted in 1968 that the election had been rigged by France to prevent Sékou Touré from winning and prop up the more loyal Barry, who was seen as the representative of the "traditional chiefs and white residents of the Futa Jalon".

Barry served as Minister of Economy and Finance and Minister of Education in the early 1960s, after Sékou Touré had become the first president of Guinea. In January 1961, he was replaced as Minister of Education by the more radical Damantang Camara. He went on to serve as ambassador to Egypt in subsequent years.

The French investigative journalists Roger Faligot and Pascal Krop have claimed that Barry, a devout Muslim who repeatedly completed the hajj, "dreamed of establishing an Islamic republic in Guinea" and that he was actively supported by the French intelligence agency SDECE to foment anti-government sentiment among the Fula.

In February 1969, Barry was swept up in the events surrounding the so-called Labé plot (sometimes Kaman-Fodeba plot) against Sékou Touré's regime. His arrest and imprisonment were part of a complex strategy that enabled the government to rid itself of politically troublesome individuals at the time. Barry was just one of dozens of the accused, who included other ministers and cabinet members, senior civil servants, and military officers — all allegedly participants in the plot. He was executed by firing squad in Camp Boiro, either shortly after being condemned to death in 1969 or sometime in the following years.
