= Ismael Gushein =

Guinean politician (died 2016)

El Hadj Ismael Mohamed Gassim Gushein (died 11 January 2016) was a Guinean politician who served as Secretary-General of the Democratic Party of Guinea-African Democratic Rally (PDG-RDA).

Gushein was elected to the National Assembly in the 1995 legislative election and sat on the National Assembly's Foreign Affairs Commission during the 1995–2002 parliamentary term. In the 30 June 2002 legislative election, Gushein was re-elected to the National Assembly as a PDG-RDA candidate. The party won 3.4% of the popular vote and three out of 114 seats in that election.
