= Pierre Fayet =

French theoretical physicist

- Born: 4 December 1949 (age 76)
- Scientific career
- Fields: theoretical physics
- Institutions: Caltech; CERN; CNRS; Laboratoire de Physique Théorique de l'ENS

Pierre Fayet (born 4 December 1949) is a French theoretical physicist.

== Biography ==
Pierre Fayet studied at the École normale supérieure, worked from 1977 to 1979 at Caltech, then at CERN. Currently research director at the CNRS, he works at the Laboratoire de Physique Théorique de l'ENS (LPTENS). He has been a corresponding member of the Academy of Sciences since 1997.

Mainly known for his work in supersymmetry, he introduced the idea of supersymmetric partners (photino for photon, gluino for gluon, etc.).

He also introduced with Jean Iliopoulos a mechanism for spontaneous breakage of supersymmetry called the Fayet-Iliopoulos mechanism.

== Main publications ==
- (in English) P. Fayet, J. Iliopoulos,, Phys.Lett.B51:461-464,1974. (Entrée sur SPIRES)
- (in English) P. Fayet, Supergauge Invariant Extension Of The Higgs Mechanism And A Model For The Electron And Its Neutrino., Nucl.Phys.B90:104-124,1975. (Entrée sur SPIRES)
- (in English) P. Fayet, S. Ferrara, Supersymmetry, Phys.Rept.32:249-334,1977. (Entrée sur SPIRES)
- (in English) P. Fayet, Spontaneously Broken Supersymmetric Theories Of Weak, Electromagnetic And Strong Interactions., Phys.Lett.B69:489,1977. (Entrée sur SPIRES)
- (in English) G.R. Farrar, Pierre Fayet, Phenomenology Of The Production, Decay, And Detection Of New Hadronic States Associated With Supersymmetry., Phys.Lett.B76:575-579,1978. (Entrée sur SPIRES)
