= Maurice Rabier =

French politician

Maurice Rabier (12 November 1907 – 28 July 1999) was a French politician.

Rabier was born in Oran, French Algeria. He represented the French Section of the Workers' International (SFIO) in the Constituent Assembly elected in 1945, in the Constituent Assembly elected in 1946 and in the National Assembly from 1946 to 1955.
