= Socialist Democracy of Guinea =

Political party in Guinea

Socialist Democracy of Guinea Démocratie Socialiste de Guinée
- Leader: Barry III
- Founder: Abdoulaye Diallo; Chaikou Baldé; Barry III
- Founded: 1954
- Dissolved: April 1958
- Merged into: Guinean People's Union
- Ideology: Socialism; Democratic socialism Social democracy
- Political position: Left-wing
- National affiliation: SFIO

The Socialist Democracy of Guinea (French: Démocratie Socialiste de Guinée, DSG) was a political party in Guinea. DSG was founded in the run-up to the 1954 legislative election by Abdoulaye Diallo, Chaikou Baldé and Ibrahima Barry (a.k.a. 'Barry III'). DSG was a continuation of the party led by Yaciné Diallo. DSG was the Guinean affiliate of the French Section of the Workers' International (SFIO).

Barry III was the candidate of the party in the election. Barry III came third in the 1954 election with 16,098 votes (6.3%).

The French colonial administration was opposed to DSG. The French administration hoped to thwart the radical African Democratic Rally (RDA) of Sékou Touré, and with this purpose they propped up the conservative African Bloc of Guinea (BAG, a party tied to Fula chiefs). The administration did not wish that any other party that would rival BAG as the anti-RDA force in Guinea, thus disapproving of the emergence of DSG. At its July 1954 congress SFIO charged that the French governor in Guinea had openly supported the BAG candidate, in contradiction to the neutrality that an administrative official should have adhered to. However, when there was a vote in the French National Assembly on validating the Guinean election result, SFIO voted in favour validation.

DSG mobilized educated, modernist Fulas. It was never able to become a mass party, and its influence was largely limited to the Futa Jalon. Barry III's attacks on traditional chiefs alienated large parts of the Fula population away from the party. DSG published the bimonthly Le Populaire de Guinée.

DSG held its first congress in Dixinn November 20–22, 1955.

In the 1956 legislative election, DSG obtained 9.8% of the vote in Guinea. In the municipal elections held the same year, DSG won in Dalaba and Labé.

In January 1957, DSG became an affiliate of the African Socialist Movement (MSA). In the March 1957 Territorial Assembly election DSG won all three assembly seats from Pita.

In April 1958, DSG merged with BAG, forming the Guinean branch of the African Regroupment Party (PRA).
