= African Socialist Movement =

Political party in French West Africa (1957–58)

African Socialist Movement Mouvement Socialiste Africain
- President: Lamine Guèye
- General Secretary: Barry III
- Founder: Lamine Guèye; Djibo Bakary; Barry III
- Founded: 13 January 1957
- Merged into: PRA
- Ideology: Socialism

African Socialist Movement (French: Mouvement Socialiste Africain, MSA) was a political party in French West Africa. The MSA was formed following a meeting of the Section française de l'Internationale ouvrière (SFIO) federations of Cameroon, Chad, the French Congo (now the Republic of the Congo and Gabon), French Sudan (now Mali), Guinea, Niger, Oubangui-Chari (now the Central African Republic), and Senegal; the meeting was held in Conakry from 11 to 13 January 1957. At that meeting it was decided that the African federations would break with its French parent organisation and form the MSA.

The first meeting of the leading committee of MSA met from 9 to 10 February in Dakar the same year. Two SFIO delegates attended the session. MSA opted for a federalist solution for French West Africa. On 26 March 1958, the MSA signed a declaration in Paris merging itself into the African Regroupment Party (PRA).

== Leadership ==
At its founding, Lamine Guèye became the president of MSA, Barry III the general secretary and Djibo Bakary the deputy general secretary.

== Sections ==
The Senegalese section of MSA was the Senegalese Party of Socialist Action (PSAS), and it was led by Lamine Guèye. In Guinea, the Socialist Democracy of Guinea was the section of MSA. The Sudanese section of MSA was the Progressive Sudanese Party, while what became the Niger section retained the MSA name as the Mouvement Socialiste Africain-Sawaba.
