= Marcel Ribère =

French politician

Marcel Ribère (16 March 1900 - 12 February 1966) was a French politician.

Ribère was born in Souk Ahras, Algeria. He represented the Popular Republican Movement (MRP) in the Constituent Assembly elected in 1945 and the Rally of the French People (RPF) in the National Assembly from 1951 to 1955.
