= 1984 Guinean coup d'état =

Coup that brought Lansana Conté to power

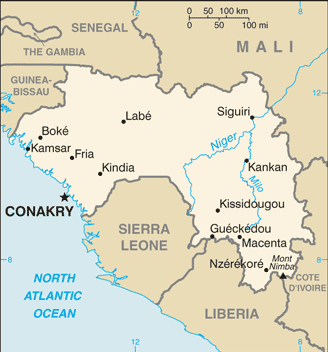
- Map of Guinea.
Date	3 April 1984
Location	Conakry, Guinea 9°31′N 13°42′W
Result	Coup attempt succeeds with minimum disruption.: Prime Minister and Interim President Louis Lansana Beavogui removed from offices and incarcerated.; Colonel Lansana Conté installed as new President.

Belligerents
(Guinea) Government: Democratic Party of Guinea (PDG)	(Guinea) Military Committee of National Restoration (CMNR): Military

Commanders and leaders
Louis Lansana Beavogui	Lansana Conté

Casualties and losses
- No casualties reported.
- Nexus of coup in Conakry (marked green), Guinea

The 1984 Guinean coup d'état was the bloodless military coup that took place in Guinea on 3 April 1984, led by Colonel Lansana Conté. It led to the deposition of Prime Minister Louis Lansana Beavogui, who had held the office since 1972, and had been serving as interim president since 26 March, when longtime President Ahmed Sékou Touré died during an emergency heart operation at the Cleveland Clinic in the United States.

== The coup ==
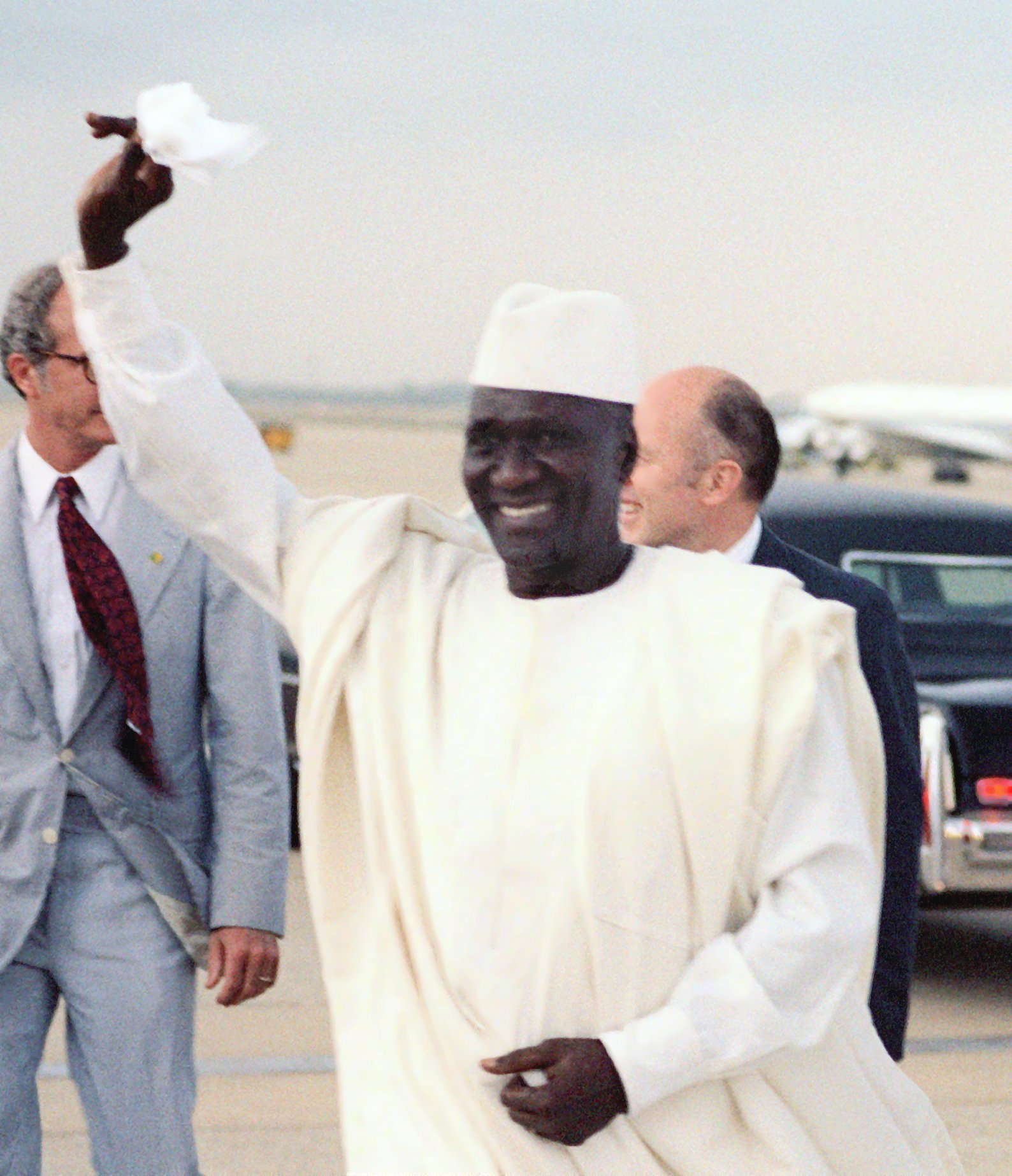
President Ahmed Sékou Touré at the Andrews AFB in Maryland, arriving for a state visit to the United States on 29 June 1982, twenty-three months before his death and the 1984 coup.

The military struck just hours before the Politburo of the Democratic Party of Guinea (PDG), the only legally permitted party in the country, was to select a new leader. Interim president Beavogui was expected to win. Under the Constitution, the PDG's leader would have been automatically elected to a seven-year term as president, and would have been confirmed in office via a referendum the following spring.

Colonel Conté suspended the constitution and dissolved the PDG, the National Assembly and all mass organizations. The Military Committee of National Restoration (CMNR) was created as the ruling junta. He ordered the release of political prisoners held at Camp Boiro, a concentration camp within the capital Conakry. Conté was named new President on 5 April.

== Aftermath ==
Eventually, a power struggle developed between Conté and a fellow member of the CMNR, Lieutenant Colonel Diarra Traoré (who briefly served as Prime Minister in April–December 1984), with the latter being executed in the aftermath of a failed coup attempt in July 1985. Conté took advantage of the coup attempt to execute several of Ahmed Sekou Touré's close associates, including his half-brother Ismaël Touré (former chief prosecutor at Camp Boiro), Mamadi Keïta, Siaka Touré (former commander of Camp Boiro), Moussa Diakité, and Abdoulaye Touré (former Minister of Foreign Affairs).

Conté remained in power until his death on 22 December 2008, which was almost immediately followed by another coup d'état, led by Captain Moussa Dadis Camara.

== See also ==
- History of Guinea
