= 1951 French legislative election =

- 17 June 1951

All 625 seats in the French National Assembly 313 seats needed for a majority
- Turnout: 80.19% (▲2.09pp)
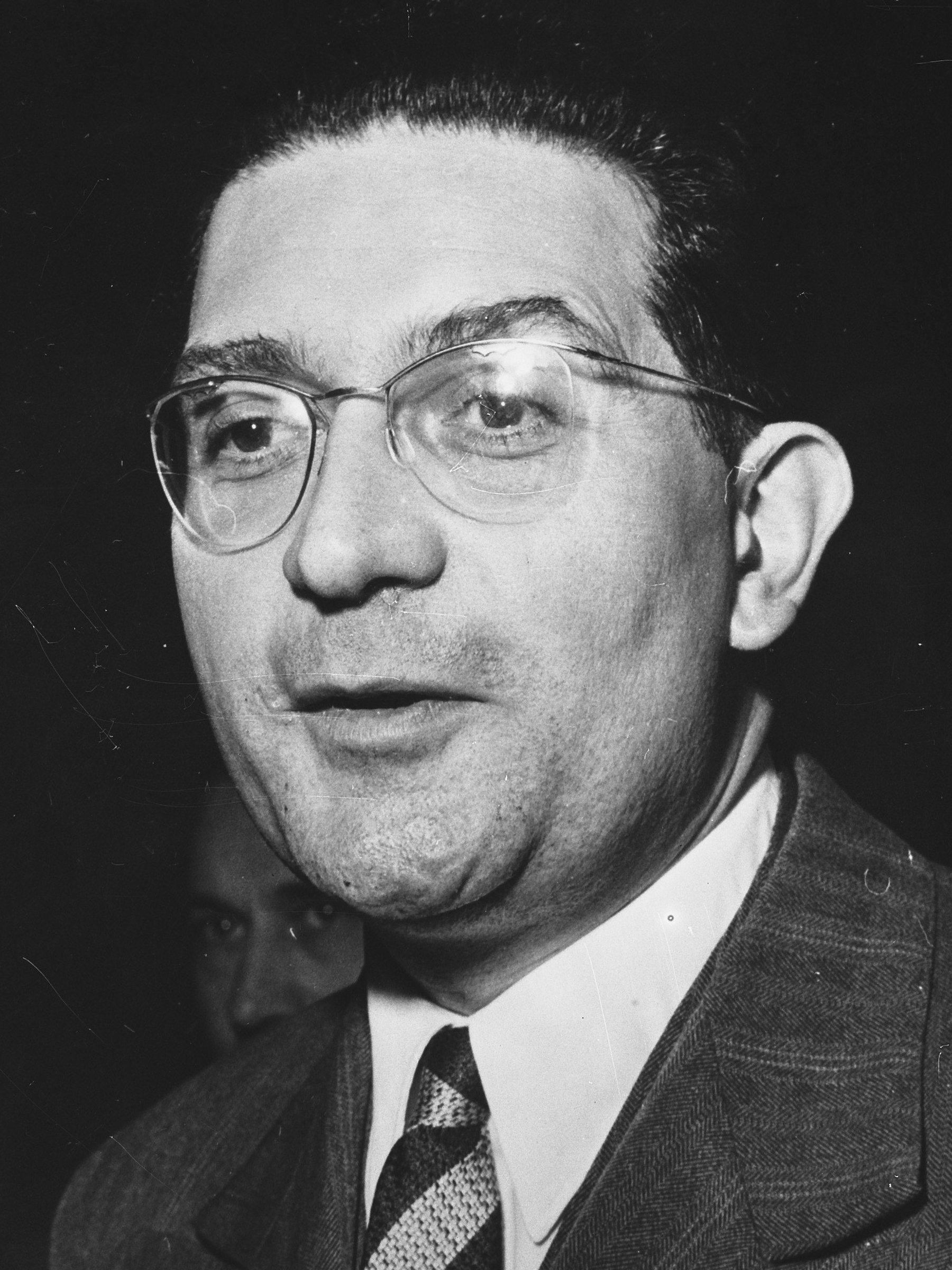

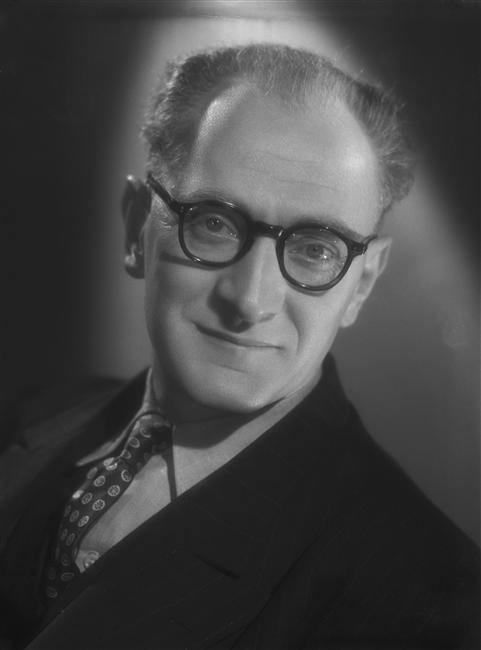

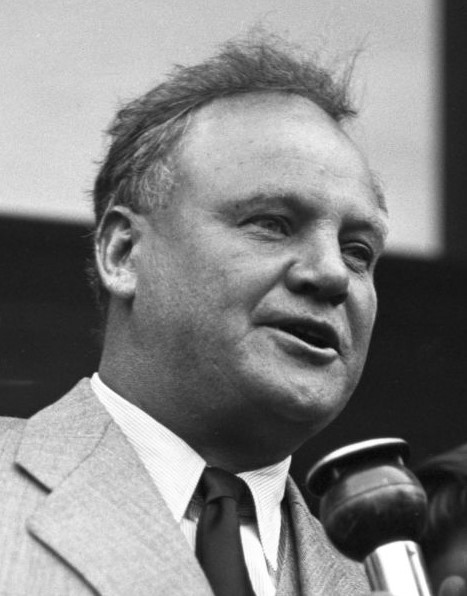

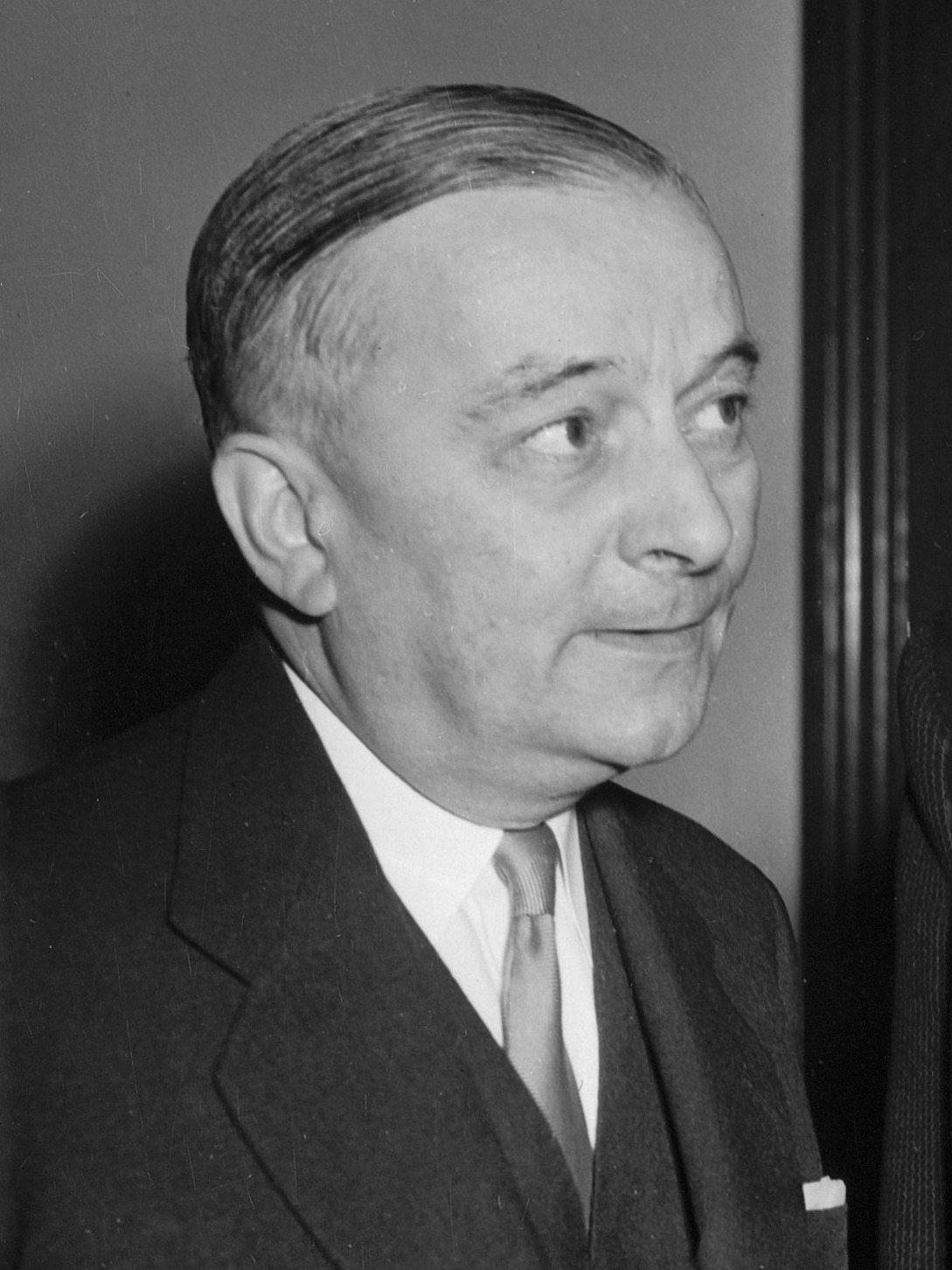
	First party	Second party	Third party
Leader	Jacques Soustelle	Guy Mollet	Maurice Thorez
Party	RPF	SFIO	PCF
Last election	–	90 seats	166 seats
Seats won	107	94	97
Seat change	▲107	▲4	▼69
Popular vote	4,125,492	2,744,842	5,056,605
Percentage	21.57%	14.35%	26.43%
	Fourth party	Fifth party	Sixth party
	CNI		RGR
Leader	none	Georges Bidault	Jean-Paul David
Party	CNIP	MRP	RGR
Last election	70 seats	158 seats	55 seats
Seats won	87	82	77
Seat change	▲17	▼76	▲22
Popular vote	2,656,995	2,369,788	1,887,583
Percentage	13.89%	12.39%	9.87%
- Results by department
Prime Minister before election
Henri Queuille
PRV
Elected Prime Minister
René Pleven
UDSR

Legislative elections were held in France on 17 June 1951 to elect the second National Assembly of the Fourth Republic.

After the Second World War, the three parties which took a major part in the French Resistance to the German occupation dominated the political scene and government: the French Communist Party (PCF), the French Section of the Workers' International (SFIO, socialist party) and the Christian democratic Popular Republican Movement (MRP). The forces associated with the Third Republic and the 1940 disaster (the Radical Party and the classical Right) were considered as archaic and were the losers of the post-war elections.

Nevertheless, after the proclamation of the Fourth Republic, the 1947 strikes and the beginning of the Cold War, the Three-parties alliance split. In spring 1947, the Communist ministers were dismissed. At the same time, Charles de Gaulle, symbol of the Resistance, founded his Rally of the French People (RPF) which campaigned for constitutional reform and criticized the "parties' regime" as a rebirth of the defunct Third Republic.

The Socialists and the Christian-Democrats allied with the Rally of the Republican Lefts (composed of the Radicals and the Democratic and Socialist Union of the Resistance, UDSR) and right-wing groupings to form the Third Force. This coalition defended the regime against the opposition of the Communists on the one hand, and the Gaullists on the other. But this diverse alliance did not lead to a stable executive power. Indeed, its components advocated opposing policies on the economy, the finances of the state, secularism (laïcité) and denominational schools. This discontent was beneficial to the Communists and the Gaullists.

In March 1951 Henri Queuille (Radical Party) became head of the cabinet. His Vice-Prime Ministers were Georges Bidault (MRP), Guy Mollet (SFIO) and René Pleven (UDSR). In order to limit the number of seats won by the Communists and the Gaullists, an electoral reform was passed. The proportional representation system was conserved but if an alliance of parties obtained more than 50% of votes in a given constituency, it would win all the seats by joining their votes together (apparentment). The promoters of the electoral reform knew the Communists and the Gaullists were so different from allies contrary to the parties of the Third Force. They hoped the alliance of the pro-government parties would reach the 50% threshold in a maximum of constituencies, whereas the PCF and the RPF would be eliminated of representation.

Whilst the PCF and the RPF were the two largest parties in terms of the popular vote, the Third Force remained the parliamentary majority. Due to the electoral system, the Communist Party, which won more votes than any other party, was only third in terms of the number of seats won. In the winning coalition, the SFIO and the MRP lost support whereas the Radicals and the classical Right made gains. However, due to continuing internal divisions (about the denominational schools, the budget and the colonial question) the problem of the stability of the executive was not resolved. In August 1951, René Pleven replaced Henri Queuille as Prime Minister and the Socialists left the cabinet.

== Results ==
Party	Votes	%	Seats	+/–
French Communist Party	5,056,605	26.43	97	–69
Rally of the French People	4,125,492	21.57	107	+102
French Section of the Workers' International	2,744,842	14.35	94	–40
Conservatives (CNIP–UNIR–RGRIF)	2,656,995	13.89	87	+14
Popular Republican Movement	2,369,788	12.39	82	–57
Rally of Republican Lefts	1,887,583	9.87	77	New
Others	125,739	0.66	0	–
Incomplete ballots	161,960	0.85	–	–
Total	19,129,004	100.00	544	0
Valid votes	19,129,004	97.25		
Invalid/blank votes	541,591	2.75		
Total votes	19,670,595	100.00		
Registered voters/turnout	24,530,523	80.19		
Source: Nohlen & Stöver

== See also ==
- 1951 French legislative election in Algeria
- 1951 French legislative election in Cameroon
- 1951 French legislative election in Chad–Ubangi-Shari
- 1951 French legislative election in French Sudan
- 1951 French legislative election in Guinea
- 1951 French legislative election in Ivory Coast
- 1951 French legislative election in Senegal
