= Mamba Sano =

Guinean politician (1903–1985)

Mamba Sano (1903 in Kissidougou, Guinea – 4 July 1985) was a Guinean politician who served in the French National Assembly from 1946-1958.
