= Yacine Diallo =

Guinean politician

General Secretary of the SFIO Guinean Branch
- Succeeded by: Barry III (Socialist Democracy of Guinea)

Personal details
- Born: 18 October 1897 Labé, French West Africa
- Died: 14 April 1954 (aged 56) Conakry, French West Africa
- Party: SFIO

Yacine Diallo (October 18, 1897, in Labé, Guinea – April 14, 1954, in Conakry) was a politician from Guinea who served in the French National Assembly from 1946 to 1954. His death led to the 1954 by-election.
