= Ahmed Sékou Touré =

President of Guinea from 1958 to 1984

- ߛߋߞߎ߬ ߕߎ߬ߙߋ
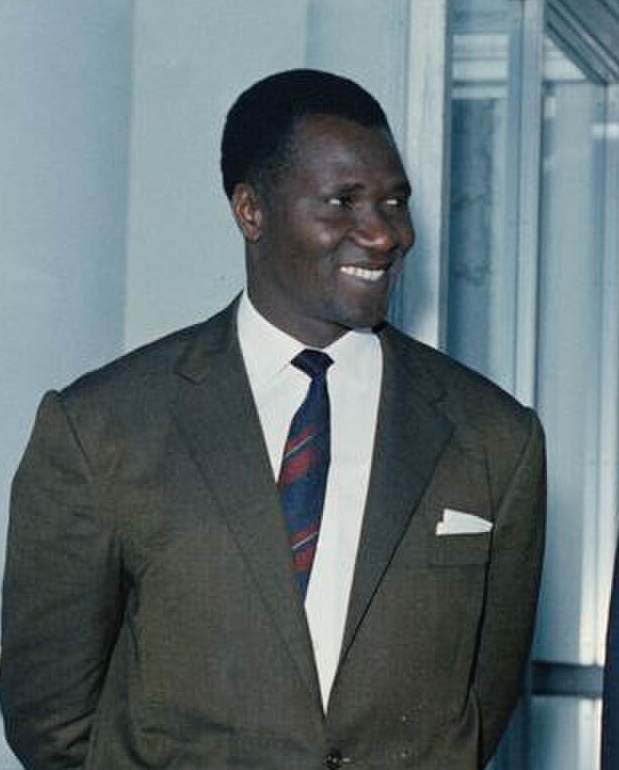
- Touré in 1962

1st President of Guinea
- In office 2 October 1958 – 26 March 1984
- Prime Minister: Louis Lansana Beavogui
- Preceded by: Office established
- Succeeded by: Louis Lansana Beavogui (acting); Lansana Conté

Personal details
- Born: 9 January 1922 Faranah, French Guinea
- Died: 26 March 1984 (aged 62) Cleveland, Ohio, U.S.
- Party: Democratic Party
- Spouses: Marie N'Daw (m. 1947; died 1952); Andrée Touré (m. 1953)
- Children: Aminata Touré, Mohamed Touré

Ahmed Sékou Touré (var. Sheku Turay or Ture; N'Ko: ߛߋߞߎ߬ ߕߎ߬ߙߋ; 9 January 1922 – 26 March 1984) was a Guinean political leader and African statesman who was the first president of Guinea from 1958 until his death in 1984. Touré was among the primary Guinean nationalists involved in gaining independence of the country from France. He died in the United States in 1984.

A devout Muslim from the Mandinka ethnic group, Sékou Touré was the great-grandson of the powerful Mandinka Muslim cleric Samori Ture who established an independent Islamic polity in part of West Africa. In 1960, he declared his Democratic Party of Guinea (Parti démocratique de Guinée, PDG) the only legal party in the state, and ruled from then on as a virtual dictator. He was re-elected unopposed to four seven-year terms in the absence of any legal opposition. Under his rule many people were killed, most notably at Camp Boiro.

== Childhood and family background ==
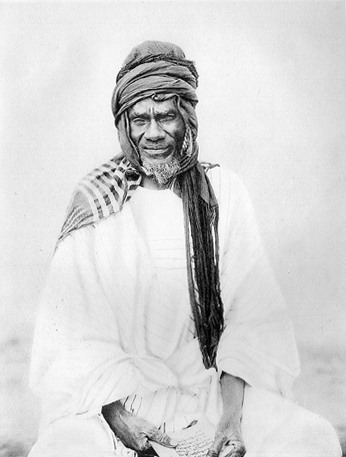
Samori Ture, Touré's great-grandfather was the founder of the Wassoulou Empire, an Islamic state in present-day Guinea that resisted French colonial rule in West Africa from 1882 until his capture in 1898.

Sékou Touré was born on 9 January 1922, into a Muslim family in Faranah, French Guinea, part of French West Africa. Faranah is a town deep inside Guinea situated on the banks of the Niger River. He was one of seven children born to Alpha Touré and Aminata Fadiga, who were subsistence farmers. He was an aristocratic member of the Mandinka ethnic group. His great-grandfather was Samori Ture (Samory Touré), a noted Muslim Mandinka king who founded the Wassoulou Empire (1861–1890) in the territory of Guinea and Mali, defeating numerous small African states with his large, professionally organized and equipped army. He resisted French colonial rule until his capture in 1898, and died while held in exile in Gabon.

His father Alpha Touré was originally from the French Sudan (now Mali), and had migrated to the traditional gold mining town of Siguiri with his brothers. He eventually continued to Kankan, Kouroussa, Kissidougou, and then settled in Faranah. Aminata was not his first wife. She bore three babies, including Sékou and a brother who died in childhood, then she died giving birth to a third child, a girl named Nounkoumba. Sékou's birth supposedly coincided with an omen - a baby elephant was brought to Faranah and presented to the French colonial authorities.

Sékou Touré attended the École Coranique (Qur'anic school) in his hometown and later a French lower-primary school in Kankan. He allegedly failed the exams to enter the École normale supérieure William Ponty for refusing to write an essay critical of his ancestor Samori Toure. He was enrolled in the Georges Poiret Technical College in Conakry in 1936 but was expelled less than a year later at the age of 15 for leading a student protest against the quality of food and quickly became involved in labor union activity. During his youth, Touré studied the works of Karl Marx and Vladimir Lenin, among others.

== Politics and trade unions ==
In 1940, Touré obtained a clerk's position with the Compagnie du Niger Français while also working to complete an examination course, which would allow him to join the Post, Telegraph and Telecommunications services (French: Postes, télégraphes et téléphones (PTT)). After completing the examination course, he went on to work for the PTT as a postal clerk in Conakry in 1941. During this time, he formed connections with the French General Confederation of Labour, a communist-dominated French labor organization.

Touré first became politically active while working for the PTT. In 1945, he founded the Post and Telecommunications Workers' Union (SPTT; the first trade union in French Guinea), and he became the general secretary of the union in 1946. Also the same year, he was a founding member of the African Democratic Rally (French: Rassemblement Démocratique Africain, RDA), an alliance of political parties and affiliates in French West and Equatorial Africa.

By 1948, he was elected general secretary of the Territorial Union of the Confédération Générale du Travail (CGT), and two years later, he was named general secretary of the coordinating committee of the (CGT) for French West Africa and French Togoland. In the 1951 elections, he campaigned with a coalition of the RDA, the UDSR and the recently founded Democratic Party of Guinea (Parti démocratique de Guinée or PDG, the RDA's Guinean section); however, the coalition performed poorly.

In 1952, he became the leader of the PDG. The RDA agitated for the decolonization of Africa, and included representatives from all the French West African colonies. The party forged alliance with labor unions and Touré was elected as secretary-general.

His greatest success as a trade union leader was when workers across French Guinea went on a 71-day general strike (longer than any other territories in the French West Africa) in 1953 to force the implementation of a new overseas labor code. He was later elected to Guinea's Territorial Assembly the same year. As a result, he was elected as one of the three secretaries-general of the French Communist Party's Confédération Générale du Travail (General Confederation of Labour; CGT) in 1954.

The PDG-RDA under Sékou Touré's leadership participated in the 1954 by-election, held after the death of Yacine Diallo. He lost to Diawadou Barry. The election was, however, marred with irregularities. The French minister Robert Buron admitted in 1968 that it had been rigged by France to prevent Sékou Touré from winning.

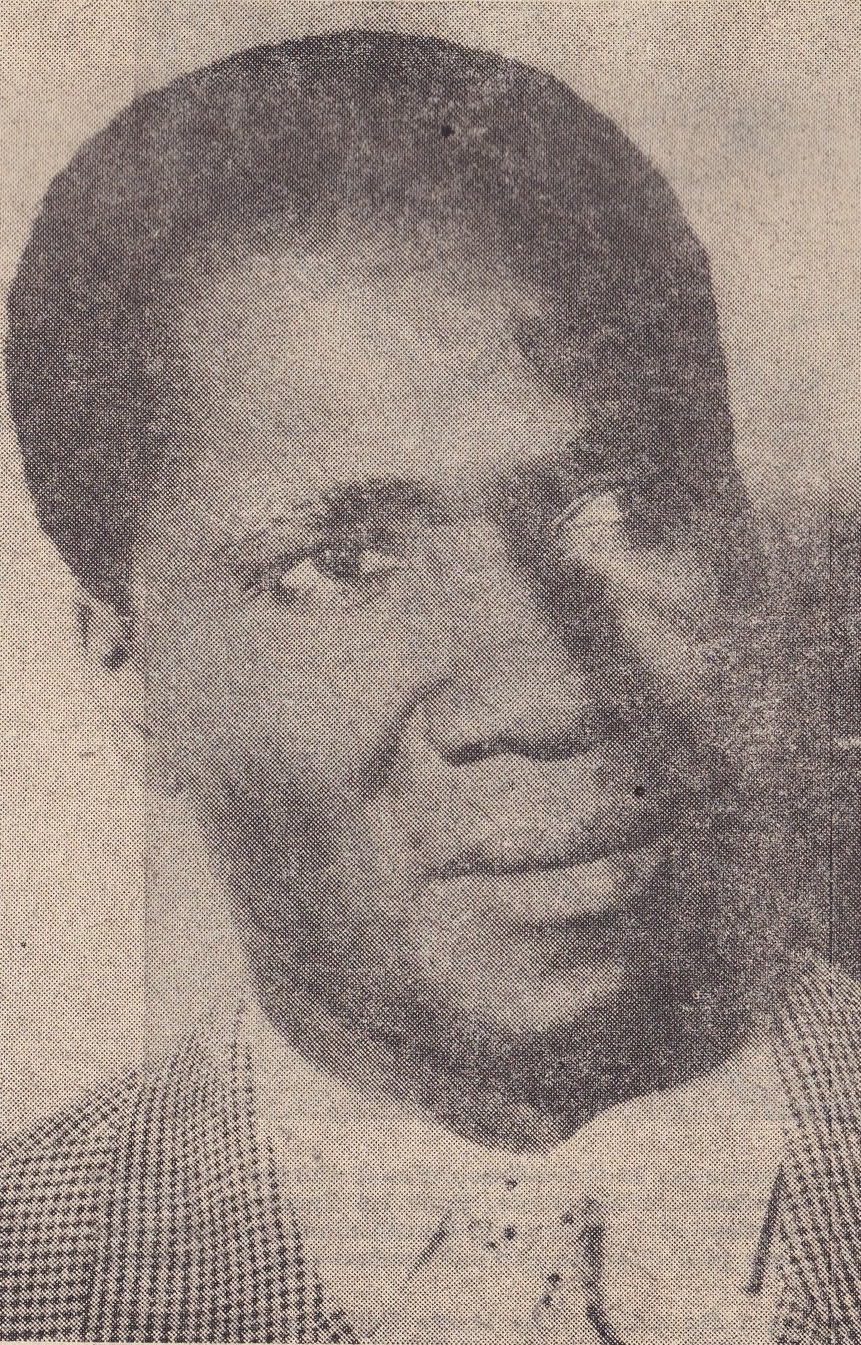
Sékou Touré in 1958

In 1957, he organized the Union Générale des Travailleurs d'Afrique Noire, a common trade union centre for French West Africa. He was a leader of the RDA, working closely with Félix Houphouët-Boigny, who later was elected as president of the Ivory Coast. In 1956, Touré was elected Guinea's deputy to the French National Assembly and mayor of Conakry, positions he used to criticize the French colonial regime.

Touré served for some time as a representative of African groups in France, where he worked to negotiate for the independence of France's African colonies.

In September 1958, Guinea participated in the referendum on the new Constitution of France. On acceptance of the new constitution, French overseas territories had the option of choosing to continue their existing status, to move toward full integration into metropolitan France, or to acquire the status of an autonomous republic in the new quasi-federal French Community. If, however, they rejected the new constitution, they would become independent forthwith. French President Charles de Gaulle made it clear that a country pursuing the independent course would no longer receive French economic and financial aid or retain French technical and administrative officers.

In 1958, Touré's PDG, pushed for a "No" in the French Union referendum sponsored by the French government. Upon hearing of Touré's choice on the matter, General de Gaulle responded, "Then all you have to do is vote 'no'. I pledge myself that nobody will stand in the way of your independence." The French also threatened to cut off all their aid to Guinea in the event that the colony voted to become independent of France. The electorate of Guinea rejected the new constitution overwhelmingly, and Guinea accordingly became an independent state on 2 October 1958, with Touré, leader of Guinea's strongest labor union, as president. Guinea was thus the only African colony to vote for immediate independence rather than continued association with France, and hence was the only French colony to decline participation in the new French Community when it became independent in 1958. In any event, the rest of Francophone Africa gained effective independence two years later in 1960.

In response to the vote for immediate and total independence, the French in Guinea were dramatic in severing ties with Guinea, with many French civil servants destroying Guinean infrastructure as they departed Guinea as an act of vengeance for Guineans voting to become independent. The Washington Post observed how brutal the French were in tearing down all what they thought was their contributions to Guinea: "In reaction, and as a warning to other French-speaking territories, the French pulled out of Guinea over a two-month period, taking everything they could with them. They unscrewed light bulbs, removed plans for sewage pipelines in Conakry, the capital, and even burned medicines rather than leave them for the Guineans."

== Presidency (1958–1984) ==
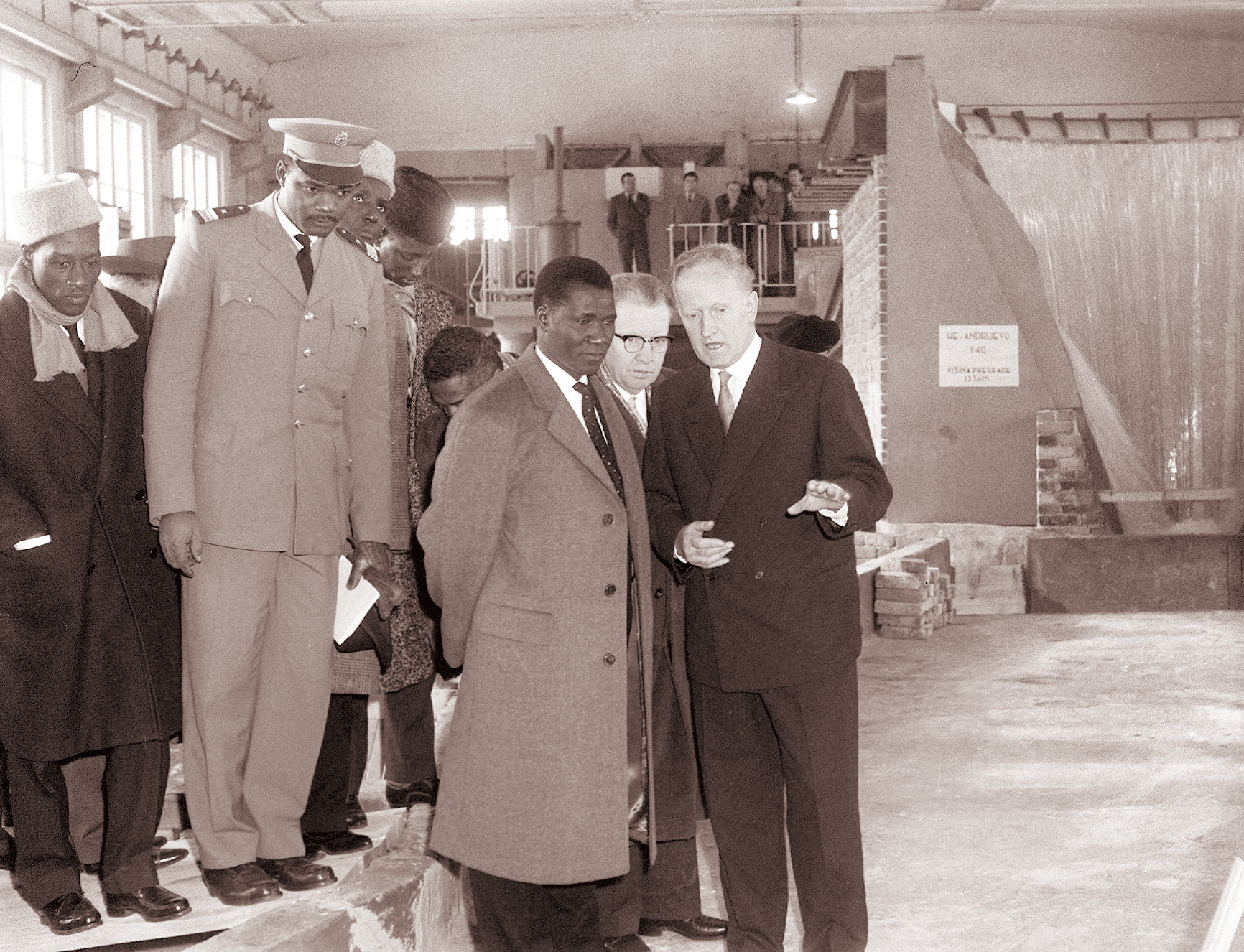
Sékou Touré visiting Yugoslavia in 1961

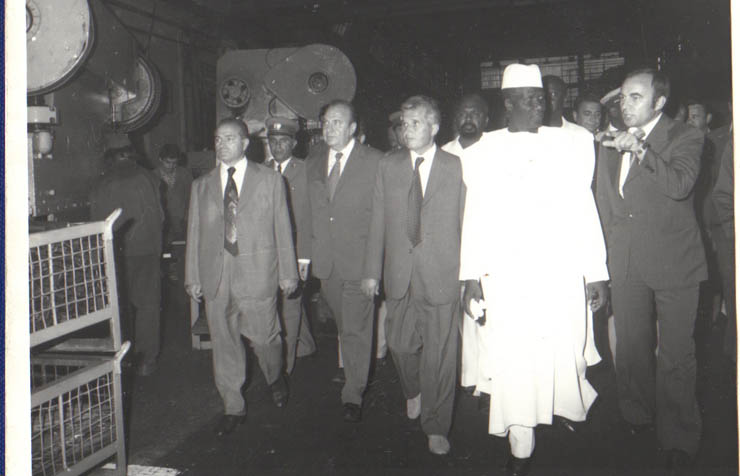
Sékou Touré visiting Romania in 1979

In 1960, Touré declared the PDG to be the only legal party, though the country had effectively been a one-party state since independence. For the next 24 years, Touré effectively held all governing power in the nation. He was elected to a seven-year term as president in 1961; as leader of the PDG he was the only candidate. He was reelected unopposed in 1968, 1974 and 1982. Every five years, a single list of PDG candidates was returned to the National Assembly.

During his presidency, Touré's policies were strongly based on socialism, with the nationalization of foreign companies and centralized economic plans. He won the Lenin Peace Prize as a result in 1961. His early actions to reject the French and then to appropriate wealth and farmland from traditional landlords angered many powerful forces, but the increasing failure of his government to provide either economic opportunities or democratic rights angered more. Famously, he stated that "Guinea prefers poverty in freedom to riches in slavery."

Guineans who had fled reported that Touré's regime "practices tyranny and torture on a daily basis". His approach towards his opponents caused charges to be brought from Amnesty International (as well as other human rights organizations), accusing his rule to be too oppressive. From 1965 to 1975 Touré ended all his government's relations with France, supposedly because of French involvement in the creation of opposition groups against his government.

Touré argued that Africa had lost much during colonization, and that Africa ought to retaliate by cutting off ties to former colonial nations. However, in 1978 Guinea's ties with the Soviet Union soured, and, as a sign of reconciliation, President of France Valéry Giscard d'Estaing visited Guinea, the first state visit by a French president.

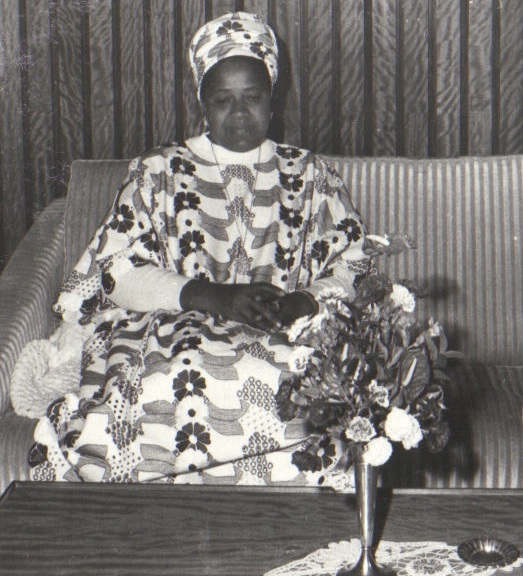
Andrée Touré, his wife and the first lady of Guinea

Throughout Touré's dispute with France, he maintained good relations with several socialist countries. However, Touré's attitude toward France was not generally well received by his own people and some other African countries ended diplomatic relations with Guinea over his actions. He also often voiced his distrust of other African nations. Meanwhile, some 1.5 million Guineans were fleeing Guinea to neighboring countries, such as Sierra Leone. Despite this, Touré's position won the support of many anti-colonialist and Pan-African groups and leaders.

Touré's primary allies in the region were presidents Kwame Nkrumah of Ghana and Modibo Keita of Mali. After Nkrumah was overthrown in a 1966 coup, Touré offered him asylum in Guinea and gave him the honorary title of co-president. He also declared Guinea to be in a "state of war" with Ghana, and that Guinean troops would march into Ghana to reinstate Nkrumah. Although such a war (which would have required the invasion of the Ivory Coast) never took place, Guinea still initiated hostilities, detaining several Ghanaian citizens. Ghana's assets in Guinea were also seized by Touré's government for Nkrumah's use. Major conflict was only halted after Ghana seized a flight carrying Foreign Minister Béavogui in October 1966, prompting the intervention of the Organisation of African Unity.

As a leader of the Pan-Africanist movement, Touré consistently spoke out against colonial powers, and befriended African American civil rights activists such as Malcolm X and Stokely Carmichael, to whom he offered asylum. Carmichael took the two leaders' names, as Kwame Ture.

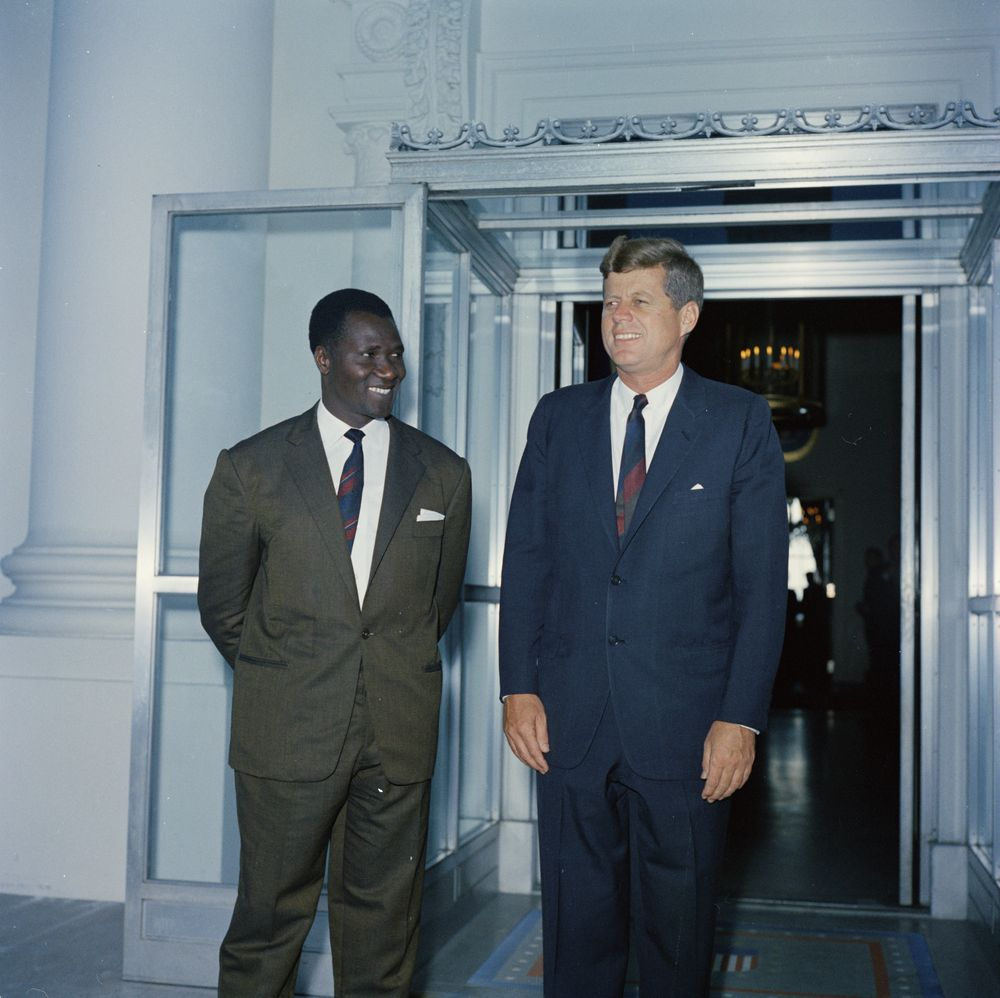
Sékou Touré with US President John F. Kennedy in October 1962

Touré had good relations with the United States under President John F. Kennedy. However, after Kennedy's assassination, the relationship with Washington somewhat soured. When a Guinean delegation was imprisoned in Ghana after the overthrow of Nkrumah, Touré blamed Washington. He feared that the Central Intelligence Agency, as well as the Soviet Union, were plotting against his own regime even though he was taking economic aid from both parties.

With Nkrumah, Touré helped in the formation of the All-African Peoples Revolutionary Party, and aided the PAIGC guerrillas in their fight against Portuguese colonialism in neighboring Portuguese Guinea. The Portuguese launched an attack upon Conakry in 1970 when some 350 men, under the leadership of Portuguese officers from Portuguese Guinea (now Guinea-Bissau), including FLNG partisans and African Portuguese soldiers, entered Guinea to rescue Portuguese prisoners of war, capture or kill rebel leader Amilcar Cabral, destroy PAIGC bases, and potentially overthrow Touré's regime. They succeeded in the rescue but the FLNG failed to dislodge Touré's regime. Touré directed waves of arrests, detentions, and some executions of known and suspected opposition leaders in Guinea followed this military operation.

Another of Touré's allies in Africa was Siaka Stevens of Sierra Leone. Relations between the two leaders were close to the point where Touré proposed unification in June 1970. Later, in the wake of the Portuguese military operation, Guinea and Sierra Leone announced a defense treaty in December 1970, which was signed the following year. This defense treaty was immediately invoked by Stevens in response to a failed coup in Sierra Leone, and Guinean troops were stationed in the country until 1974. Guinea would also sign a mutual defense pact with Gaddafi's Libya in December 1974.

During its first three decades of independence, Guinea developed into a militantly socialist state, which merged the functions and membership of the PDG with the various institutions of government, including the public state bureaucracy. This unified party-state had nearly complete control over the country's economic and political life. Guinea expelled the US Peace Corps in 1966 because of their alleged involvement in a plot to overthrow President Touré. Similar charges were directed against France; diplomatic relations were severed in 1965 and Touré did not renew them until 1975. Guinea also broke off diplomatic relations with West Germany in January 1971 after accusing it of involvement in the Portuguese raid of 1970. Throughout that year, a major government purge and mass campaign was launched against "imperialism" and the supposed "SS-Nazi network" of West Germany, implicating many high-ranking officials and generals.

An ongoing source of contention between Guinea and its French-speaking neighbors was the estimated half-million expatriates in Senegal and Ivory Coast; some were active dissidents who, in 1966, formed the National Liberation Front of Guinea (Front de Libération Nationale de Guinée, or FLNG).

In Le Français est à nous! (French language belongs to us!), French university teachers Maria Candéa an Laélia Véron praise Touré for having made official eight local languages of Guinea. They describe his linguistic policy as "très ambitieuse" (very ambitious).

Between 1969 and 1976, according to Amnesty International, 4,000 persons in Guinea were detained for political reasons, with the fate of 2,900 unknown. After an alleged Fulani plot to assassinate Touré was disclosed in May 1976, Diallo Telli, a cabinet minister and formerly the first secretary-general of the OAU, was arrested and sent to prison. He died without trial in November of that year.

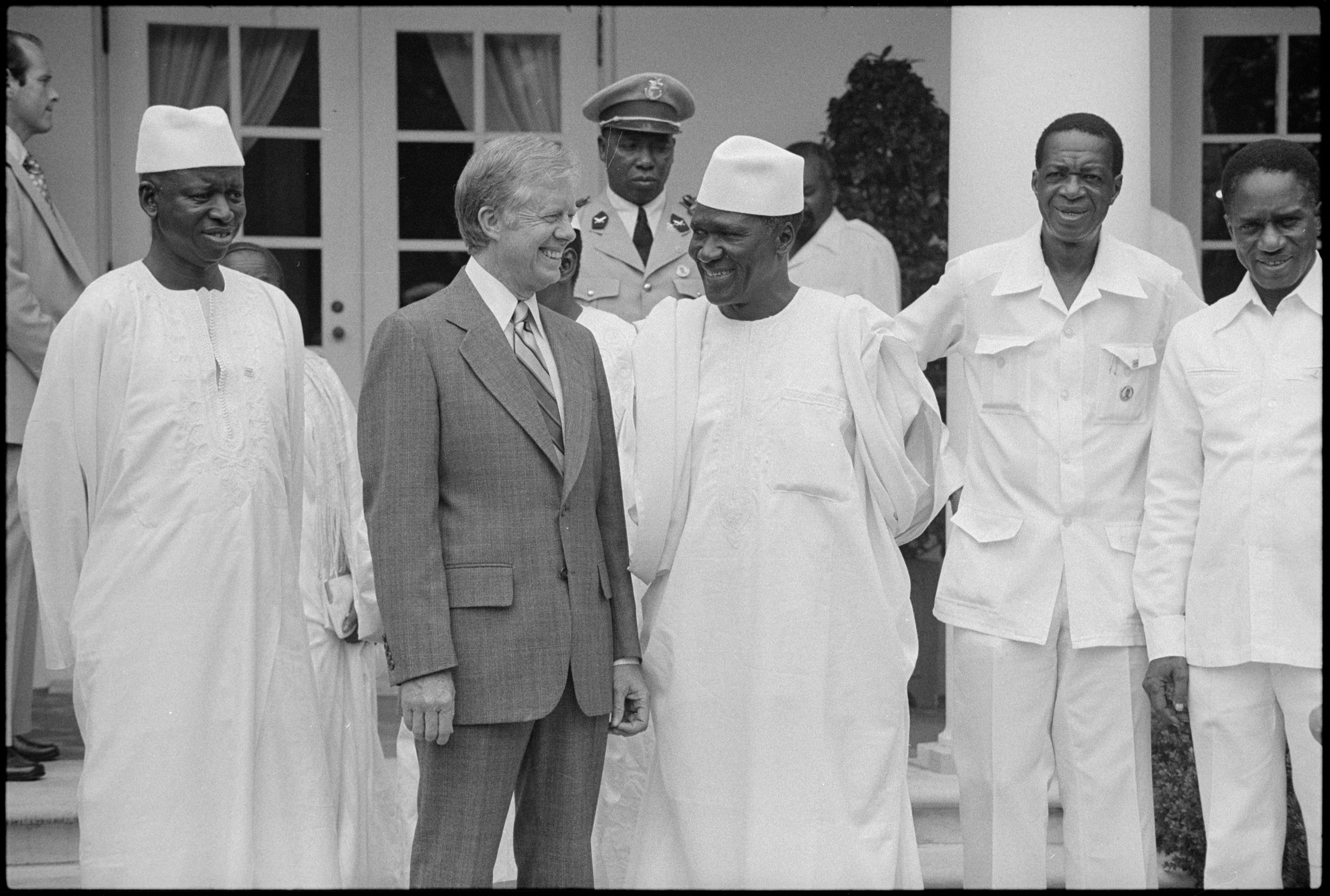
U.S. President Jimmy Carter welcoming Sékou Touré outside the White House, Washington, D.C., 1979

In 1977, protests against the regime's economic policy, which dealt harshly with unauthorized trading, led to riots in which three regional governors were killed. Touré responded by relaxing restrictions on trading, offering amnesty to exiles (thousands of whom returned), and releasing hundreds of political prisoners. Relations with the Soviet bloc grew cooler, as Touré sought to increase Western aid and private investment for Guinea's sagging economy.

He imprisoned or exiled his strongest opposition leaders. Large numbers of suspected political opponents were imprisoned in concentration camps, such as the notorious Camp Boiro in Conakry. In 2002, mass graves were discovered near Kindia containing hundreds of bodies. Most of the victims were killed on 17 and 18 October 1971 by Touré's regime. One grave reportedly contained 400 bodies.

Estimates for number killed by Touré's regime vary widely. According to human rights organisations, including Amnesty International and Guinean groups such as the Camp Boiro Memorial organization, around 50,000 people were killed. Some scholars and international agencies have provided significantly lower estimates, with a US House of Representatives report placing the number at around 5,000 killed.

Domestically, Sékou Touré pursued socialist economic policies, including nationalizations of banks, energy and transportation; in foreign affairs, he joined the Non-Aligned Movement and developed very close relations with Mao Zedong and the People's Republic of China.

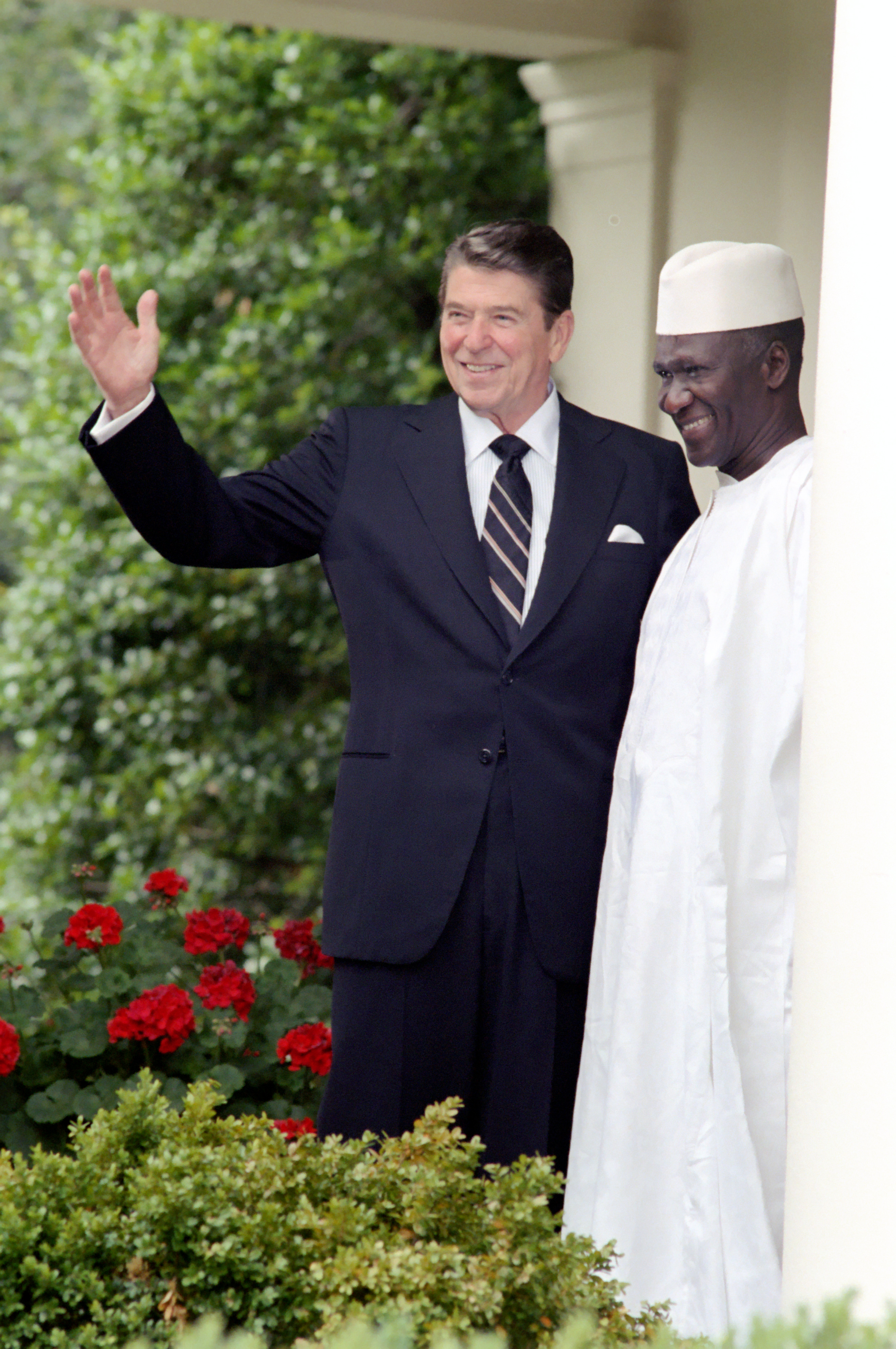
Sékou Touré with U.S. President Ronald Reagan, 1982

Once Guinea began its rapprochement with France in the late 1970s, Marxists among Touré's supporters began to oppose his government's shift toward capitalist liberalisation. In 1978, Touré formally renounced Marxism and reestablished trade with the West.

Single-list elections for an expanded National Assembly were held in 1980. Touré was elected unopposed to a fourth seven-year term as president on 9 May 1982. A new constitution was adopted that month, and during the summer Touré visited the United States. While in Washington, Touré urged for more American private investment in Guinea, and claimed that the country had "fabulous economic potential" due to its mineral reserves. This was taken by US diplomats to be a confession of the failure of Marxism. It was part of his economic policy change that led him to seek Western investment in order to develop Guinea's huge mineral reserves. At the same time, however, the annual average income of Guineans was US$140 (equivalent to US$434 in 2025), life expectancy was only at 41 years, and the literacy rate was only 10%. Measures announced in 1983 brought further economic liberalization, including the delegation of produce marketing to private traders.

== Death ==
Touré died of an apparent heart attack on 26 March 1984 while undergoing cardiac treatment in the United States, at the Cleveland Clinic in Cleveland, Ohio, for emergency heart surgery; he had been rushed to the United States after being stricken in Saudi Arabia the previous day. Touré's tomb is at the Camayanne Mausoleum, situated within the gardens of the Grand Mosque of Conakry.

Prime Minister Louis Lansana Béavogui became acting president, pending elections that were to be held within 45 days. The Political Bureau of the ruling Guinea Democratic Party was due to name its choice as Touré's successor on 3 April 1984. Under the constitution, the PDG's new leader would have been automatically elected to a seven-year term as president and confirmed in office by the voters by the end of spring. Just hours before that meeting took place, the military seized power in a coup d'état. They denounced the last years of Touré's rule as a "bloody and ruthless dictatorship." The constitution was suspended, the National Assembly dissolved, and the PDG abolished. Colonel Lansana Conté, leader of the coup, assumed the presidency on 5 April, heading the Military Committee of National Restoration (Comité Militaire de Redressement National—CMRN). The military junta freed about 1,000 political prisoners.

In 1985 Conté took advantage of an alleged coup attempt to arrest and execute several of Sékou Touré's close associates, including Ismael Touré, Mamadi Keïta, Siaka Touré, former commander of Camp Boiro; and Moussa Diakité.

== Desecration of Touré's tomb ==
On 14 July 2020, his grave was desecrated by an unknown person. According to a relative of the CEO of the GDR who went to the scene of the desecration, the individual set fire to the tricolor which was in the grave. Then he began to pour liquid into the burial place. The next day his widow lamented the act of desecration. She herself clarified that the mausoleum belongs to her clan and that it is abandoned without security. She considered hiring security personnel.

== Awards and honours ==
=== Foreign awards and honours ===
| Ribbon | Distinction | Country | Date | Reference |
|---|---|---|---|---|
| | Grand Cross of the Order of Merit of the Federal Republic of Germany | West Germany | 1959 | |
| | Collar of the Order of the White Lion | Czechoslovakia | 30 November 1959 | |
| | Order of the Yugoslav Great Star | Yugoslavia | 7 January 1961 | |
| | Lenin Peace Prize | Soviet Union | 30 April 1961 | |
| | Grand Cross of the Legion of Honour | France | 20 December 1978 | |
| | Collar of the Order of Civil Merit | Spain | 10 May 1979 | |
| | Supreme Companion of the Order of the Companions of O. R. Tambo | South Africa | 16 June 2004 (posthumously) | |
| | Grand Officer of the Order Agostinho Neto | Angola | 6 November 2025 (posthumously) | |

== Works by Touré (partial) ==
- Ahmed Sékou Touré. 8 novembre 1964 (Conakry) : Parti démocratique de Guinée, (1965)
- A propos du Sahara Occidental : intervention du président Ahmed Sékou Touré devant le 17^{e} sommet de l'OUA, Freetown, le 3 juillet 1980. (S.l. : s.n., 1980)
- Address of President Ahmed Sékou Touré, President of the Republic of Guinee [sic] : suggestions submitted during the West Africa consultative regional meeting held at Conakry, during 19 and 20 November 1971. (Cairo : Permanent Secretariat of the Afro-Asian Peoples' Solidarity Organization, 1971)
- Afrika and imperialism. Newark, N.J. : Jihad Pub. Co., 1973.
- Conférences, discours et rapports, Conakry : Impr. du Gouvernement, (1958–)
- Congres général de l'U.G.T.A.N. (Union général des travailleurs de l'Afrique noire) : Conakry, 15–18 janvier 1959 : rapport d'orientation et de doctrine. (Paris) : Présence africaine, c1959.
- Discours de Monsieur Sékou Touré, Président du Conseil de Gouvernement des 28 juillet et 25 aout 1958, de Monsieur Diallo Saifoulaye, Président de l'Assemblée territoriale et du Général de Gaulle, Président du Gouvernement de la Républ (Conakry) : Guinée Française, (1958)
- Doctrine and methods of the Democratic Party of Guinea (Conakry 1963).
- Expérience guinéenne et unité africaine. Paris, Présence africaine (1959)
- Guinée-Festival / commentaire et montage, Wolibo Dukuré dit Grand-pére. Conakry : Commission Culturelle du Comité Central, 1983.
- Guinée, prélude à l'indépendance (Avant-propos de Jacques Rabemananjara) Paris, Présence africaine (1958)
- Hommage à la révolution Cubaine; Message du camarade Ahmed Sekou Toure au peuple Cubain à l'occasion du 20^{e} anniversaire de l'attaque de la Caserne de Moncada (Juillet 1973). Conakry : Bureau de Presse de la Presidence de la Republique, (1975).
- Ahmed Sékou Touré. International policy and diplomatic action of the Democratic Party of Guinea; extracts from the report on doctrine and orientation submitted to the 3d National Conference of the P.D.G. (Cairo, Société Orientale de Publicité-Press, 1962)
- Ahmed Sékou Touré. Opening speech of the Summit of Heads of State and Government by President Ahmed Sékou Touré, chairman of the Summit (20 November 1980). (S.l. : s.n., 1980)
- Ahmed Sékou Touré. Poèmes militants. (Conakry, Guinea) : Parti démocratique de Guinée, 1964
- Ahmed Sékou Touré. Political leader considered as the representative of a culture. (Newark, N. J. : Jihad Productions, 19--)
- Ahmed Sékou Touré. Pour l'amitié algéro-guinéenne. (Conakry, Guinea : Parti démocratique de Guinée, 1972)
- Rapport de doctrine et de politique générale, Conakry : Imprimerie Nationale, 1959.
- Strategy and tactics of the revolution, Conakry, Guinea : Press Office, 1978.
- Unité nationale, Conakry, République de Guinée (B.P. 1005, Conakry, République de Guinée) : Bureau de presse de la Présidence de la République, 1977.

== See also ==
- Politics of Guinea
- 1963 visit by Sékou Touré to the Republic of the Congo
- Palais présidentiel Sekhoutoureah

Political offices
| Preceded by Position created | President of Guinea; 1958–1984 | Succeeded by Louis Lansana Beavogui (interim) |
