= Democratic Party of Guinea – African Democratic Rally =

Political party in Guinea

Democratic Party of Guinea – African Democratic Rally Parti Démocratique de Guinée-Rassemblement Démocratique Africain
- Abbreviation: PDG-RDA
- Leader: Ismael Gushein
- Founder: Ahmed Sékou Touré
- Founded: June 1947
- Dissolved: 7 March 2026
- Headquarters: Conakry, Guinea
- Newspaper: Horoya
- Ideology: African nationalism African socialism Pan-Africanism; Ethno-nationalism; Marxism (until 1978); Integral nationalism Democratic centralism
- Political position: Left-wing
- International affiliation: African Democratic Rally

The Democratic Party of Guinea – African Democratic Rally (PDG-RDA; French: Parti Démocratique de Guinée-Rassemblement Démocratique Africain) was a political party in Guinea that dominated Guinean politics under a one-party state system from 1960 to 1984.

The PDG-RDA was founded as a branch of the African Democratic Rally (RDA) in June 1947. On 19 October 1958, the party severed its links with the RDA, other members of which supported a closer union with France. The party's leader, Ahmed Sékou Touré, became the first president of Guinea. Two years later, he declared the PDG to be the sole legal party in the country. As president of the PDG, Touré was the only candidate for president of the republic, and as such was elected unopposed to four seven-year terms. Every five years, a single list of PDG candidates was returned to the National Assembly. After the death of Touré and a coup staged by Lansana Conté in 1984, the PDG was dissolved.

In 1992, PDG-RDA was revived under the leadership of Ismael Gushein, however, the revived PDG-RDA did not see much success in Guinean elections. The party was dissolved in 2026 by the government of president Mamady Doumbouya.

== Electoral history ==
=== Presidential elections ===
Election	Party candidate	Votes	%	Result
1961	Ahmed Sékou Touré	1,576,580	100%	Elected ✓
1968	Ahmed Sékou Touré	1,990,726	100%	Elected ✓
1974	Ahmed Sékou Touré	2,432,129	100%	Elected ✓
1982	Ahmed Sékou Touré	3,063,692	100%	Elected ✓
1993	Ismael Gushein	11,696	0.6%	Lost ✗

=== National Assembly elections ===
Election	Party leader	Votes		%	Seats	+/–	Position	Result
1957	Ahmed Sékou Touré	584,438		77.4%	56 / 60	▲56	▲1st	Supermajority government
1963	Ahmed Sékou Touré			100%	75 / 75	▲19	1st	Sole legal party
1968	Ahmed Sékou Touré	1,990,726		100%	75 / 75	Steady	1st	Sole legal party
1974	Ahmed Sékou Touré	2,432,129		100%	150 / 150	▲75	1st	Sole legal party
1980	Ahmed Sékou Touré	2,393,600		100%	210 / 210	▲60	1st	Sole legal party
1995	Ismael Gushein	Proportional	57,942	3%	2 / 114	▼208	▼6th	Opposition
1995	Ismael Gushein	Constituency			2 / 114	▼208	▼6th	Opposition
2002	Ismael Gushein	Proportional	107,666	3.4%	3 / 114	▲1	▲4th	Opposition
2002	Ismael Gushein	Constituency			3 / 114	▲1	▲4th	Opposition
2013	Ismael Gushein	Constituency	19,603	0.66%	0 / 114	▼3	▼20rd	Extra-parliamentary
2013	Ismael Gushein	Proportional	10,539	0.33%	0 / 114	▼3	▼20rd	Extra-parliamentary
2020	Ismael Gushein	Constituency			1 / 114	▲1	▼23rd	Opposition
2020	Ismael Gushein	Proportional	27,640	0.96%	1 / 114	▲1	▼23rd	Opposition

== See also ==
- African Democratic Party of Guinea
