= Gberedou/Hamana =

Region in Guinea

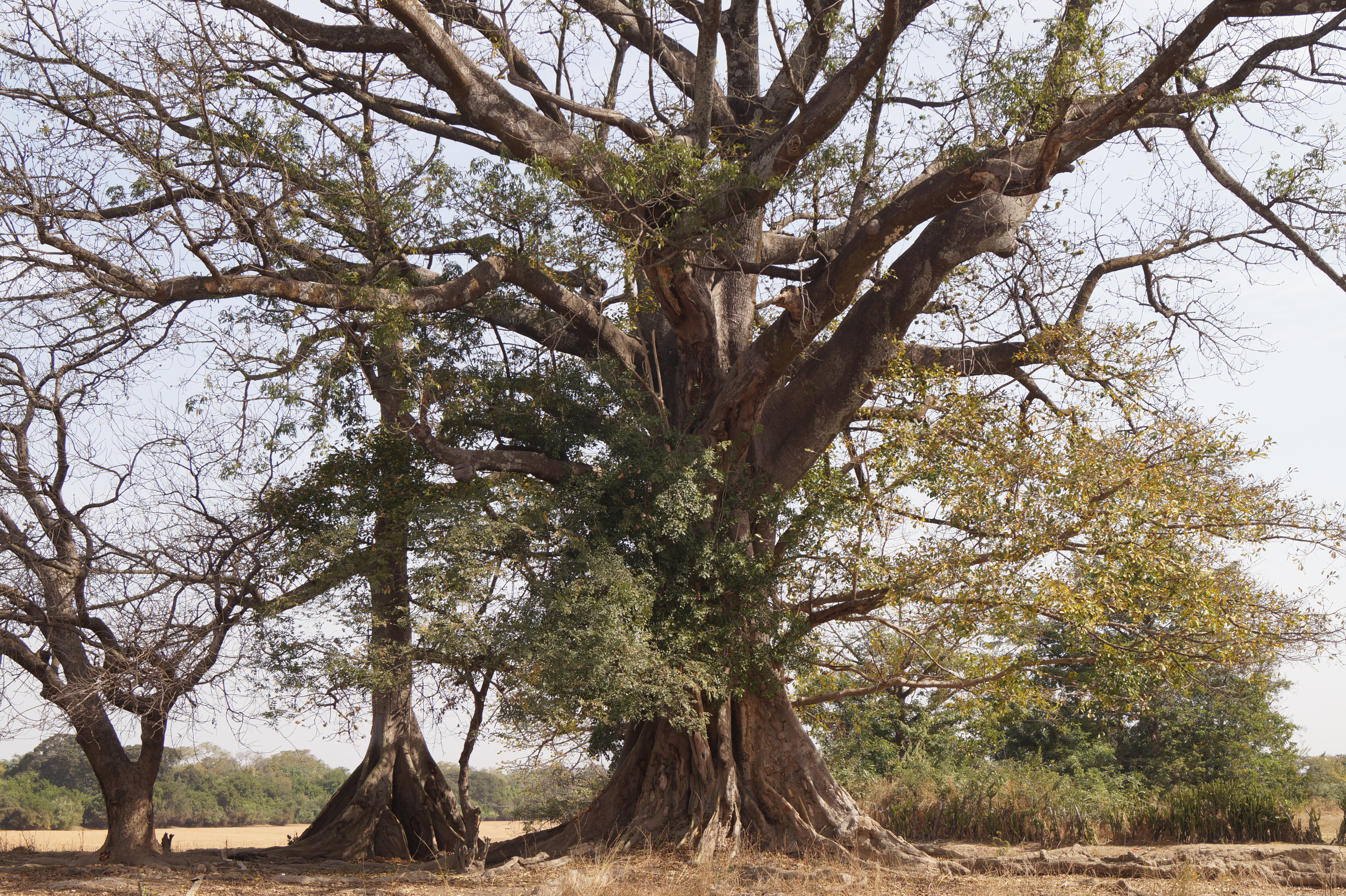
Baobab's samba RA

The Gberedou/ Hamana region of Guinea is located roughly 50 km to the northeast of Kouroussa and 40 km southwest of Kankan. The area has exceptional spiritual significance as it harbors a traditional Mandingo religious milieu. In addition, the Gberedou/ Hamana region supports a unique architectural style of residential structures.

== Site Description ==
Baro, Koumana, and Balato are the three principal villages of the region, but sacred pools are also important components of the cultural landscape where grand ceremonies are performed every year.

== World Heritage Status ==
This site was added to the UNESCO World Heritage Tentative List on March 29, 2001 in the Cultural category.
