= Ourembaya =

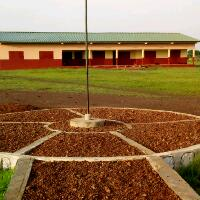
- Interactive map of Ourembaya
- Coordinates: 10°16′12″N 9°20′37″W
- Country: Guinea
- State: Kankan

Population (2022)
  - Total: 4,774
- Website: www.ourembaya.fr

Ourembaya is a village of Mandinka people of Guinea, located at 12 kilometers south of Kankan.

== Toponymy ==
Ourembaya village is also known as Wourembaya, Ouranbaya, Ourembaia and Ourimbaya

== History ==
Ourembaya has been a historic village in Guinea for centuries .. Historical writings Samori Toure demonstrate the importance of Ourembaya in the region

Moreover, he is known by the legend of Ourembaya Balla of Laminigbe Bayo (Guinea) and of Ramatta Diakité (Mali).

== Geography ==
Ourembaya is located at 380 meters altitude, on the right bank of the Milo, the main river that crosses the Upper Guinea and becomes the River Niger (or Djoliba in Mandingo), when he enters the Mali.

It's limited:

- north by Dabola (Kankan) at 9 min in car and at a distance of 5.6 km;
- to the northeast by Sadia (Kankan) at 17 min by car and at a distance of 12.8 km;
- to the south-east Tintioulen (Kankan) at 30 minutes by the national road 1 over a distance of 29.1 km, and by a local route in 39 min over a distance of 30.1 km;
- to the south by Ouleke-Kiniero to 6.7 km, by Sirimaya at 8.6 km and southwest by Borofian at 18.6 km, by Balandou at 3 min by car and at a distance of 2.2 km and north-west by Makono at a distance of 30.7 km through the national road 6.

=== Climate ===
Ourembaya has a savannah climate according to the Köppen classification. The mean annual temperature is 26.2 °C. Precipitation, much more in summer than in winter, is on average 1083.9 mm.

=== Demographics ===
The Ourembayakas – inhabitants of Ourembaya – speak Malinké. In 2014, the population counted 3781 people.

=== Transport ===
Ourembaya is accessible:

- by air transport via Kankan;
- by road transport;
- by canoe from Makono (not far from Koumban);
- by train previously via the Conakry to Kankan railway.

== Economy ==
Ourembaya is a predominantly agricultural village. Its inhabitants mainly cultivate fonio, cassava, yam, mahogany, shea butter, etc. Market gardening is a sector undergoing modernization.

Breeding is also practiced.

Plantations in Ourembaya.

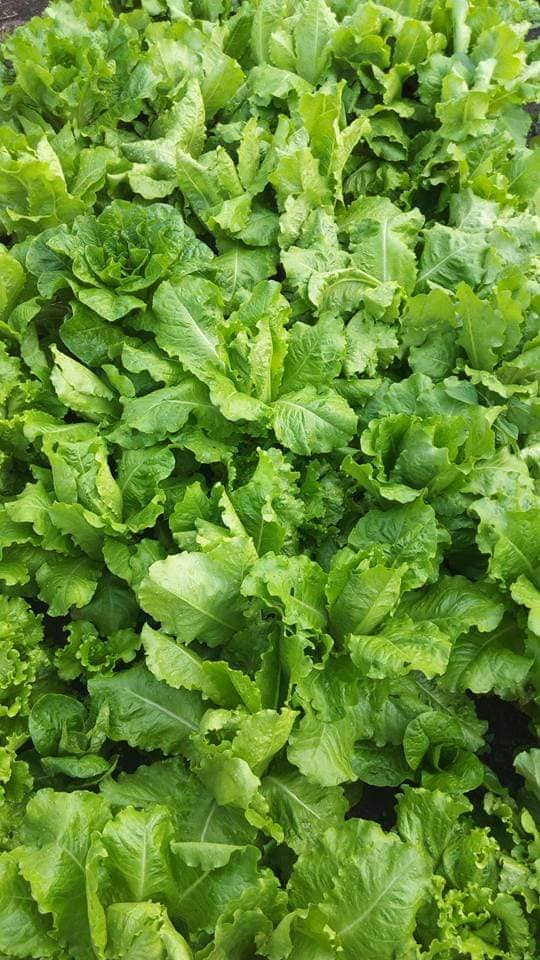
Ourembaya garden, market garden

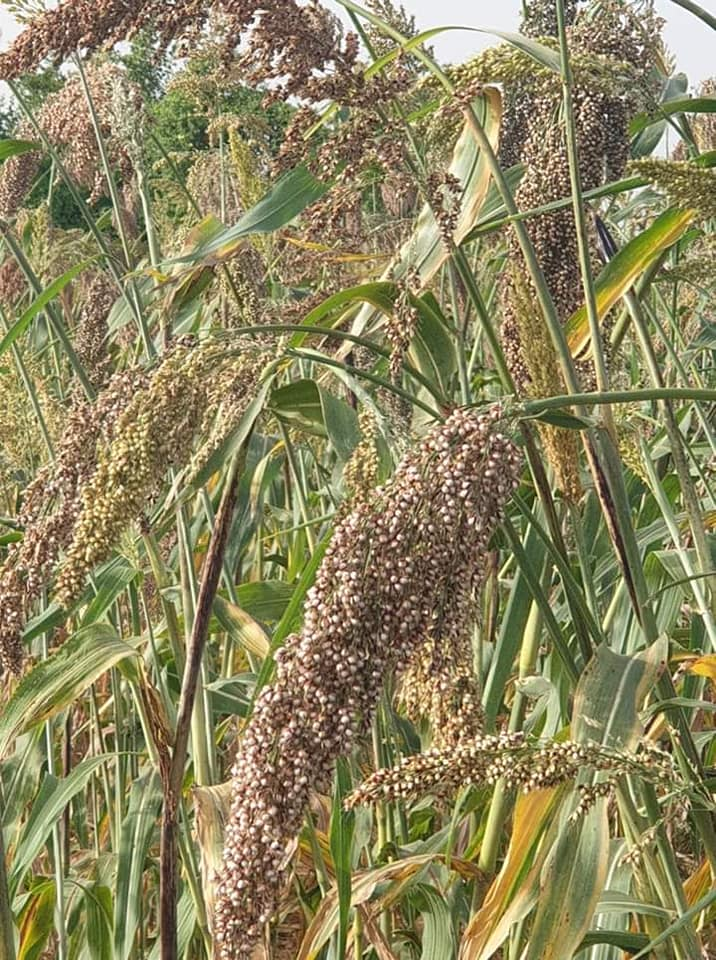
Ourembaya garden, sorghum

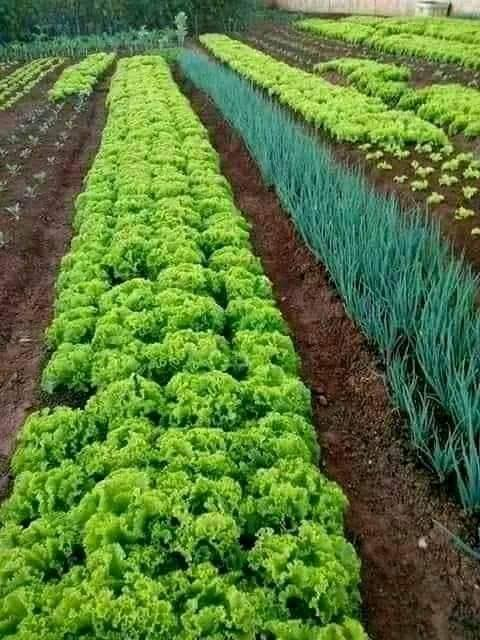
Ourembaya garden, market garden

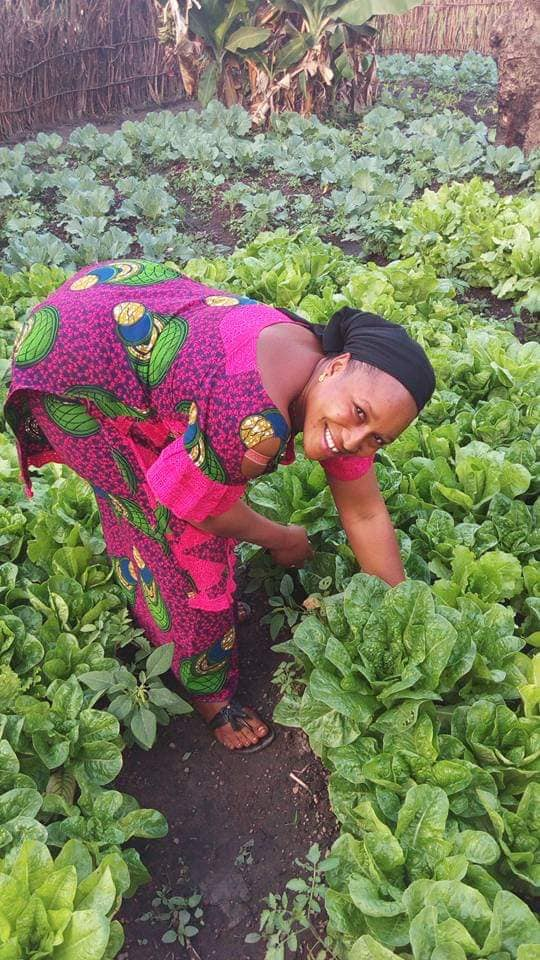
Ourembaya garden, market garden

== Culture ==
The Ourembayakas practice doundoumba (or dundumba ), also called "the dance of the strong men ".

The feast of the ponds is the festive period of Ourembaya. Indeed, as in several other Guinean localities, the ponds are considered as mystical and cultural places where the residents practice traditional fishing only once a year, before proceeding to a ceremony invoking the divinities of these ponds, from which they hope the graces.

Sacred mask of the Malinkés, the Kondén appears at the end of the Ramadan celebrations and all the villagers surround him Dave Kobrenski, « Konden », in Djoliba crossing : journeys into West African music and culture, Artemisia Books, New Hampshire, USA, 2013, p. 136-139 ISBN 9780982668900.

Kondén masks.

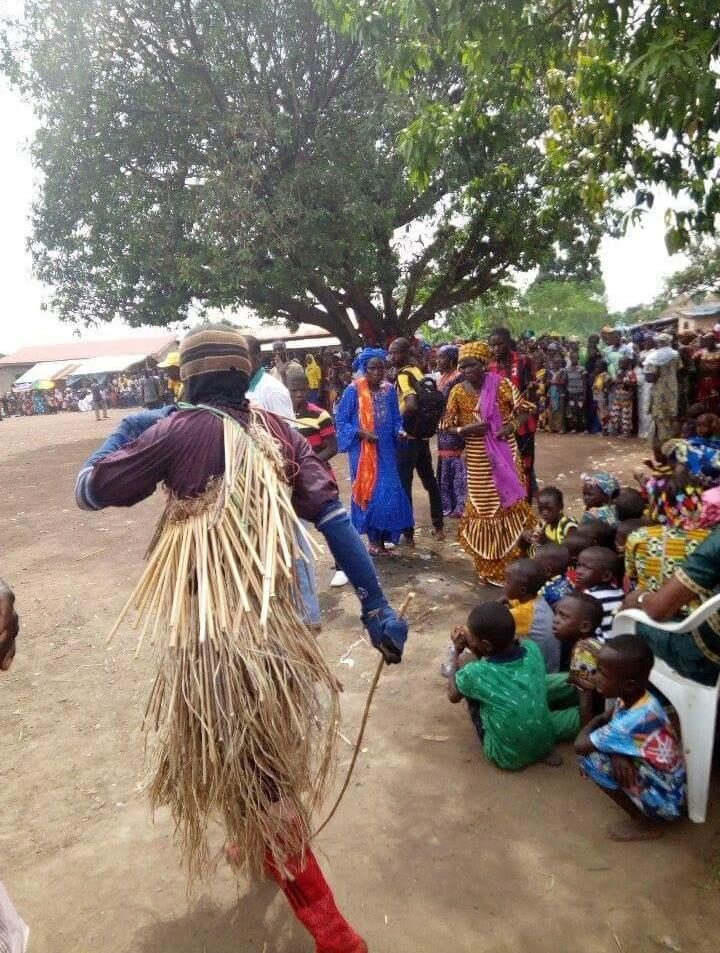

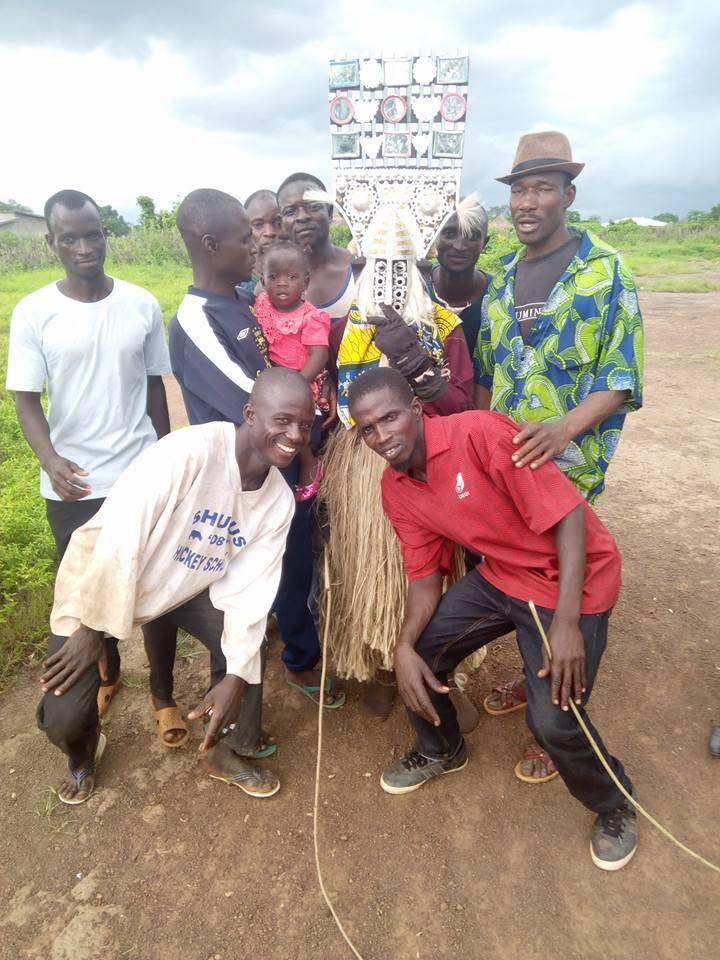

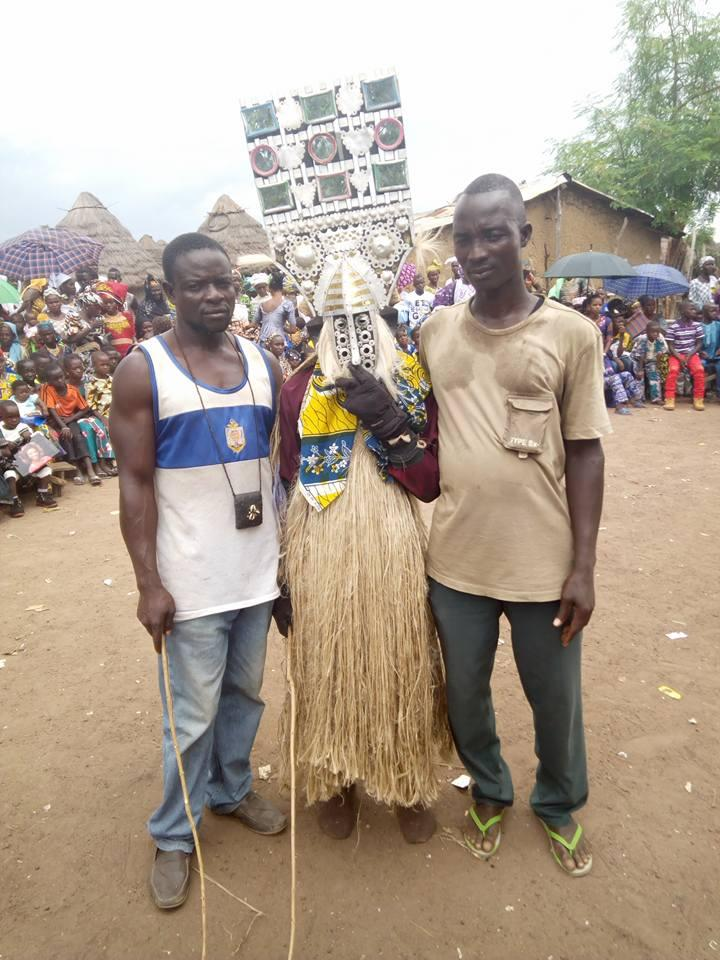

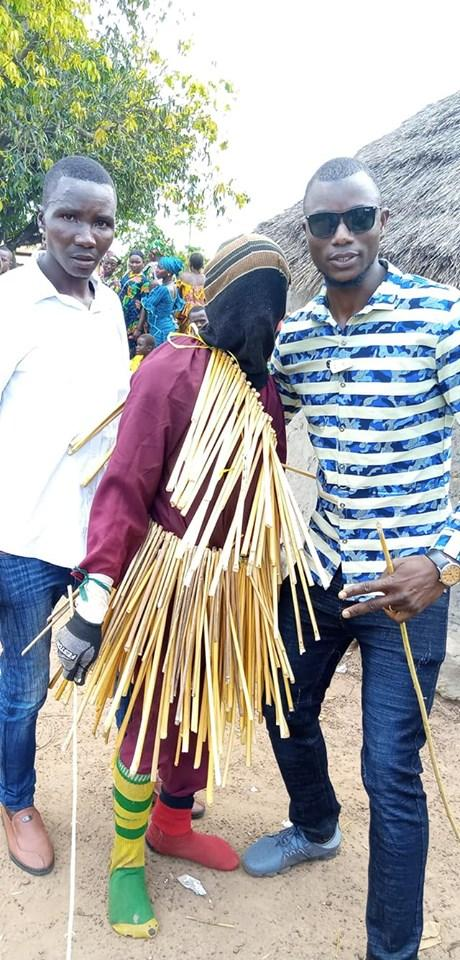

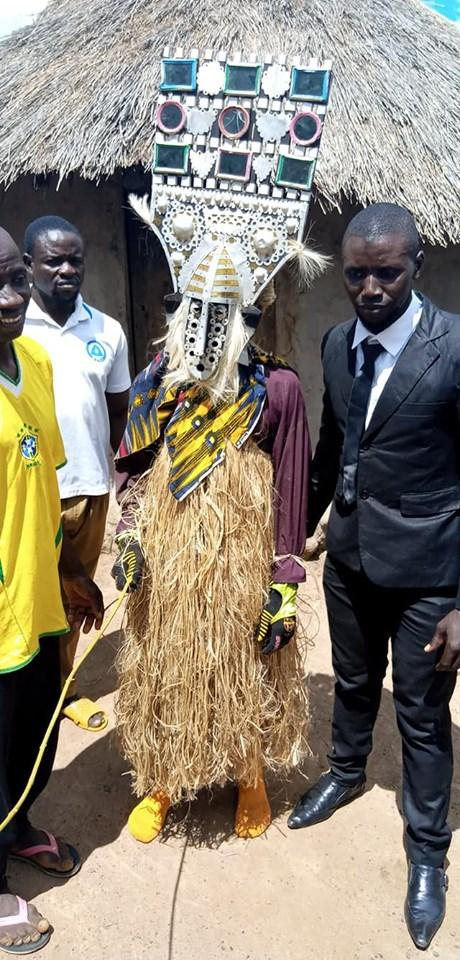

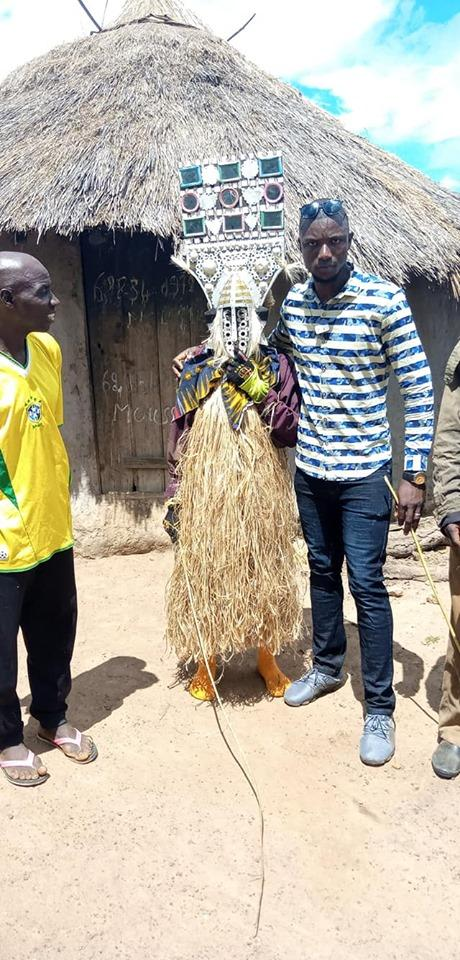

== U.D.O : Union Diaspora Ourembaya ==
U.D.O is the association aims to bring together, the diaspora of Ourembaya, friends and supporters of the village of Ourembaya, with the aims of developing Ourembaya on all levels: educational, scientific, cultural, socio-economic and environmental.

Projet U.D.O 2022, Laminigbe Bayo, reforestation of the Kouradalaba pond.

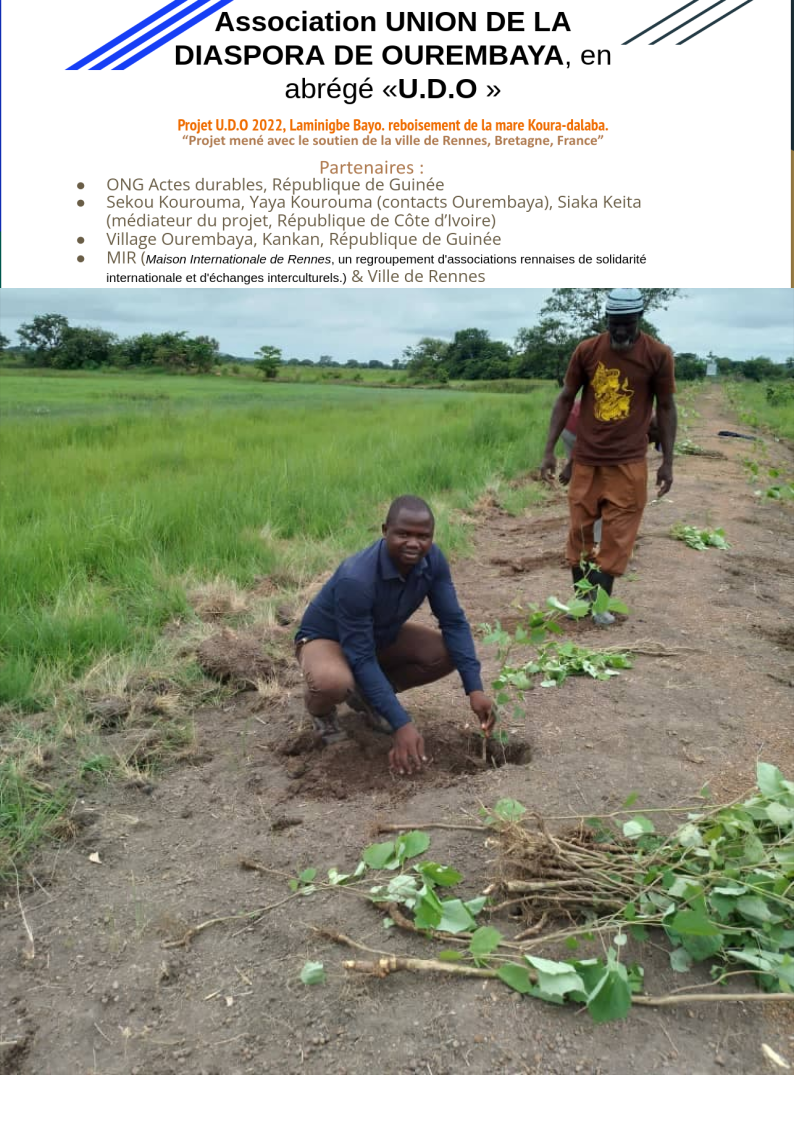

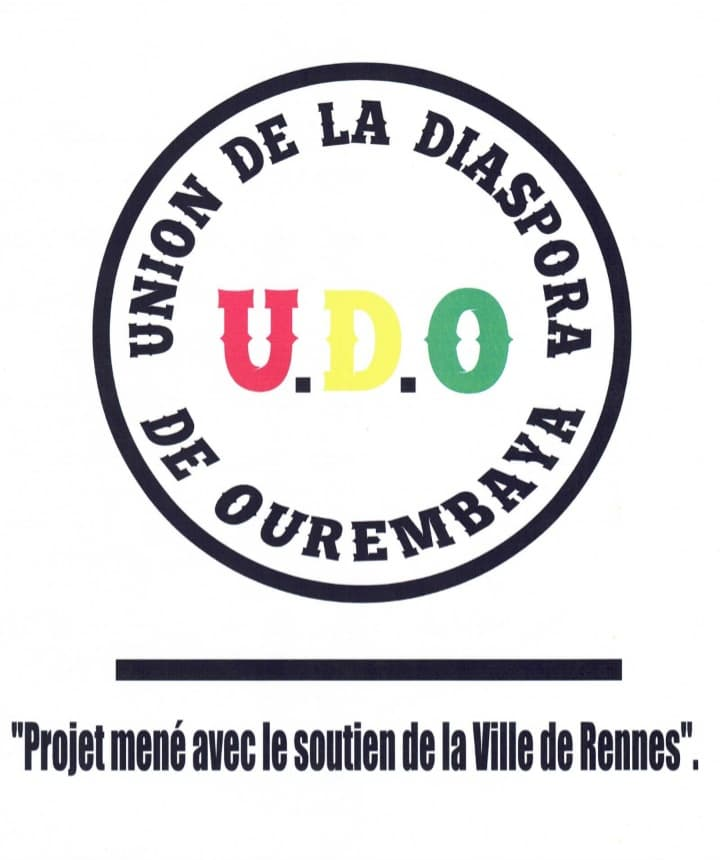

This project is a reforestation project as part of its ecological objectives and a sporting event as part of its cultural objectives.

1. Carry out a project to reforest 2,550 trees (Gmelina arborea)) in the Kouradalaba and dalamankan pond of Ourembaya.

2. Organize a sports tournament and equip the Ourembaya football team.

This project is carried out with the support of the city of Rennes, Brittany France.

1 an du Projet U.D.O 2022, reforestation of the Kouradalaba pond.

== Education ==
Ourembaya's first public primary school was established in 1959 and a new modern college (Djene Kaba Conde) was established in 2017.

School infrastructure.

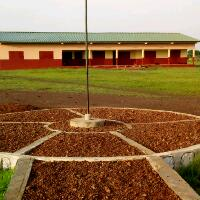
College Djene Kaba Conde of Ourembaya

== Places of worship ==
There are three mosques in the village.

== Notes et references ==
site officiel
