= Dialakoro, Guinea =

Dialakoro, Guinea may refer to:

- Dialakoro, Faranah - town and sub-prefecture in Dinguiraye Prefecture, Faranah Region, Guinea
- Dialakoro, Kankan - town and sub-prefecture in Mandiana Prefecture, Kankan Region, Guinea
