= Guinean nationality law =

Guinean Nationality Law

National Assembly of Guinea
- Long title: Code civil de la Republique de Guinée — Titre IV: de la nationalité, Articles 50–179
- Enacted by: Government of Guinea
- Assented to: 5 October 2019
- Status: Current legislation

Guinean nationality law is regulated by the Constitution of Guinea, as amended; the Guinean Nationality Code, and its revisions; the Civil Code of Guinea; the Family Code of Guinea; and various international agreements to which the country is a signatory. These laws determine who is, or is eligible to be, a national of Guinea. The legal means to acquire nationality, formal legal membership in a nation, differ from the domestic relationship of rights and obligations between a national and the nation, known as citizenship. Nationality describes the relationship of an individual to the state under international law, whereas citizenship is the domestic relationship of an individual within the nation. Guinean nationality is typically obtained under the principle of jus soli, i.e. by birth in Guinea, or jus sanguinis, i.e. by birth in Guinea or abroad to parents with Guinean nationality. It can be granted to persons with an affiliation to the country, or to a permanent resident who has lived in the country for a given period of time through naturalization.

== Acquisition of nationality ==
Nationality can be acquired in Guinea at birth or later in life through naturalization.

=== By birth ===
Those who acquire nationality at birth include:

- Children born anywhere to at least one parent with Guinean nationality;
- Children legally adopted by a Guinean parent, at the time of completion of a legal adoption automatically derive Guinean nationality;
- Children born in Guinea who have a parent who was also born in Guinea, regardless of the parent's original nationality;
- Abandoned children or orphans, whose parents are unknown, and were discovered in the territory, are assumed to have had Guinean parents unless proven otherwise; or
- Children born in the territory who would otherwise be stateless.

=== By naturalization ===
Naturalization can be granted to persons who have resided in the territory for a sufficient period of time to confirm they understand the customs and traditions of Guinea. General provisions are that applicants have good character and conduct; have no criminal convictions which resulted in a sentence of more than one year; are in good physical and mental health; and have adequate means to be self-sufficient. Applicants must typically have resided in the country for five years. Besides foreigners meeting the criteria, other persons who may be naturalized include:

- Adoptees whose adoption is informal, are allowed to naturalize;
- Persons born in Guinea who did not acquire nationality prior to age sixteen can naturalize after demonstrating five year's residency prior to the request;
- The spouse(s) of a Guinean national after five years of marriage and three years of residency in Guinea, provided at the time of the request the marriage has not dissolved. Should they have a child, the marriage period is reduced to three years; (Note: The civil code and allows a husband to have up to four wives, as long as the number is dislosed and the wife consents during the ceremony. Legalization of polygamy allowed subsequent wives to have the same civil and legal rights as other married women.)
- Minor children can be automatically naturalized when their parent acquires nationality; or
- Persons who have performed exceptional service to the nation without a residency period.

== Loss of nationality ==
Guinean nationals can renounce their nationality pending approval by the state. Guineans of origin may lose their nationality for voluntarily acquiring another nationality or participating in actions, like voting or serving in public office, that indicates they are the national of another country. Naturalized persons may be denaturalized in Guinea for disloyalty to the state; committing crimes against the state or state security; ordinary crimes; residing outside of the country; or for fraud, misrepresentation, or concealment in a naturalization petition. Persons who previously had nationality and wish to repatriate if they voluntarily lost their status must establish residency and request reinstatement.

== Dual nationality ==
Dual nationality is not allowed in Guinea for persons who obtained Guinean nationality at birth.

== History ==
=== African empires and European contact (1443–1882) ===
The Casa da Guiné was founded in 1443 in Lisbon as a private venture, licensed by Prince Henry the Navigator to explore the potential of Christianization and commerce in West Africa. Their goal was to establish permanent relationships with the African kingdoms in an effort to work together in trading ventures. The fort they founded that year on Arguin Island allowed the access the coast from the Bay of Arguin to the Gulf of Guinea. Between 1474 and 1495, the Portuguese began interacting with the peoples in the Fouta Djallon, specifically the invading Fula people. By the end of the fifteenth century, the region had been conquered by the Mali Empire, also known as the Manden Empire. Though ruled by a high emperor, local chiefs had autonomy over the inhabitants in their territories. The village formed the nucleus of society with the chief extending protection to his kin in exchange for their loyalty. In a succession of conquests, the Songhai Empire required tributes from the local population from 1494. The Songhai attacked the capital of the Mali Empire in 1546, but they were displaced by the invading Saadi Sultanate in 1590. The influx of Islam into the region also brought migrants from the Sahel, Mandinka and Soninke people, into Upper Guinea, where they founded the Batè Empire on the banks of the Milo River at Kankan. The Saadi ruled to 1670 and then the Bambara Empire of Ségou became dominate, after conquering the last remnants of the Mali Empire. These various states interacted with and competed with each other to control commerce in the region.

Increasingly Europeans involved in the Transatlantic Slave Trade disrupted the traditional economic ties of Africa and the Mediterranean Muslim networks of trade, replacing them with reliance on European markets. Conflict became frequent both within and between states in their quest to capitalize on selling captives to Europeans, leading to destabilization of the region. In the early eighteenth century, the Batè Empire aligned with the emerging Imamate of Futa Jallon. The Imamate was founded in 1727 during the Fula jihads when the Islamicized Fula pastoralists and merchants conquered the Yalunka people, who had settled in Middle Guinea around Gaoual and Télimélé. They established an Islamic federation of nine provinces governed by Sharia law, with a central capital at Timbo. Abolition of the slave trade, in the first half of the nineteenth century, brought about a new push to establish alliances between Europeans and African states in an attempt to monopolize trade networks. From 1827, the French began attempts to spread their presence south from Senegal. Alternating diplomacy and force, they wrote treaties to gain control of territories and offer protection to chieftainships along the Upper Guinea Coast. The Toucouleur Empire emerged at Dinguiraye in the 1850s with a series of conquests against rulers in Senegambia and the Bambara Empire, taking Ségou in 1861. In the 1870s, the Batè Empire agreed to merge with the Wassoulou Empire, formed after the Toucouleur Empire fell in 1864 to gain protection from regional conflicts. By 1882, the French had control of the territories along the Mellacorée, Nunez, and Pongo Rivers, as well as Tombo Island, establishing trading posts over the area they called the Rivières du Sud (Southern Rivers).

=== French period (1882–1958) ===
The British recognized French sovereignty over the colony of Rivières du Sud in 1882. In 1884, Germany annexed the territory between the Bramayah River (also known as the Dembia River) and the Dubréka estuary of the Kaloum people. To settle the dispute, France ceded to Germany territory it claimed in Petit Popo and Porto Seguro in 1885 in exchange for the Kaloum's territory and recognition of the French colony. Portugal recognized the French claim in 1886. The colony had been administrated from Senegal, but on 17 December 1891, it became autonomous. The name of the colony was officially changed on 10 March 1893 to French Guinea. In 1895, the French established the administration system that would govern its possessions in French West Africa for the next sixty years. A Governor-General was installed and a headquarters was founded in Dakar, in the Colony of Senegal. The Governor-General's authority was extended to Senegal, French Guinea, and the Ivory Coast colonies, and in 1899 to Dahomey and French Sudan. Under Article 109 of the French Constitution of 1848, French territories were to be governed by specific laws until the constitution was extended there. This provision laid the groundwork for nationality legislation based upon whether the native inhabitants were able to be assimilated by adopting European standards. From 1848, those persons who settled in the colonies and were from France were considered nationals who had full rights and were subject to French law. However, those born in the new territories were considered to be nationals without citizenship. Nationals in the older colonies of the Antilles, Guiana, Réunion and parts of India and Senegal were granted political rights, but those in new colonies were confirmed by a decree on 14 July 1865 to be subjects and not citizens, unless they renounced their allegiance to native custom and possessed sufficient understanding of the obligations of citizenship.

Also in 1848, slavery was abolished throughout the French Empire and the Civil Code was extended to all of the French citizens in the colonies. Under the Civil Code, women were legally incapacitated and paternal authority was established over their children. Upon marriage, a woman married to a French man automatically acquired the same nationality as her spouse. Illegitimate children were barred from inheritance and nationality could only be transmitted through a father. Non-citizen nationals were governed by traditional laws concerning marriage and inheritance which placed the well-being of the community above individual rights. These laws prevented a wife from being treated as a slave, required her husband to support her, and entitled her kin to a bride price, to compensate them for the loss of her fertility to their kinship group and secure the legality of the union. Having paid the price for the marriage contract, she and her offspring belonged to the kinship network of her husband and could be inherited if her husband died.

The French Nationality Law of 1889 codified previous statutory laws, changing the French standard from jus sanguinis to jus soli and was extended to the French West Indies. Under its terms, women who would become stateless by the rule to acquire their spouse's nationality were allowed to retain their French nationality upon marriage. The Nationality Law was modified in 1897 when it was extended to the remainder of the French colonies. Clarification in the 1897 decree included that bestowing nationality by birth in French territory only applied to children born in France, restoring descent requirements for the colonies. Under the Code de l'indigénat (Code of Indigenous Status) promulgated for Algeria in 1881 and extended to French West Africa in 1904, nationals in the new colonies followed customary law. The French West African Federation had been founded that year with the existing five colonies, of Dahomey, Guinea, Ivory Coast, Senegal, and Sudan, and was later expanded to include Mauritania, Niger, and Upper Volta.

On 25 May 1912, a Décret N°. 27892 was issued specifically addressing the status of French West Africans. Under its terms, African subjects could acquire French citizenship if at the age of majority and having proved three years of established domicile in the territory, they were able to read and write French; they were of good character and assimilated to French culture, or they engaged in a public or private French enterprise for a minimum or ten years; and they had sufficient means of self-support. The language requirement could be waived for those who had received military medals or recognition of the Legion of Honor or were in the French civil service. Upon application, subjects were required to acknowledge that they gave up their personal status under customary law and were to be governed by French laws. The decree noted that married women and minor children acquired the status of their husband or father however, this was only the case if the marriage had been conducted under French law, rather than customary practice.

Following the end of World War I France passed a law, "Décret N°. 24 on 25 March 1915 that allowed subjects or protected persons who were non-citizen nationals and had established domicile in a French territory to acquire full citizenship, including the naturalization of their wives and minor children, by having received the cross of the Legion of Honor, having obtained a university degree, having rendered service to the nation, having attained the rank of an officer or received a medal from the French army, who had married a Frenchwoman and established a one year residency; or who had resided for more than ten years in a colony other than their country of origin. A 1918 decree written for French West Africa was aimed at decorated veterans of the war and their families, providing they had not previously been denied their rights nor participated in actions against French rule. Even with these laws, only eleven Dahomean men naturalized with full French citizenship between 1920 and 1930.

In 1927, France passed a new Nationality Law, which under Article 8, removed the requirement for married women to automatically derive the nationality of a husband and provided that her nationality could only be changed if she consented to change her nationality. It also allowed children born in France to native-born French women married to foreigners to acquire their nationality from their mothers. When it was implemented it included Guadeloupe, Martinique and Réunion but was extended to the remaining French possessions for French citizens only in 1928. Under Article 26 of the 1928 decree was the stipulation that it did not apply to natives of the French possessions except Algeria, Guadeloupe, Martinique, and Réunion. A decade later, the legal incapacity of married women was finally invalidated for French citizens. In 1939, France determined that marriage and inheritance were too significant to continue being dealt with in native courts. That year, the Mandel Decree was enacted in French West Africa as well as French Equatorial Africa. Under its terms child marriage was discouraged. It established the minimum age at marriage as fourteen for women and sixteen for men, invalidated marriages wherein spouses did not consent, and nullified levirate marriage without approval of the woman.

At the end of World War II, a statute issued on 7 March 1944 granted French citizenship to those who had performed services to the nation, such as serving as civil servants or receiving recognitions. The Constitution of 1946 granted French citizenship to all subjects of France's territories without having to renounce their personal status as natives. In 1945, a new Code of French Nationality was passed, which conferred once again automatic French nationality on foreign wives of French men, but allowed mothers who were French nationals to pass their nationality to children born outside of France. It expressly applied to Algeria, French Guiana, Guadeloupe, Martinique and Réunion and was extended to the Overseas Territories in 1953, but in the case of the latter had distinctions for the rights of those who were naturalized. In 1951 the Jacquinot Decree strengthened the provisions in French West and Equatorial Africa of the Mandel decree removing women who were twenty-one years old, or divorced, from control by a father or guardian and establishing specific rules for the payment and determining the amount of a bride price.

The legal framework of Guinea was changed by the Loi-cadre Defferre issued on 23 June 1956, which granted internal self-governance to French territories and expanded their Territorial Assemblies. These changes led to an increase in political activity and a press for the dissolution of the Federation of French West Africa. During negotiations for the new French Constitution of 1958, a referendum was held in Guinea in September, wherein the inhabitants voted not to form a commonwealth under France, but instead to gain their independence. It was the only French colony to reject continued union with France at the time. Charles de Gaulle was punitive in his response, cutting off financial aid and protection to the country. The French government immediately repatriated all officials and records, and terminated investment into the country. Because of the withdrawal, and because the French constitution spoke only of the rights of French citizens, Guinea's rejection of joining the French Community created a crisis, as there was no nationality law in place that described who belonged to the country other than in a French connotation. (Note: With the passage of the 1958 French Constitution, nationality provisions were standardized for France, Overseas Departments, and Overseas Territories. Article 86 excluded the possibility for independence of the colonies. The French Constitution was amended in 1960 to allow states to maintain membership in the Community even if they were independent republics.) The French government maintained that an official transition of power was required for them to recognize the new nation, but within two months, the majority of other United Nations members had recognized Guinea's independence.

=== Post-independence (1958–present) ===
On 2 October 1958, independence of the Republic of Guinea was declared. A Constitutional Commission was called and hastily drafted the 1958 Constitution within ten days. Because of the short time given to draft the Constitution, French law was copied verbatim, and there were no provisions for who gained nationality at independence. A Nationality Law (Ordonnance No.011, 1 March 1960) was not adopted until 1960, but it basically followed the French model. Under its terms children who were legitimate automatically derived the nationality of their father. Children who were illegitimate, whose father was unknown, or stateless, could acquire the nationality of their mother. A woman who married a Guinean national acquired his nationality automatically upon celebration of the marriage, unless she specifically chose to decline it and would not become stateless. A Guinean woman marrying a foreigner was not denaturalized by marriage, but could take her husband's nationality if she declared that she wanted to do that prior to the marriage ceremony. If a wife had previously lost her nationality because of marriage she could regain it by establishing a residence in Guinea, proving that she previously had Guinean status, and naturalizing.

Under pressure from women's and human rights organizations, Guinea passed a new Constitution in 1982. In 1983, the Nationality Law (Loi 004/APN/83, 16 February 1983) was revised, allowing children born in the territory, regardless of parentage to acquire Guinean nationality upon reaching their majority. It also established a principal of double jus soli, meaning if the child and the parent were both born in Guinea, the child was automatically Guinean, regardless of the parent's original nationality. However, it retained provisions that did not allow women and men to equally acquire nationality, pass on their nationality to their children, register the births of their children, or acquire identity cards. Children could repudiate nationality acquired through their mother and acquisition of nationality maternally required an administrative process. While the wife of a Guinean national automatically obtained her husband's nationality upon marriage the husband of a Guinean national could only naturalize after a two-year residency. In 1990, after the collapse of the Soviet Union, protests emerged in Guinea with demands for democracy and implementation of the rule of law. A new Constitution was adopted on 23 December 1990, after the first plebiscite ever held over a constitution in Guinea and a later constitution was adopted in 2010, which provided only that nationality was to be defined by separate statute. The 1983 Nationality Law remained in place until it was repealed by the new nationality provisions contained in the 2019 Civil Code of Guinea. On 4 July 2019, a new Civil Code (Loi L/2019/0035/AN) replaced the previous nationality legislation in Articles 50 to 179, simplifying and equalizing the means to acquire nationality. A controversial provision of the updated code was that it allowed for legality of polygamy. In 2020, a new constitution was enacted, but it was suspended in September 2021, after a coup d'état.
