= Kouroukoro =

Town in Guinea

Coordinates: 10°39′N 09°53′W

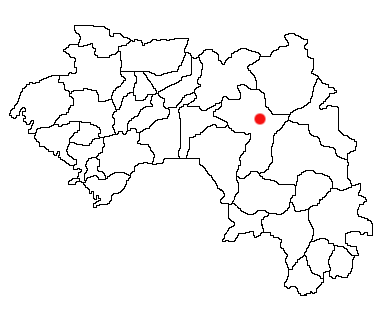
Location of Kouroukoro on a map of Guinea

Kouroukoro is a Sub-Prefecture located in northwestern Guinea, under the administrative control of Prefecture of Kouroussa. It has an estimated population of 5000 to 7500 inhabitants. The town and surrounding area is a center of Malinke culture. Kouroukoro was a district in upper Guinea, Republic of Guinea. From early 2021 Kouroukoro was upgraded by the government to the rank of Sub-Prefecture i.e. it now has other districts that are under it politically. They are Districts of Niemen, Saramadia, Kankaya and of course Kouroukoro. It is part of the Kouroussa Prefecture. Kouroukoro lies about 500 km from the capital Conakry, about 50 km from the prefecture of Dabola and about 95 km from the prefecture of Kouroussa

== History ==
People that make up the present day Kouroukoro are descended from people that migrated from Dabola, the Dabos and the Beretes. Kouroukoro represented part of the southern end of the Manden: the Mandé heartland of the Mali Empire. Much of the Djallonke population of the area migrated from the west when the Fula people conquered the Fouta Djallon in the 13th - 16th centuries. With the collapse of the empire, southern Manden confederations and states continued to exist, including in the area around Toumania a neighbor of Kouroukoro. In the 17th century the Fama Da Monzon Diarra of the Bambara Empire made Kouroussa of which Kouroukoro is a part of his state's southern reach.

== Colonialism ==
By the arrival of Europeans, Kouroukoro was a minor trade stop between the Niger River valley and the coast, with the so-called "Leprince" overland route running from the coast via Kindia, Timbo, and Kouroussa all the way to Kankan and to the forest region. In the late 19th century French forces appeared in the region just to the north, establishing bases at Kayes, Kita, Mali, Bafoulabé and eventually at Bamako. Countering the French expansion was the Fula Jihad state of which exploded out of neighboring Dinguiray to conquer both the Mandé states surrounding Kouroussa to the northwest and the Bambara to the northeast. To the south, another Mande conquest state of Samory Toure appeared, sending his well-armed forces against Kouroussa, its neighbors, and the French alike, while the Fouta Djallon state raided the area periodically. The French officer Aimé Olivier, attempting to convince the Timbo Almamate to sign a protectorate, passed through Kouroussa in the 1880s, and at the beginning of the 1890s, French military under Louis Archinard established garrison posts at Kankan and Kouroussa, commanded from a larger post just downstream at Siguiri. In 1893–1894, Commandant Briquelot set up a post at Kouroussa, as it lay along the main line for French fighting with the forces of Samory to the south. From here French forces raided areas controlled by Samory, even launching raids from here into the British territory of Sierra Leone. By 1895, even while fighting with Samory continued, the French had set up a school to train local workers to identify, collect, and prepare wild rubber for French industrial purposes. Kouroussa became a regional center of rubber requisitions (often instituted as a tax in labour), which peaked in the 1910s. Kouroussa was administered as part of the Siguiri Cercle, which also included Kankan.

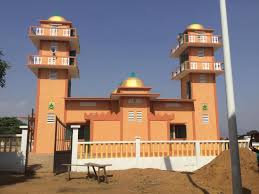

== Contemporary history ==
Kouroukoro has undergone quite a bit of development since the fire inferno that engulfed much of the district in the middle 1990s. The town has got a hospital, a police station, a few schools and a market.

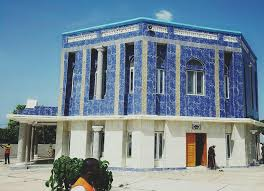
Mosque kouroukoro berete

== Geography ==
Upper Guinea or la Haute-Guinée of which Kouroukoro is a large plain covering eastern Guinea, Sierra Leone, Liberia and extending into north western Côte d'Ivoire. Mostly forming the upper watershed of the River Niger, it is not heavily populated and is home to the Haut Niger National Park. Kouroukoro is surrounded by a mountain that dominate the scene, mountain gorillas are still found on the mountain range.

== Climate ==
The climate of Kouroukoro is the same as that of the other savannah region, it gets rainfall lightly that is conducive for groundnut and rice plantation. The season is divided into two: the rainy and the dry season. The rains start from late May to early November and the rest of the year is the dry season. Population and demographics With an estimated population of a few thousands, Kouroussa functions more as an agricultural and transport center for the surrounding agricultural region. The people are mainly from the Malinke (va. Mandingo) ethnic group and they practice Islam which is the predominant religion in the whole country. As a result, polygamy is widely accepted, the population consist of a large part of people under the age of 25 years.

== Economy Transport ==
With its position which lies in the middle of Dabola and Kouroussa, about 50 km from Dabola and about 100 km from Kouroussa, Kouroukoro is an important center of transport and trade. The town also lies at a junction in Guinea's N1 highway, which is a major transport route between Conakry, Kankan, and (via the N7 and N32) neighboring Mali.

== Agriculture ==
The Savanna climate in the region around Kouroukoro support a wide range of subsistence and cash crop farming, producing rice, groundnuts, onions and millet for sale, as well as supporting cotton farming and cattle ranching by both locals and semi-nomadic Fula people whose largest local center is in the nearby Fouta Djallon highlands.

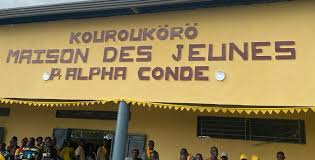
Youth center kouroukoro

== Education ==
Kouroukoro has got a few schools. The first school was established in 1958, since then they have constructed a Franco-Arab school and two other schools that focus mainly on the French language curriculum. The education in Kouroukoro consist of primary school all the way to secondary school level. After that one will have to go one of the major towns in Guinea to pursue a university education.
