= Kouroussa Prefecture =

Coordinates: 10°39′10″N 9°53′06″W

- Prefecture
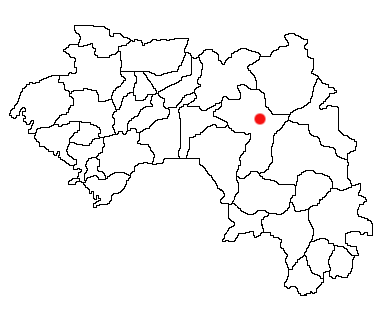
- Location of Kouroussa Prefecture and seat in Guinea.
- Country: Guinea
- Region: Kankan Region
- Capital: Kouroussa

Area
  - Total: 14,050 km^{2} (5,420 sq mi)

Population (2014 census)
  - Total: 268,630
  - Density: 19.12/km^{2} (49.52/sq mi)
- Time zone: UTC+0 (Guinea Standard Time)

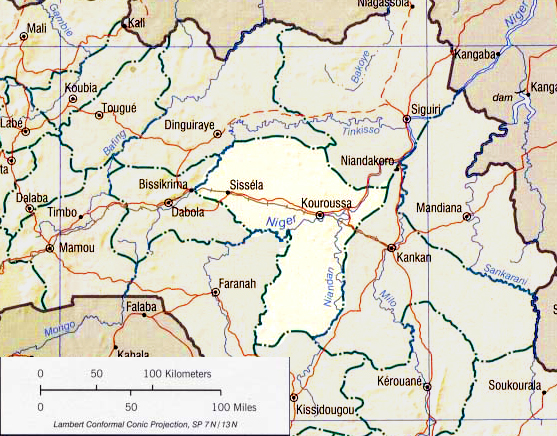
Kouroussa Prefecture (highlighted) and surrounding region.

Kouroussa is a prefecture located in the Kankan Region of Guinea. The capital is Kouroussa. The prefecture covers an area of 14,050 km.² and has a population of 268,630. With Kouroussa town by far the largest in the Prefecture numbering only 10,000, the vast majority of the Prefecture's population live in small rural communities, making their living from subsistence and small scale cash crop agriculture, as well as small scale trade and mining. The majority of the population are members of the Malinke ethnic group or related Mande speakers. The eastern portion of the prefecture is formed from the Niger River valley, while most of the area characterized by low rolling hills and dry savanna grasslands or scrub-like forest.

== Culture ==
The majority of the prefecture's population comes from the Malinke and Djallonke ethnic groups, who speak related Mande languages and follow the Muslim religion. The Kouroussa area is the centre of the Hamana-Malinke Mande sub-group -- "Hamana" being the historic name for the region, while the Malinke are the major Mande speaking ethnic group of the upper Niger valley. There are also sizable minority communities of Fula and Dyula, the latter traditionally forming trade communities in towns like Kouroussa.

The writer and intellectual Camara Laye (1928–80) grew up in Kouroussa town, and his memoir, The Black Child, is in part about his youth in the town.

Kouroussa and surrounding towns maintain the pre-colonial Mande ceremonial kingship of Hamana, with the most recent holder of the office King of Kouroussa King Sayon Keita I.

== Traditional music ==
Hamana-Malinke are especially known for their unique musical traditions, especially their polyphonic Djembé drumming traditions, with a number of well known drum masters—including Famoudou Konate, Daouda Kourouma, and Sékou Konaté—coming from the town. Djembé groups in Kouroussa are known for the inclusion of the bass dununba drum and the long kenken bell.

== Economy ==
=== Transport ===
With its position near the upstream limit of navigation on the Niger River, Kouroussa town is an important center of transport and trade. The Guinea Railway crosses the Niger River at this town, where there is also a river port. The town also lies at a junction in Guinea's N1 highway, which is a major transport route between Conakry, Kankan, and (via the N7 and N32) neighboring Mali. The Niger – Conakry rail line runs 588 km to the capital of Guinea, with a branch of 74 kilometers running from Kouroussa to Kankan. It was built by the French, using African labor, in the first two decades of the 20th century.

=== Agriculture ===
The Savanna climate in the prefecture support a wide range of subsistence and cash crop farming, producing rice, groundnuts, onions and millet for sale, as well as supporting larger scale cotton farming and cattle ranching by both locals and semi-nomadic Fula people whose largest local center is in the nearby Fouta Djallon highlands.

=== Mining ===
Major mining companies are engaged in ongoing exploration drilling in a series of government granted Gold mining concessions near the town. The Kouroussa area also has a long history as a center of small scale gold mining, which continues in so called "Artisanal Mining" Recent criticism has surfaced around the working conditions, pay, and the widespread use of child labour in these small gold mines, and the method which middlemen, many based in Kouroussa, purchase and transport gold. Gold collected in Kouroussa is sold on—with almost no regulation or oversight—to larger merchant houses in Bamako, Conakry, and eventually to smelters in Europe. Large scale Titanium mining has also been proposed in the Kouroussa area, with both Dredging of Heavy Mineral Sands from rivers and streams and dry pit mines proposed as of 2007.

== Sub-prefectures ==
The prefecture is divided administratively into sub-prefectures:

1. Kouroussa-Centre
2. Babila
3. Balato
4. Banfélé
5. Baro
6. Cisséla
7. Douako
8. Doura
9. Kiniéro
10. Komola-Koura
11. Koumana
12. Sanguiana
13. Kouroukoro
