= Bohodou =

- Location in Guinea
- Coordinates: 9°45′N 9°4′W
- Country: Guinea
- Region: Kankan Region

Bohodou is a town in the Kankan Region of Guinea.

Uranium mining has yet to take place in Guinea but is currently being explored as a natural resource.
