= Douako =

- Sub-prefecture and town
- Location in Guinea
- Coordinates: 9°44′N 10°11′W
- Country: Guinea
- Region: Kankan Region
- Prefecture: Kouroussa Prefecture

Area
  - Total: 1,109 sq mi (2,872 km^{2})

Population (2014)
  - Total: 23,416
- Time zone: UTC+0 (GMT)

Douako is a town and sub-prefecture in the Kouroussa Prefecture in the Kankan Region of eastern-central Guinea. As of 2014 it had a population of 23,416 people.

As of 2014, the population has slightly more females than males, with around 53.3% of its population being female. The town also has a slightly more young population, with 51.5% being 0–14 years old. Urbanization is almost non existent, with 100% of the town being rural.
