= Komola-Koura =

- Sub-prefecture and town
- Location in Guinea
- Coordinates: 11°03′N 10°25′W
- Country: Guinea
- Region: Kankan Region
- Prefecture: Kouroussa Prefecture

Population (2014)
  - Total: 13,941
- Time zone: UTC+0 (GMT)

Komola-Koura is a town and sub-prefecture in the Kouroussa Prefecture in the Kankan Region of eastern-central Guinea. As of 2014 it had a population of 13,941 people.
