= Doura, Guinea =

Doura
- Sub-prefecture and town
- Location in Guinea
- Coordinates: 12°01′N 9°00′W
- Country: Guinea
- Region: Kankan Region
- Prefecture: Kouroussa Prefecture

Population (2014)
  - Total: 18,675
- Time zone: UTC+0 (GMT)

Doura is a town and sub-prefecture in the Kouroussa Prefecture in the Kankan Region of eastern-central Guinea, near the border of Mali. As of 2014 it had a population of 18,675 people.
