= Boula, Guinea =

Boula
- Sub-prefecture and town
- Location in Guinea
- Coordinates: 9°59′N 8°25′W
- Country: Guinea
- Region: Kankan Region
- Prefecture: Kankan Prefecture

Population (2014)
  - Total: 15,763
- Time zone: UTC+0 (GMT)

Boula is a town and sub-prefecture in the Kankan Prefecture in the Kankan Region of eastern Guinea, near the borders of Mali and Ivory Coast. As of 2014 it had a population of 15,763 people.
