= Moribayah =

- Sub-prefecture and town
- Location in Guinea
- Coordinates: 9°53′N 9°33′W
- Country: Guinea
- Region: Kankan Region
- Prefecture: Kankan Prefecture

Population (2014)
  - Total: 14,141
- Time zone: UTC+0 (GMT)

Moribayah is a town and sub-prefecture in the Kankan Prefecture in the Kankan Region of eastern Guinea. As of 2014 it had a population of 14,141 people.
