= Balandougouba, Mandiana =

Balandougouba
- Sub-prefecture and town
- Location in Guinea
- Coordinates: 11°19′N 8°25′W
- Country: Guinea
- Region: Kankan Region
- Prefecture: Mandiana Prefecture

Population (2014)
  - Total: 28,597
- Time zone: UTC+0 (GMT)

Balandougouba is a town and sub-prefecture in the Mandiana Prefecture in the Kankan Region of eastern Guinea. As of 2014 it had a population of 28,597 people.
