= Morodou =

- Sub-prefecture and town
- Location in Guinea
- Coordinates: 10°51′N 8°40′W
- Country: Guinea
- Region: Kankan Region
- Prefecture: Mandiana Prefecture

Population (2014)
  - Total: 28,140
- Time zone: UTC+0 (GMT)

Morodou is a town and sub-prefecture in the Mandiana Prefecture in the Kankan Region of eastern Guinea. As of 2014 it had a population of 28,140 people.
