= Gbérédou-Baranama =

- Sub-prefecture and town
- Location in Guinea
- Coordinates: 10°29′N 9°35′W
- Country: Guinea
- Region: Kankan Region
- Prefecture: Kankan Prefecture

Population (2014)
  - Total: 17,448
- Time zone: UTC+0 (GMT)

Gbérédou-Baranama is a sub-prefecture in the Kankan Prefecture in the Kankan Region of eastern Guinea. As of 2014 it has a population of 17,448 people.
