= Guinean passport =

Passport issued to citizens of Guinea

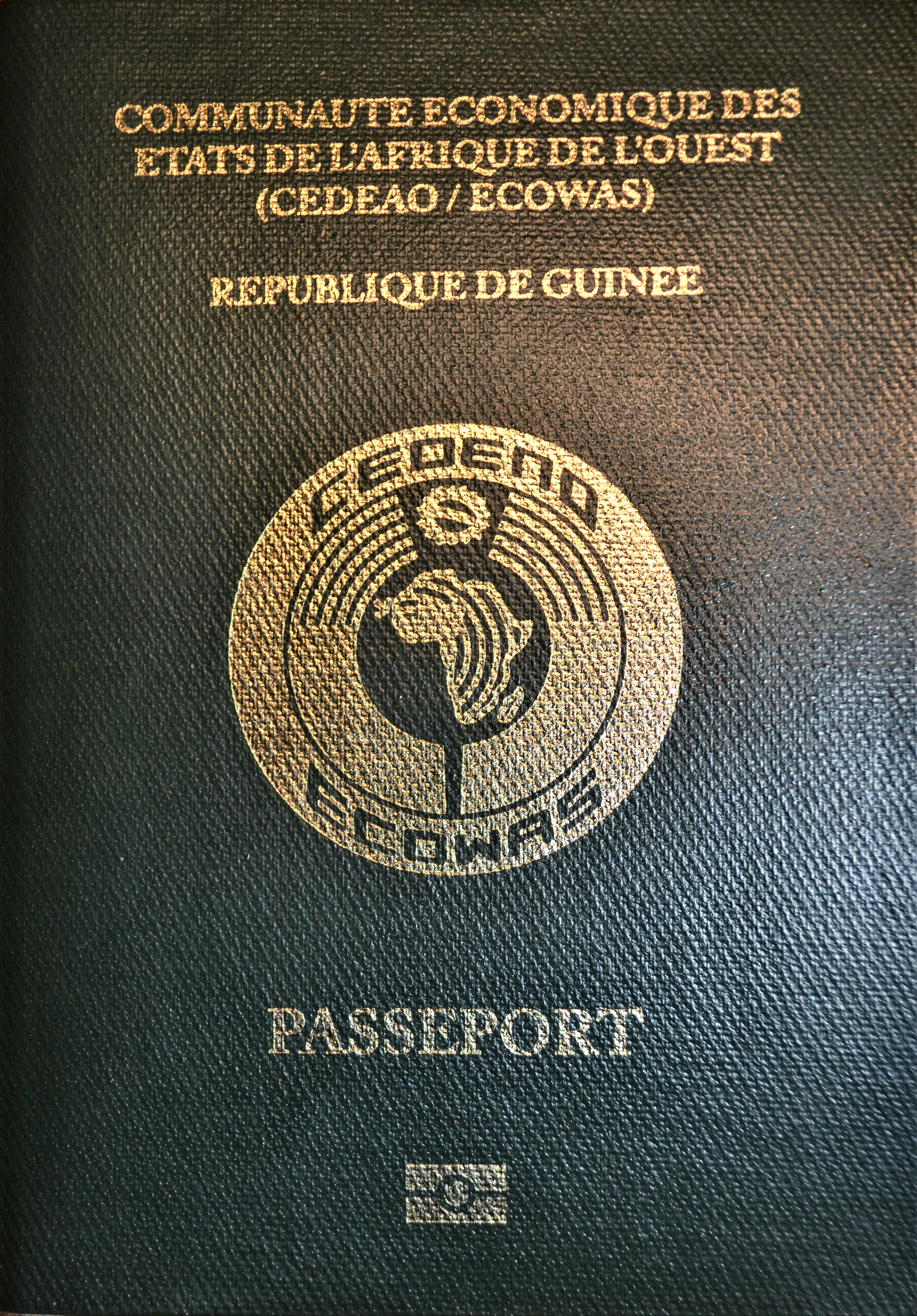
- Front cover of the current Guinean passport (with chip)
- Type: Passport
- Issued by: Guinea
- First issued: 14 May 2014 (biometric passport)
- Purpose: Identification
- Eligibility: Guinean citizenship
- Expiration: 5 years

The Guinean passport is issued to citizens of the Guinea for international travel.

== Languages ==
The data page/information page is printed in French and English.

== See also ==
- List of passports
- Visa requirements for Guinean citizens
