= Babila =

- Sub-prefecture and town
- Location in Guinea
- Coordinates: 10°39′N 9°41′W
- Country: Guinea
- Region: Kankan Region
- Prefecture: Kouroussa Prefecture

Population (2014)
  - Total: 16,290
- Time zone: UTC+0 (GMT)

Babila is a town and sub-prefecture in the Kouroussa Prefecture in the Kankan Region of eastern-central Guinea. As of 2014, it had a population of 16,290 people.
