= Banfélé =

- Sub-prefecture and town
- Location in Guinea
- Coordinates: 10°13′N 10°03′W
- Country: Guinea
- Region: Kankan Region
- Prefecture: Kouroussa Prefecture

Population (2014)
  - Total: 24,555
- Time zone: UTC+0 (GMT)

Banfélé is a town and sub-prefecture in the Kouroussa Prefecture in the Kankan Region of eastern-central Guinea. As of 2014 it had a population of 24,555 people.
