= Mamouroudou =

- Sub-prefecture
- Location in Guinea
- Coordinates: 9°24′N 9°21′W
- Country: Guinea
- Region: Kankan Region
- Prefecture: Kankan Prefecture

Population (2014)
  - Total: 14,609
- Time zone: UTC+0 (GMT)

Mamouroudou is a sub-prefecture in the Kankan Prefecture in the Kankan Region of eastern Guinea. As of 2014 it had a population of 14,609 people.
