= Kouroussa =

- Sub-prefecture and town
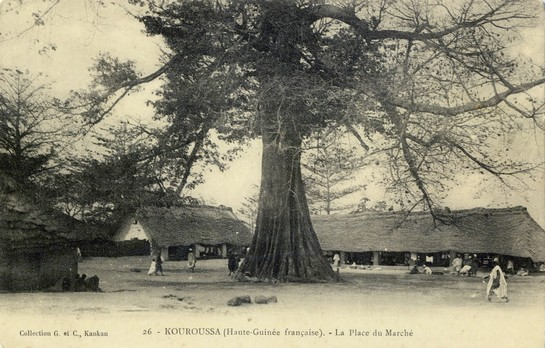
- Kouroussa market square, seen in a French image from 1911

- Location in Guinea
- Coordinates: 10°39′00″N 09°53′00″W
- Country: Guinea
- Region: Kankan Region
- Prefecture: Kouroussa Prefecture
- Elevation: 362 m (1,188 ft)

Population (2014)
  - Total: 39,611
- Time zone: UTC0

Kouroussa or Kurussa (N’ko: ߞߙߎ߬ߛߊ߫) is a town located in northeastern Guinea, and is the capital of Kouroussa Prefecture. As of 2014 it had a population of 39,611 people. A trade center and river port from at least the time of the Mali Empire, Kouroussa has long relied upon its position near the upstream limit of navigation of the Niger River to make it an important crossroads for people and goods moving between the Guinea coast and the states of the western Soudan and Niger River valley. The town and surrounding area is a center of Malinke culture, and is known for its Djembe drumming tradition.

== Etymology ==
Kourousa was named after a river in the city from the direction of Kankan in the highway. The river was named after a river (Kouroussa (lén)) in Kita], which was the immigrant city of their ancestors. Before they reached the place where the city was established, they saw this river and named it after this river in Kita as well as to not forget their history.

== History ==
=== Early history ===
Kourousa was founded by the Keitas from Balato which was their first village after their immigrant town, Kita. Around 1470s, they immigrated from there to inherit Dankaran Touma in Kissidougou, thought that it's situated in the upper Niger River. After their father's (Morabama and Moridema) death, they found many villages to the river's left and right shores, and formed a traditional state named "Hamana" (Amana), in which Kourousa was the capital city.

Kouroussa is one of the oldest and historical cities among those established in guinea area. Since Naré Megan's period, there were many villages established in actual Kouroussa areas, such as Camara's former little state of "Balia" (Sanasiya & Sankiana and around); he married a wife named "Maninba Camara" commonly known as "Namandjé" who bore his latest son "Mandén-Mori", who's became the lord of Mandingos hunter.

During his conquest of Manding, Samori Touré sent his brother "Gbénkan-Tchömö" to conquer Hamana. During this period the ruler of Hamana was named as Karanton Keita, and sent troops to stop this invention. Karonkan's troops defeated Tchömo's troops in "Balan", killed him and enslaved most of his sol, and the battle was named as "battle of Balan Woulouba".

The next year, Touré organised and attacked the other Kouroussa's areas and a peace treaty was signed in Doura. Which made Karanton as the last ruler of the state.

During his return under French colonial troops, Sámori organised and encouraged Mansa (king) "Soriba" of Ballia (probably Sanasiya) and "Aguibou of Dinguiraye to fight against the French. But the French prepare the troops from kouroussa to conquer Balia and negotiate Aguibou Tall to leave dinguiraye and rule the former Ségu empire.

Kouroussa represented the southern end of the Manden: the Mandé heartland of the Mali Empire. Kouroussa's position as a river port has made it a historic center for regional trade, much like its larger neighbor Kankan. Much of the Jallonke population of the area migrated from the west when the Fula people conquered the Fouta Djallon in the 13th - 16th centuries. With the collapse of the empire, southern Manden confederations and states continued to exist, including in the area around Kouroussa. In the 17th century the Fama Da Monzon Diarra of the Bambara Empire made Kouroussa the southern reach of his state. By the 18th century the Fula Muslim Imamate of Futa Jallon led by the Alamay of Timbo provided pressure from the south and west, while the growing Kong state (in modern Côte d'Ivoire) became powerful to the south and east. The Mandé state around Kouroussa, called in some periods Hamana and in others Koumara, continued as an important trade center and small regional power, squeezed between these forces.

=== Colonialism ===
The first known European visitor to the town was the French explorer René Caillié, who passed through the area in June 1827 on his journey to Djenné and Timbuktu. In his book Travels through Central Africa to Timbuctoo published in 1830, he wrote:

Courouassa [Kouroussa] is a neat village, surrounded by a mud wall, from ten to twelve feet high and from eight to ten inches thick. It contains between four and five hundred inhabitants. ... the inhabitants are called Dhialonkés [Dialonké], and are chiefly idolaters. They do not travel, but occupy themselves peaceably in the cultivation of their little fields, which are fertilised by the inundations of the river.

By the arrival of Europeans, Kouroussa was a major trade stop between the Niger River valley and the coast, with the so-called "Leprince" overland route running from the coast via Kindia, Timbo, and Kouroussa.

In the late 19th century French forces appeared in the region just to the north, establishing bases at Kayes, Kita, Mali, Bafoulabé and eventually at Bamako. Countering the French expansion was the Fula Jihad state of which exploded out of neighboring Dinguiray to conquer both the Mandé states surrounding Kouroussa to the northwest and the Bambara to the northeast. To the south, the Wassoulou conquest state of Samori Ture appeared, sending his well armed forces against Kouroussa, its neighbors, and the French alike, while the Futa Jallon state raided the area periodically. The French officer Aimé Olivier, attempting to convince the Imamate of Futa Jallon to sign a protectorate, passed through Kouroussa in the 1880s, and at the beginning of the 1890s, French military under Louis Archinard established garrison posts at Kankan and Kouroussa, commanded from a larger post just downstream at Siguiri. In 1893–1894, Commandant Briquelot set up a post at Kouroussa, as it lay along the main line for French fighting with the forces of Samori to the south. From here French forces raided areas controlled by Samori, even launching raids from here into the British territory of Sierra Leone. By 1895, even while fighting with Samori continued, the French had set up a school to train local workers to identify, collect, and prepare wild rubber for French industrial purposes. Kouroussa became a regional center of rubber requisitions (often instituted as a tax in labour), which peaked in the second decade of the 20th century. Kouroussa was administered as part of the Siguiri Cercle, which also included Kankan.

The French, after annexing the Futa Jallon in the 1890s, added the region to the colony of French Upper Guinea, later a part of French West Africa, until Guinea's independence in 1959. During the colonial period the town was made a main trans-shipment point for commodities coming from French Sudan (today's Mali) due to the construction of the Guinea-Niger railway, which met the river at Kouroussa in 1910, and from which rainy season ship transport could reach Bamako. As well as a collection center for wild rubber, the French encouraged the collection gold sifted from streams and dug by local small scale mines. The French also attempted to promote local farming of groundnuts and cotton. There remains a monument to René-Auguste Caillié in Kouroussa, erected by the French.

=== Contemporary history ===
In 2001, Kouroussa was one of several places which was particularly hard hit by flooding, and became a center for thousands of internally displaced people from the surrounding area. In 2005, Kouroussa was rocked by major protests against the government, particularly aimed at Kouroussa Prefect Charles Andre Haba who was accused of embezzling local mining revenue. The town was reported at the time to be a center of the opposition Rally of the Guinean People (RPG)

== Population ==
With an estimated population of just over 10,000, Kouroussa functions more as a services and transport center for the surrounding agricultural region than as a metropolitan center in its own right.

=== Culture ===
The majority of the surrounding population comes from the Malinke and Djallonke ethnic groups, who speak related Mande languages and follow the Muslim religion. Kouroussa and the surrounding region is the centre of the Hamana-Malinke Mande sub-group -- "Hamana" being the name for the region, while the Malinke are the major Mande speaking ethnic group of the upper Niger valley. There are also sizable minority communities of Fula and Dyula, the latter traditionally forming trade communities in towns like Kouroussa.

The writer and intellectual Camara Laye (1928–80) grew up in Kouroussa, and his memoir, L'Enfant noir (The Black Child), is in part about his youth in the town.

Kouroussa and surrounding towns maintain the pre-colonial Mande ceremonial kingship of Hamana, with the most recent holder of the office King of Kouroussa King Sayon Keita I.

Kouroussa is about 50 km SW of the Mandingo cultural site Gberedou/Hamana.

=== Traditional music ===
Hamana-Malinke are especially known for their unique musical traditions, especially their polyphonic Djembé drumming traditions, with a number of well known drum masters—including Famoudou Konate, Daouda Kourouma, and Sékou Konaté—coming from the town. Djembé groups in Kouroussa are known for the inclusion of the bass dununba drum and the long kenken bell.

== Economy ==
=== Transport ===
With its position near the upstream limit of navigation on the Niger River, Kouroussa is an important center of transport and trade. The Guinea Railway crosses the Niger River at this town, where there is also a river port. The town also lies at a junction in Guinea's N1 highway, which is a major transport route between Conakry, Kankan, and (via the N7 and N32) neighboring Mali. The metre gauge Niger – Conakry rail line runs 588 km to the capital of Guinea, with a branch of 74 kilometers running from Kouroussa to Kankan. It was built by the French, using African labor, in the first two decades of the 20th century.

=== Agriculture ===
The Savanna climate in the region around Kouroussa support a wide range of subsistence and cash crop farming, producing rice, groundnuts, onions and millet for sale, as well as supporting larger scale cotton farming and cattle ranching by both locals and semi-nomadic Fula people whose largest local center is in the nearby Fouta Djallon highlands.

=== Mining ===
Major mining companies are engaged in ongoing exploration drilling in a series of government granted Gold mining concessions near the town. The Kouroussa area also has a long history as a center of small scale gold mining, which continues in so called "Artisanal Mining" Recent criticism has surfaced around the working conditions, pay, and the widespread use of child labour in these small gold mines, and the method which middlemen, many based in Kouroussa, purchase and transport gold. Gold collected in Kouroussa is sold on—with almost no regulation or oversight—to larger merchant houses in Bamako, Conakry, and eventually to smelters in Europe. Large scale Titanium mining has also been proposed in the Kouroussa area, with both Dredging of Heavy Mineral Sands from rivers and streams and dry pit mines proposed as of 2007.

== Notable people ==
- Camara Laye -writer

== See also ==
- Transport in Guinea
- Railway stations in Guinea
