= Niantania =

Niantania ߢߊ߲߬ߕߊ߬ߣߌ߲߬ߠߊ߬
- Sub-prefecture and town
- Location in Guinea
- Coordinates: 10°58′N 8°20′W
- Country: Guinea
- Region: Kankan Region
- Prefecture: Mandiana Prefecture

Population (2014)
  - Total: 14,884
- Time zone: UTC+0 (GMT)

Niantania (N’ko: ߢߊ߲߬ߕߊ߬ߣߌ߲߬ߠߊ߬) is a town and sub-prefecture in the Mandiana Prefecture in the Kankan Region of eastern Guinea near the border with Mali. As of 2014 it had a population of 14,884 people.
