= Baté Empire =

Pre-colonial state in modern-day Guinea

The Batè Empire (N’ko: ߓߊߕߍ߫ Bátɛ) was a pre-colonial state centred on Kankan in what is today Guinea. Founded by Mandinka and Soninke people as an Islamic merchant state in the 16th century, it survived until the late 19th century when it was conquered first by Samori Ture and then incorporated into French Guinea.

== History ==
=== Founding ===
Batè (meaning 'by the river') was founded on the left bank of the Milo River in Upper Guinea by members of the Soninké clans Fofana, Kakoro, Kaba and Cissé, who were immigrating from Jafunun and Kaarta. They settled initially in Bakonkokodo and Diankana (f. 1620), in which they received other people and gradually expanded to other areas until it was developed and became a state.

The Kaba clan was initially hosted by the Kakoro's in Diankana, founding their first village nearby named Kojan but abandoning it in 1660. Two years later Fodemoudou Kaba tried again, establishing the village of Kabalaba. In 1680 his sons each founded their own villages (Bate nafadji, Soumankoi, Bankalan and Karifamoudouya). The last, founded by Daouda Kaba, was Fadou, which would later become Kankan, the capital of Batè.

The Fofana of Bakonkokodo also hosted the Béreté's of Kofilanen, Cissé's of Bakonko–cisséla, Diane's of Soila, and Kaba's of Tasliman. They also gosted the other cities in neighbouring tribal states: Djolibakodo, Fodekareah, Tiniedo, Dalaba and Kagan.

The inhabitants of Bate were known for their piety. Rather than a monarchy, they formed a theocratic form of government and cultural form, keeping a small standing army to protect the town from the slave traders. They valued teaching the children the Quran, among other cultural activities. They often built little fortresses in some parts of the town.

=== 18th Century ===
In the first half of the eighteenth century, Batè leaders aligned with their Fula coreligionists in the Imamate of Futa Jallon, a rising military power to their west. In 1763 the warlord Bourama Diakite from Wassoulou drove the inhabitants of the Bate region into Fouta Jalon, where they took refuge in Timbo and Fougoumba for seven years. Upon their return in 1770 they rebuilt and fortified the capital and renamed it Kankan, meaning 'protected city'.

Another later invasion from Wassoulou, led by the kings Diédi and Djiba (or DJI), attempted to conquer Kankan but it was defeated by Alpha-Mamoudou Kaba..

=== Samori Ture and the French ===
In the 1870s Bate agreed to join Samori Ture's Wassoulou Empire. When Bate refused to help him subjugate another Muslim state, however, he attacked and captured Kankan. After having driven out the ruling Kaba dynasty, Samori installed a puppet ruler. The French defeated him and captured Kankan in 1891, at which point the dynasty was restored as puppets of the French.
