= Cisséla =

- Location in Guinea
- Coordinates: 10°50′19″N 10°38′5″W
- Country: Guinea
- Region: Kankan Region

Population (2014)
  - Total: 41,562

Cisséla (or Sissélà) is a town and sub-prefecture in the Kouroussa Prefecture, Kankan Region, of eastern-central Guinea. As of 2014 it had a population of 41,562 people.

== Transport ==
It has a railway station on the main line of Guinean Railways.
