= Sansando =

- Sub-prefecture and town
- Location in Guinea
- Coordinates: 11°05′N 9°12′W
- Country: Guinea
- Region: Kankan Region
- Prefecture: Mandiana Prefecture

Population (2014)
  - Total: 23,018
- Time zone: UTC+0 (GMT)

Sansando is a town and sub-prefecture in the Mandiana Prefecture in the Kankan Region of eastern Guinea. As of 2014 it had a population of 23,018 people.

Sansando, located in the Kafo of Juma was historically an important center for the education of griots.
