= Bankon =

- Sub-prefecture and town
- Location in Guinea
- Coordinates: 11°34′N 8°48′W
- Country: Guinea
- Region: Kankan Region
- Prefecture: Siguiri Prefecture
- Time zone: UTC+0 (GMT)

Bankon is a town and sub-prefecture in the Siguiri Prefecture in the Kankan Region of northern Guinea near the border with Mali.
