= Bate-Nafadji =

- Sub-prefecture and town
- Location in Guinea
- Coordinates: 10°40′N 9°16′W
- Country: Guinea
- Region: Kankan Region
- Prefecture: Kankan Prefecture

Population (2014)
  - Total: 47,611
- Time zone: UTC+0 (GMT)

Bate-Nafadji is a town and sub-prefecture in the Kankan Prefecture in the Kankan Region of eastern Guinea. As of 2014 it had a population of 47,611 people.
