= Mandiana Prefecture =

Coordinates: 10°38′02″N 8°42′04″W

- Prefecture
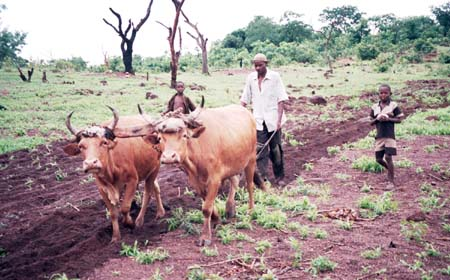

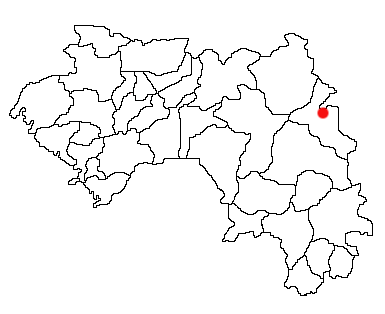
- Location of Mandiana Prefecture and seat in Guinea.
- Country: Guinea
- Region: Kankan Region
- Capital: Mandiana

Area
  - Total: 12,825 km^{2} (4,952 sq mi)

Population (2014 census)
  - Total: 335,999
  - Density: 26.199/km^{2} (67.854/sq mi)
- Time zone: UTC+0 (Guinea Standard Time)

Mandiana is a prefecture located in the Kankan Region of Guinea. The capital is Mandiana. The prefecture covers an area of 12,825 km.² and has a population of 335,999.

== Sub-prefectures ==
The prefecture is divided administratively into 12 sub-prefectures:

1. Mandiana-Centre
2. Balandougouba
3. Dialakoro
4. Faralako
5. Kantoumania
6. Kiniéran
7. Koundian
8. Koundianakoro
9. Morodou
10. Niantania
11. Saladou
12. Sansando

== See also ==
- Fodekaria
