= Kankan Prefecture =

Coordinates: 10°23′05″N 9°18′25″W

- Prefecture
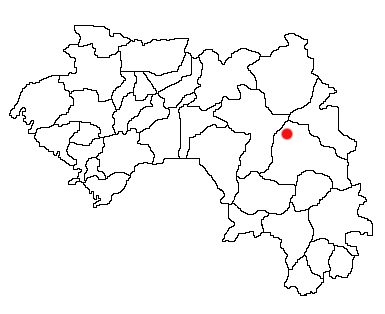
- Location of Kankan Prefecture and seat in Guinea.
- Country: Guinea
- Region: Kankan Region
- Capital: Kankan

Area
  - Total: 19,750 km^{2} (7,630 sq mi)

Population (2025 census)
  - Total: 841,969
  - Density: 42.63/km^{2} (110.4/sq mi)
- Time zone: UTC+0 (Guinea Standard Time)

Kankan is a prefecture located in the Kankan Region of Guinea. The capital is Kankan. The prefecture covers an area of 19,750 km^{2} and had a population of 841,969 at the Census of 1` July 2025.

== Sub-prefectures ==
The prefecture is divided administratively into 13 sub-prefectures:

1. Kankan-Centre
2. Balandougou
3. Bate-Nafadji
4. Boula
5. Gbérédou-Baranama
6. Kanfamoriyah
7. Koumban
8. Mamouroudou
9. Missamana
10. Moribayah
11. Sabadou-Baranama
12. Tinti-Oulen
13. Tokounou
