= Fodekaria =

- Location in Guinea
- Coordinates: 10°49′40″N 9°13′43″W
- Country: Guinea
- Region: Kankan Region

Fodekaria is a town in the Kankan Region of Guinea. Its location is at Latitude: 10° 49' 40.48" and N Longitude: -9° 13' 42.66" W. Being a Muslim majority town, it has been ravaged by the Guinea-Bissau Civil War from 1998 till 1999 AD. The town is notable for having a village chief who is a very conservative Muslim in an otherwise Christian majority region of the nation. Hence, many disagreements have come up with the neighboring villages. This town has also been used as a small base for rebel groups of foreign countries or of rebel groups of Guinea such as: Rally of Democratic Forces of Guinea, RFDG Insurgency,etc.
