= Tinti-Oulen =

- Sub-prefecture and town
- Location in Guinea
- Coordinates: 10°13′00″N 9°12′00″W
- Country: Guinea
- Region: Kankan Region
- Prefecture: Kankan Prefecture

Population (2014)
  - Total: 21,245
- Time zone: UTC+0 (GMT)

Tinti-Oulen is a town and sub-prefecture in the Kankan Prefecture in the Kankan Region of eastern Guinea. As of 2014 it had a population of 21,245 people.
