= Guinea–Mali border =

International border

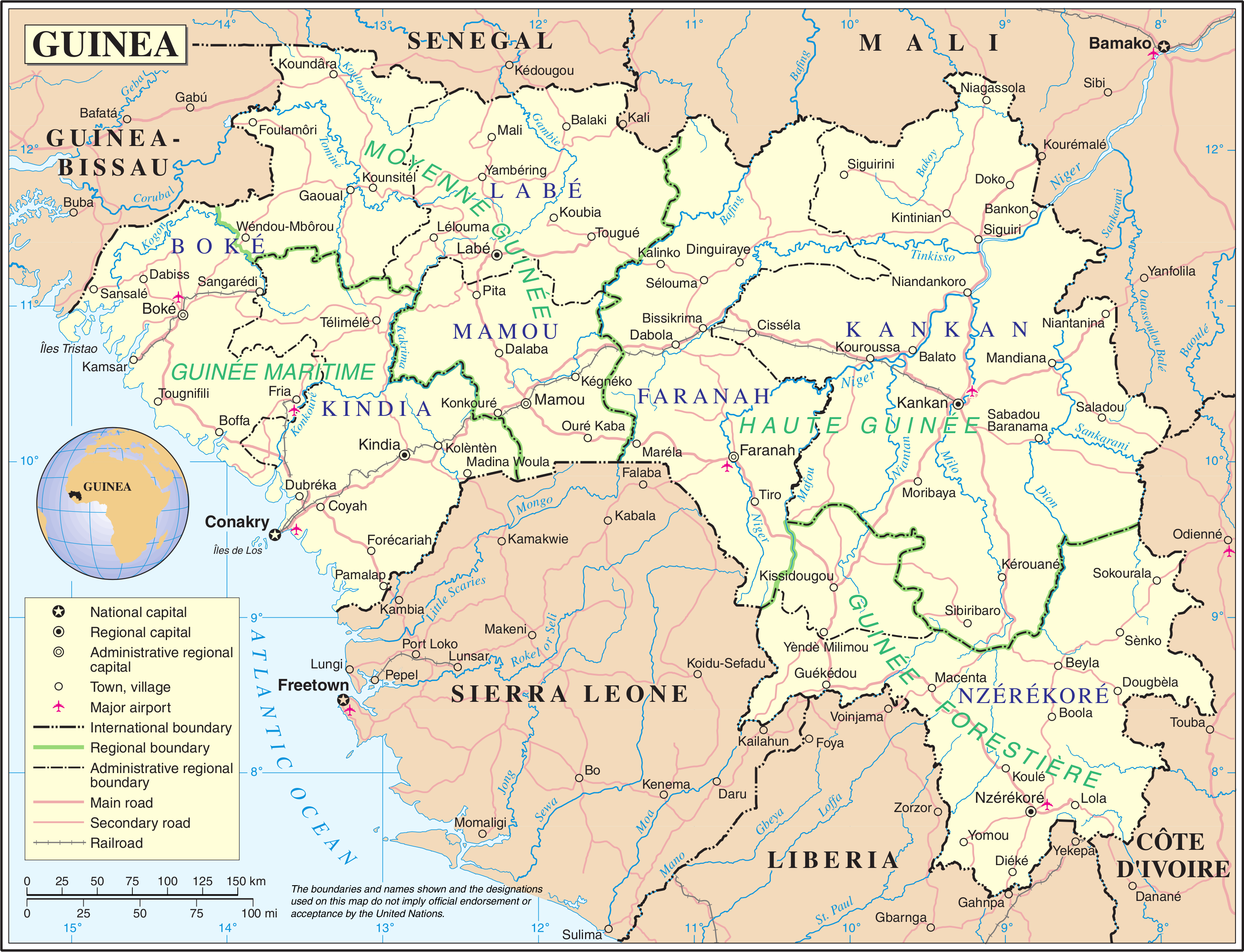
Map of Guinea, with Mali to the north-east

The Guinea–Mali border is 1,062 km (660 mi) in length and runs from the tripoint with Senegal in the north to the tripoint with Ivory Coast in the south.

== Description ==
The border begins in the north at the tripoint with Senegal on the Balinko river, and then follows this river southwards, before turning to the south-east, utilising various rivers and overland sections. The border then reaches the Bafing River, which it follows eastwards, and then the Djinko. The border then goes overland in a southwards direction, with a very brief section utilising the Niger River, before another overland section connects up to the Sankarani River, which it follows for some distance to the south-west. The border then leaves this river, going overland in an eastward and then southward direction via a series of irregular lines, before reaching the tripoint with the Ivory Coast.

== History ==
France had begun settling in the region of modern Senegal in the 17th century, later annexing the coast of what is now Guinea in the late 19th century as the Rivières du Sud colony. The area was renamed French Guinea 1893, and was later included within the French West Africa colony. As a result of the Scramble for Africa in the 1880s France had gained control the upper valley of the Niger River (roughly equivalent to the areas of modern Mali and Niger). France occupied this area in 1900; Mali (then referred to as French Sudan) was originally included, along with modern Niger and Burkina Faso, within the Upper Senegal and Niger colony, however it was later split off and became a constituent of the federal colony of French West Africa (Afrique occidentale française, abbreviated AOF). The precise date the Guinea-Mali boundary was drawn appears to be uncertain, though it is thought to have been drawn at the time of the formal institution of French Guinea in the 1890s; the border was later described in more detail in a French arrete of 1911.

As the movement for decolonisation grew in the post-Second World War era, France gradually granted more political rights and representation for their sub-Saharan African colonies, culminating in the granting of broad internal autonomy to French West Africa and French Equatorial Africa in 1958 within the framework of the French Community. In 1958 Guinea gained independence, followed by Mali in 1960.

In recent years gold mining in the border region has boomed, resulting in several localised clashes along the frontier.

== Settlements near the border ==
=== Guinea ===
- Nouhouya
- Niagassola
- Bankon
- Niantania

=== Mali ===
- Kofoulabe
- Kali
- Kouremale
