= Mandiana =

- Sub-prefecture and town
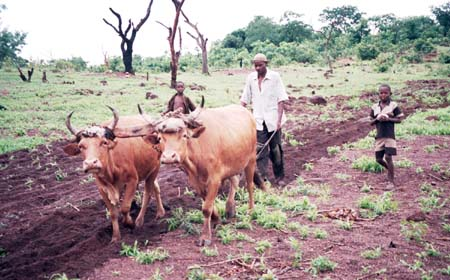

- Location in Guinea
- Coordinates: 10°38′N 8°41′W
- Country: Guinea
- Region: Kankan Region
- Prefecture: Mandiana Prefecture

Government
  - Mayor: Ibrahima Sira Diakité

Population (2014)
  - Total: 25,791

Mandiana is a town located in eastern Guinea. It is the capital of Mandiana Prefecture. As of 2014 the town and surrounding sub-prefecture had a population of 25,791 people.

There are notable gold reserves in the area. It is part of the Birimian rocks, of the Ashanti Gold Belt. It is situated in the Bougouni basin and is underlain by sedimentary rocks of the Upper Birimian Group. The Morila-Syama Gold Belt (known as Morila mine) is located towards the east of the Bougouni basin and is one of the largest gold mines in the area.
