= Baro, Guinea =

Baro
- Sub-prefecture and town
- Location in Guinea
- Coordinates: 10°37′N 9°42′W
- Country: Guinea
- Region: Kankan Region
- Prefecture: Kouroussa Prefecture

Population (2014)
  - Total: 15,578
- Time zone: UTC+0 (GMT)

Baro is a town and sub-prefecture in the Kouroussa Prefecture, Kankan Region, of eastern-central Guinea. As of 2014 it had a population of 15,578 people.

Baro is the ancestral home of the President of Guinea, Alpha Condé. The President's parents were born in Baro. The family later moved to Boke where Alpha Condé was born. The grande celebration of traditional festival called Fête de la Mare: Marsh Festival (Dahlamon in Mandinka) is held in Baro every year on the eve of the first rain. The festival attracts thousands of visitors each year.

Two documentaries by Thomas Roebers and Floris Leeuwenberg show life in Baro. FOLI (there is no movement without rhythm) shows the importance of rhythm (foli) in everyday life and shows dancing. Kasa! shows ritual related to farming.
