= Visa policy of Guinea =

Policy on permits required to enter Guinea

Visitors to Guinea must obtain an eVisa unless they come from one of the countries or territories that are visa exempt. Alternatively visas can be obtained from a Guinean diplomatic mission.

== Visa policy map ==
Guinea Visa exempt Visa on arrival eVisa

== Visa exemption ==
Citizens of the following countries as well as refugees and stateless persons residing in these countries can visit Guinea without a visa:

- All ECOWAS member states
- Algeria
- Burkina Faso
- Egypt
- Mali
- Morocco
- Namibia
- Niger
- Rwanda
- Singapore (30 days)
- Tunisia

In addition, according to Timatic, nationals of China holding ordinary passports endorsed "for public affairs" do not require a visa for a maximum stay of 30 days.

Date of visa changes

Visa free

- 30 April 1980: ECOWAS (Economic Community of West African States): Benin, Burkina Faso, Cape Verde, Gambia, Ghana, Guinea, Guinea-Bissau, Ivory Coast, Liberia, Mali, Niger, Nigeria, Senegal, Sierra Leone, Togo
- 25 September 2018: Singapore

Visa on arrival

- 19 April 2018: United Arab Emirates

=== Non-ordinary passports ===
Additionally, holders of diplomatic or service passports issued to nationals of China, Romania, Russia, South Africa and Zimbabwe do not require a visa for a maximum stay of 90 days. Holders of diplomatic passports of Turkey do not require a visa for a stay of up to 90 days.

== Visa on arrival ==
According to Timatic, nationals of the United Arab Emirates can obtain a visa on arrival for a maximum stay of 90 days. This information, however, is not supported by the official website of the Central Directorate of the Border Police (DCPAF) of the Ministry of Security and Civil Protection of Guinea, which states that UAE nationals must obtain an eVisa.

== Electronic Visa (e-Visa) ==
Nationals of all countries and territories that require a visa can obtain an electronic visa. The e-Visa is available for stays up to 90 days.. The fee is $100 for stays of up to 90 days. Processing typically takes 3–4 business days, however, delays may occur.

Citizens of Canada and the United States who obtain an e-Visa can stay in Guinea for up to 5 years.

== See also ==
- Visa requirements for Guinean citizens
