= Kanfamoriyah =

- Sub-prefecture
- Location in Guinea
- Coordinates: 10°33′N 9°25′W
- Country: Guinea
- Region: Kankan Region
- Prefecture: Kankan Prefecture

Population (2014)
  - Total: 24,858
- Time zone: UTC+0 (GMT)

Karfamoria is a town and sub-prefecture in the Kankan Prefecture in the Kankan Region of eastern Guinea. As of 2014 it had a population of 24,858 people.
