= N1 road (Guinea) =

Road in Guinea

Location
- Country: Guinea

Highway system
- Transport in Guinea

The N1 is a national highway of Guinea. It connects the city of Conakry to Nzerekore and to the north with Kankan and eventually by the N7 road and N32 road to the border with Mali. It also passes through the city of Kouroussa.
