= Milo River =

Milo
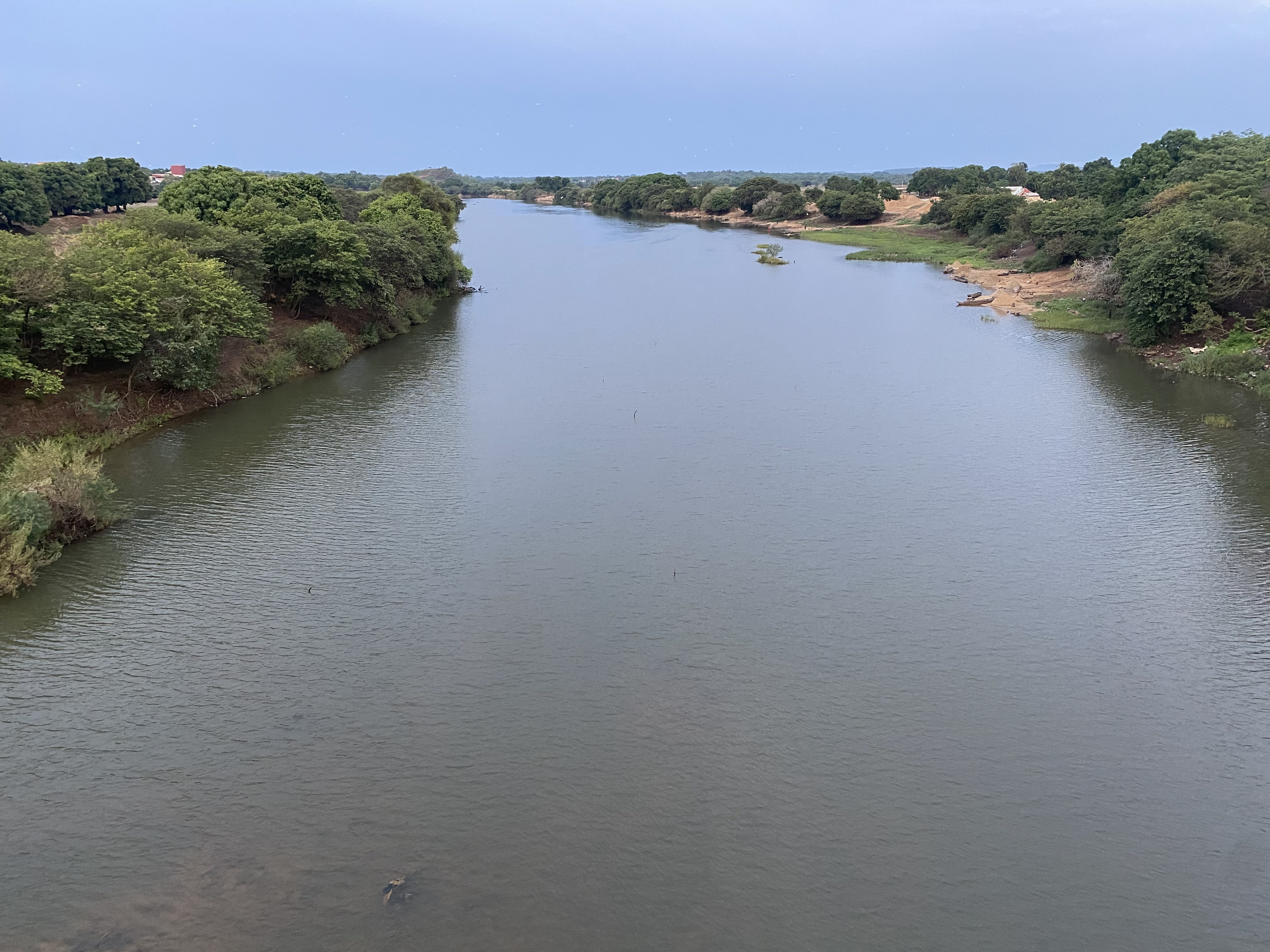

- Location of the mouth within Guinea
- Native name: ߡߌߟߏ (N'Ko)

Location
- Country: Guinea

Physical characteristics
- Mouth
  - location: River Niger
  - coordinates: 11°04′13″N 9°13′25″W

The Milo River is a river in Guinea in West Africa. It rises in the Simandou Mountains near Beyla, flows about 20 kilometres (12 mi) to the south of Siguiri and flows 300 kilometres (190 mi) north at which point it becomes one of the main tributaries of the River Niger.

The pre-colonial Baté Empire was founded in the seventeenth century and was situated in the Milo River valley. In the colonial period, the river was a valuable transportation route, as it was navigable to shallow-draft vessels from Kankan to the Niger River.
