= Kankan =

Kankan ߞߊ߲ߞߊ߲߫ (Eastern Maninkakan)
- Sub-prefecture and town
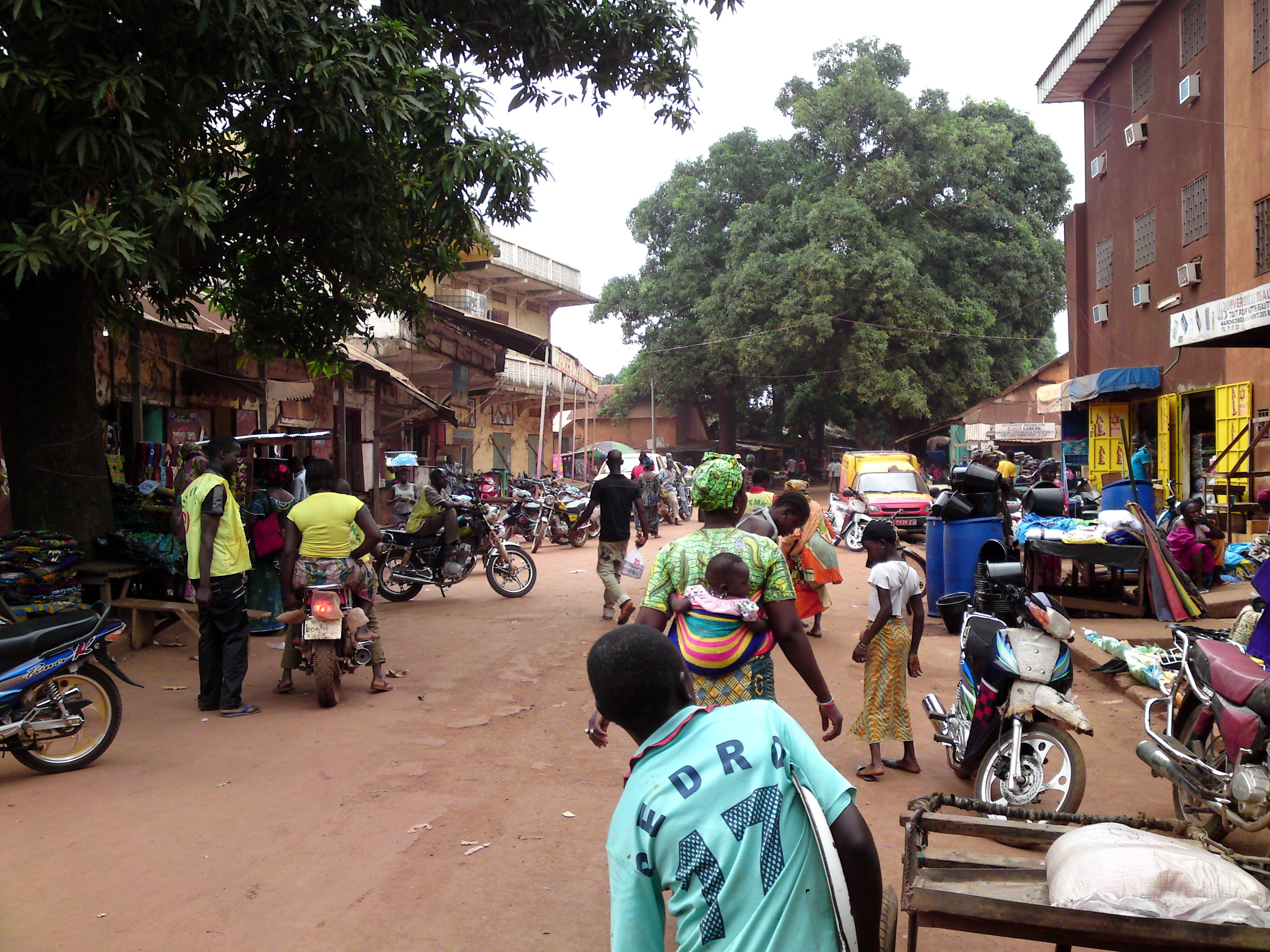
- Downtown Kankan

- Location within Guinea
- Coordinates: 10°23′N 9°18′W
- Country: Guinea
- Region: Kankan Region
- Prefecture: Kankan Prefecture

Government
  - Mayor: Mory Kolofon Diakité

Population (1 July 2025)
  - Total: 410,542

Kankan (Mandingo: Kánkàn; N’ko: ߞߊ߲ߞߊ߲߫) is the largest city in Guinea in land area, and the second largest in population, with a population of 410,542 people as at the Census of 1 July 2025. The city is located in eastern Guinea about 555 kilometres (345 miles) east of the national capital Conakry.

The city is the capital and largest town of the Kankan Prefecture and of the Kankan Region with its population being largely from the Mandinka ethnic group.

== Etymology ==
Kankan had different names before being dubbed Kankan during Arafan Kabine's rule as patriarch, which means 'the defenses' (or 'God protect our city from all the attacks'), due to successives attacks by the unfaithful people.

But there are other terms which says that during the Kaba's negotiation of the place from Conde's, they were informed to install where the people made the Kankan (A fixed wood that Mandes often used as a door), and there were no other human settlement between Makonon and Diankana (30 km) during this moment.

The other terms are used by the griots, that there were too much of the Kankan-Kissè (an arborescent name) in to the area that Kankan settled in, so the Conde's told the Kaba to install this place, which made the Kaba to rename it as Kankan. Those terms have no sources and the speakers didn't know anything about Kankan's history.

== Geography ==
The city is located on the Milo River, a tributary of the Niger River.

== History ==
=== Early history ===
According to oral histories, Kankan was founded in 1690 by Daouda Kaba, whose ancestors had come from Diafounou, in what is now Mali, a few decades earlier. His uncle Fodemoudou Conde, chief of the nearby village Makonon, gave Kaba the land on the banks of the Milo river near where the bridge is today, which was open bush. The hamlet was originally called Fadou (place of plenty), then Kaourou (prosperous place), then Nabaya (place of welcome).

Another tradition holds that Kankan was founded in the mid 17th century by Dyula traders of the Sarif and Sanyo families. By the 18th century it was an important religious center under the great marabout and Islamic scholar Alfa Kaabinè Kaba as well as a center of trade linking the coast, the kola nut growing regions, and the Niger river valley to the north. During this period Kankan was the capital of the Bate Empire.

In 1763 the warlord Bourama Diakite from Wassoulou drove the inhabitants of the Bate region, including Kankan, intto Fouta Jalon, where they took refuge in Timbo and Fougoumba due to their shared Islamic background. Their exile lasted seven years. Upon their return in 1770 they rebuilt and fortified the town and renamed it Kankan, meaning 'protected city'. The new town was built in six districts, two of which were named after the towns that had sheltered their inhabitants during exile. Timbo neighborhood still exists today..

Another later invasion from Wassoulou, led by the kings Diédi and Djiba (or DJI), attempted to conquer Kankan but it was defeated by Alpha-Mamoudou Kaba..

The French explorer René Caillié spent a month in Kankan in 1827 during his journey from Boké, in present-day Guinea, to Djenné and Timbuktu in Mali. He arrived with a caravan transporting kola nuts. He described the visit in his book Travels through Central Africa to Timbuctoo. The town had a population of 6,000 inhabitants and was an important commercial centre with a market held three times a week. Instead of having a surrounding mud wall, the town was defended by quickset hedges. The chief of the town refused Caillié permission to travel along the river to the north as the town of Kankan was fighting for control of the Bouré gold producing area around Siguiri and the Tinkisso River. Instead Caillié left the town heading east in the direction of Minignan in the Ivory Coast.

=== Alliance with Samori and conflict ===
After defeating Jamoro Aji and Ouorokodo Famoudou in the Battle of Saman-Saman, Kankan sent emissaries to join the theocratic alliance led by Samori Ture and signed the peace treaty with him.

While Samori was trying to conquering the Cissé kingdom, he called on Bate (Kankan) to help him, but Kankan categorically refused because one of the Séré-Bréma's wives, Mali Kaba, was from Kankan. Samori saw this as a betrayal, and in 1879 sent troops to besiege the town within three months. Mamadi Kaba (commonly known as Dayi Kaba) escaped the besieged city. During this siege, Karifamoudouya sent troops to break the siege over Kankan, but they were repelled and massacred until they crossed the River Gbourouroun, the border between two cities.. After having driven out the Kaba, Samori installed a puppet ruler. Kaba, meanwhile, joined the French colonial forces in Ségou, fighting with them until they captured Kankan in 1891, at which point the dynasty was restored.

=== Colonial Era ===
In 1904, the city was chosen as the final destination for the railroad originating in Conakry. This was eventually completed in 1914, enhancing Kankan's longstanding position as a crossroads of trade. By 1922 it was widely seen as the second city of Guinea, after the capital Conkary.

== Climate ==
Kankan has a tropical savanna climate (Köppen climate classification Aw).

Climate data for Kankan (1991–2020)
Month	Jan	Feb	Mar	Apr	May	Jun	Jul	Aug	Sep	Oct	Nov	Dec	Year
Mean daily maximum °C (°F)	34.4 (93.9)	36.7 (98.1)	37.9 (100.2)	37.3 (99.1)	35.0 (95.0)	32.3 (90.1)	30.7 (87.3)	30.4 (86.7)	31.1 (88.0)	32.7 (90.9)	34.3 (93.7)	34.4 (93.9)	33.9 (93.0)
Daily mean °C (°F)	24.7 (76.5)	27.6 (81.7)	30.1 (86.2)	30.6 (87.1)	28.9 (84.0)	26.9 (80.4)	25.9 (78.6)	25.8 (78.4)	25.9 (78.6)	26.9 (80.4)	26.5 (79.7)	24.7 (76.5)	27.0 (80.6)
Mean daily minimum °C (°F)	15.0 (59.0)	18.4 (65.1)	22.4 (72.3)	23.9 (75.0)	22.8 (73.0)	21.5 (70.7)	21.1 (70.0)	21.1 (70.0)	20.8 (69.4)	21.0 (69.8)	18.7 (65.7)	15.0 (59.0)	20.1 (68.2)
Average precipitation mm (inches)	3.5 (0.14)	4.5 (0.18)	18.4 (0.72)	48.3 (1.90)	132.3 (5.21)	181.3 (7.14)	235.2 (9.26)	352.2 (13.87)	314.8 (12.39)	132.8 (5.23)	18.5 (0.73)	0.0 (0.0)	1,441.8 (56.76)
Average precipitation days (≥ 1.0 mm)	0.5	0.5	2.0	4.5	8.9	13.2	14.7	19.2	18.2	10.7	1.3	0.0	93.7
Average relative humidity (%)	38	35	38	49	63	73	77	79	77	75	57	46	59
Mean monthly sunshine hours	262	236	249	220	234	216	169	159	191	221	241	260	2,658
Source: NOAA (humidity, sun 1961–1990)

== Education ==
The Julius Nyerere University of Kankan was founded in 1964.

== Places of worship ==
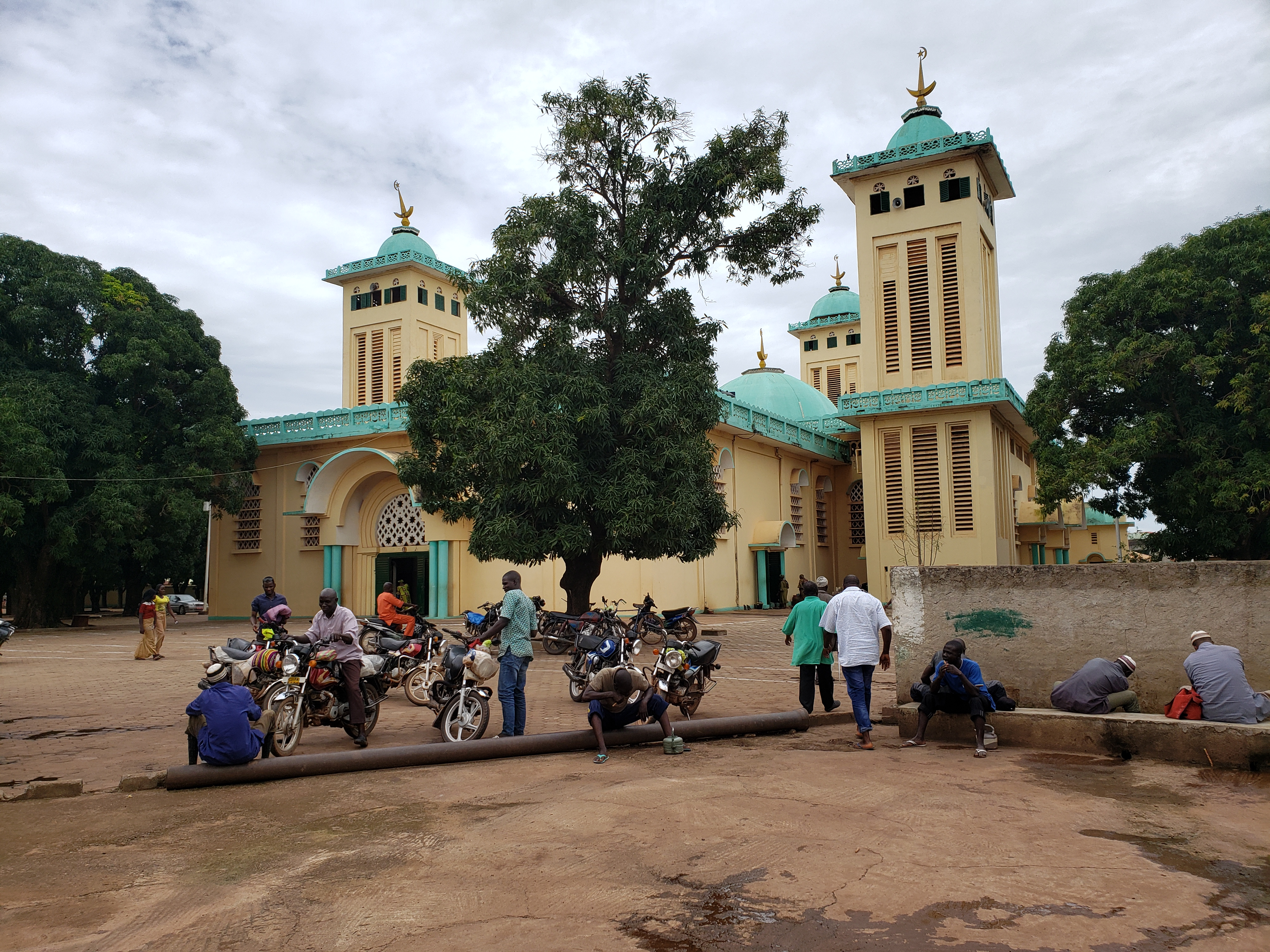
The great Mosque of Kankan

Among the places of worship, they are predominantly Muslim mosques. There are also Christian churches and temples : the Roman Catholic Diocese of Kankan (Catholic Church), Église Protestante Évangélique de Guinée (Alliance World Fellowship), Assemblies of God.

== Transport ==
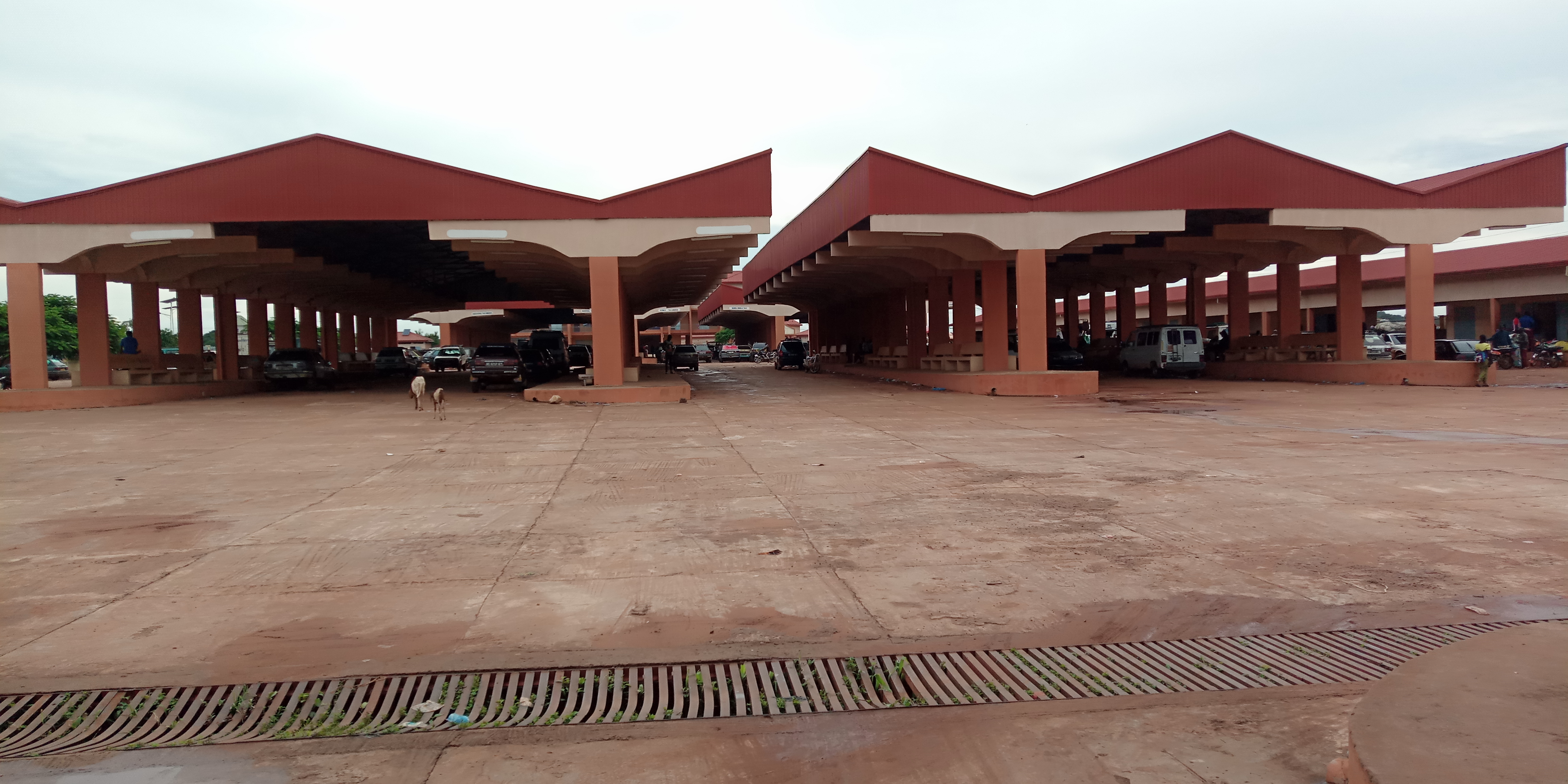
Regional parking of Kankan

Kankan is home to the Kankan Airport and to a river port. Kankan is the terminus of the lightduty narrow gauge railway from Conakry (traffic suspended since 1993). The N1 highway connects the city with Nzerekore in the south.

== Notable people ==
- Solomana Kanté (1922-1987), inventor of the N'Ko script
- Mamady Doumbouya (b. 1984), president of Guinea since 2021
