= Kankan Region =

Region of Guinea

Coordinates: 10°30′N 9°15′W

Kankan
- Region
- Kankan Region in Guinea
- Country: Guinea
- Capital: Kankan

Government
  - Governor: Aboubacar Diakité

Area
  - Total: 72,145 km^{2} (27,855 sq mi)

Population (2025 census)
  - Total: 4,110,215
  - Density: 56.972/km^{2} (147.56/sq mi)
- HDI (2023): 0.421 low · 8th of 8

Kankan Region (N'Ko: ߞߊ߲ߞߊ߲߫ ߕߌ߲߬ߞߎߘߎ߲) is a region of Guinea located in the east of the country. It is the largest region of Guinea by area, covering an area of 72,145 km^{2}; and it had a population of 4,110,215 at the Census on 1 July 2025. The region is divided into five prefectures (Kankan, Kérouané, Kouroussa, Mandiana and Siguiri).

It is bordered by the countries of Mali and Côte d'Ivoire and the Guinean regions of Nzérékoré and Faranah.

== Administrative divisions ==
Kankan Region is divided into five prefectures; which are further sub-divided into 58 sub-prefectures:

Prefecture	Capital	Land Area (km^{2})	Population 2014 Census	Population 2025 Census	Number of Sub-prefectures
Kankan Prefecture	Kankan	19,750	473,359	841,969	13
Kérouané Prefecture	Kérouané	7,020	207,547	297,935	8
Kouroussa Prefecture	Kouroussa	14,050	268,630	451,205	12
Mandiana Prefecture	Mandiana	12,825	335,999	800,959	12
Siguiri Prefecture	Siguiri	18,500	687,002	1,718,147	13
