= Mamady Keïta =

Guinean drummer (1950–2021)

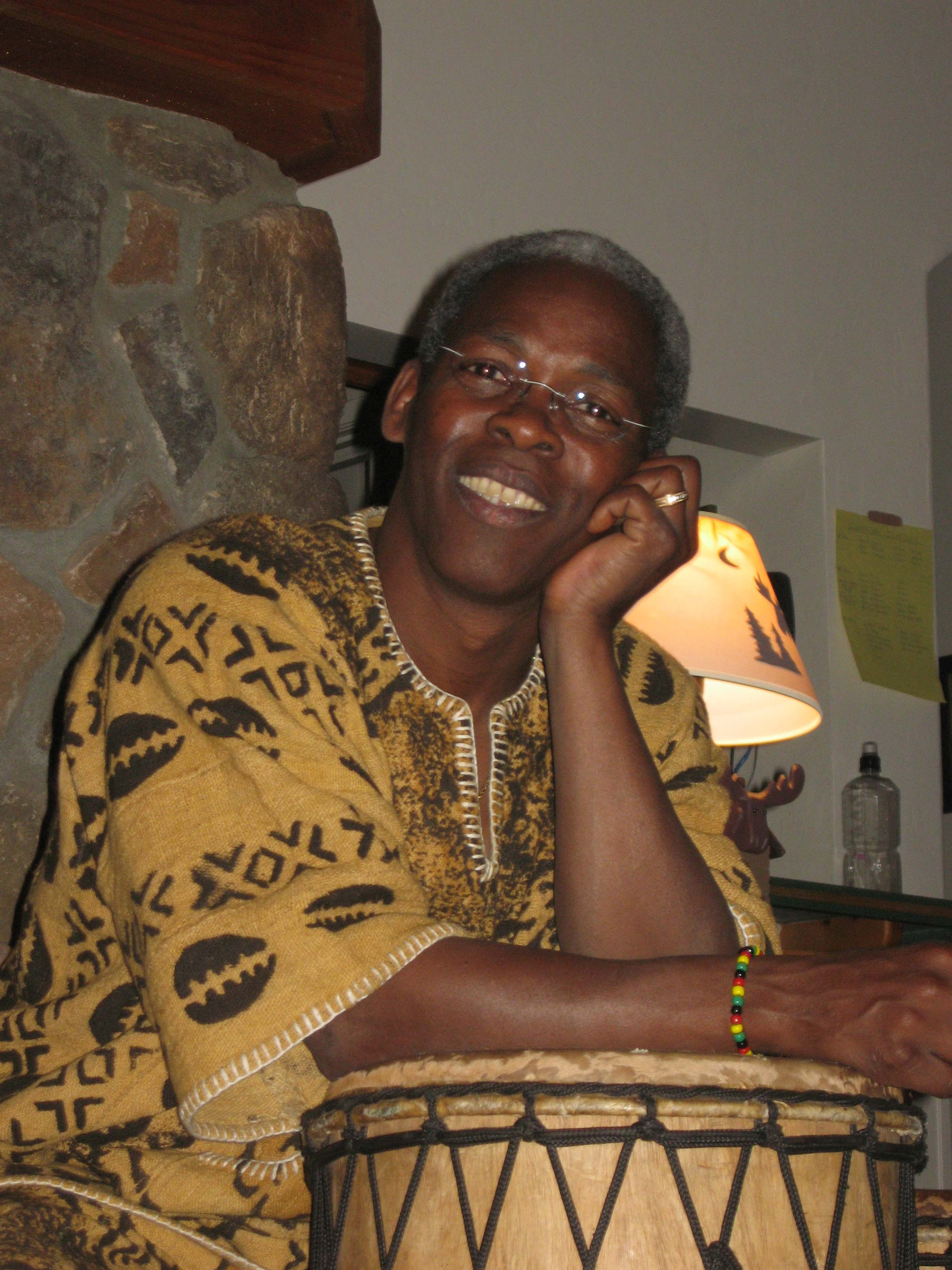
- Born: August 1950; Balandougou, Guinea
- Died: 21 June 2021 (aged 70); Brussels, Belgium
- Occupation: Djembefola

Mamady Keïta (Note: Surname sometimes spelled Keita.) (August 1950 – 21 June 2021) was a Guinean drummer who specialized in the djembe. He was also the founder of the Tam Tam Mandingue school of drumming. He was a member of the Manding ethnic group.

== Early life ==
Keïta was born in the small village of Balandougou, Guinea, in the northeastern prefecture of Siguiri, near the border of Mali. Keïta was a direct descendant of the king Sundiata Keita. By the age of five, he had developed his own technique of tone, slap, bass and learned the rhythms of his village and was playing Djembe in all of the ceremonies, celebrations and festivals. Technically, his initiation to the djembe started at the early age of seven, under Karinkadjan Kondé, elder master djembefola of Balandugu, who initiated him to the secrets of the djembe. Keïta was educated in the traditions of his village, learning the history and music of the Malinke people. At the age of twelve, he became a member of the first regional federal ballet of Siguiri after Balanka Sidiki, a recruiter for the group, came to Balandugu looking for performers.

== Career ==
At the time, Guinea was governed by Sékou Touré, who put special emphasis on Guinean culture through live performances and a system of local, regional, and national competitions that recruited the greatest artists of the land. During the National Festival in 1964, Keïta, then aged fourteen, along with fifty other percussionists and numerous other artists, was selected by Guinea's Minister of Culture to form Le Ballet National Djoliba (The Djoliba National Ballet), which was intended to serve as a showcase for Touré's revolution in Guinea. After nine months of training, he was one of only five percussionists retained.

He was appointed lead soloist of Ballet Djoliba in 1965 and, in 1979, became its artistic director. He stayed with Ballet Djoliba until 1986, when he joined Ballet Koteba in Côte d'Ivoire.

In 1988, Keïta moved to Belgium where he worked as a performer and teacher. In 1991, he opened his first school Tam Tam Mandingue percussion school in Brussels, to be followed by additional schools in Europe, North America, and Asia, each run by a school director personally certified by Keïta for his/her playing skill and teaching abilities.

Up until his death, Keïta worked as a performer with his group Sewa Kan and recorded a number of CDs. He also taught internationally, running international workshops in Europe, North America, and Asia, as well as an annual camp in Africa. He published a large body of djembe teaching materials on CD and DVD, as well as an instructional book.

He resided in Monterrey, Mexico. On 21 June 2021, Keïta died in Belgium after being admitted to hospital with a heart-related condition.

He performed with many other djembefola, including Bolokada Conde, Mohamed Diaby, Amara Kante, Barbara Bangoura, and many others. They all miss him very much, Bolokada Conde even created a rhythm for all passed djembefola but especially for Mamady.

== Discography ==
- 1989: Mamady Keïta & Sewa Kan, Wassolon, Fonti Musicali
- 1992: Mamady Keïta, Nankama, Fonti Musicali, 1992
- 1995: Mamady Keïta, Mögöbalu (double CD), Fonti Musicali
- 1996: Mamady Keïta, Hamanah (with Famoudou Konaté), Fonti Musicali
- 1998: Mamady Keïta & Sewa Kan, Afö, Fonti Musicali
- 2000: Mamady Keïta, Balandugu Kan (double CD), Fonti Musicali
- 2001: Mamady Keïta, Mamady Lèè, Fonti Musicali
- 2002: Mamady Keïta, Agiatè, Fonti Musicali
- 2004: Mamady Keïta, Djembe Master (compilation of tracks from previous albums), Nocturne (rough trade)
- 2004: Mamady Keïta, Sila Laka, Fonti Musicali
- 2005: Mamady Keïta & Sewa Kan, Live @ Couleur Cafe, Fenix Music & ZigZag World
- 2007: Mamady Keïta, Mandeng Djara, Fonti Musicali
- 2010: Mamady Keïta & Sewa Kan, Hakili (DVD & CD package), ZigZag World & CristalRecords

== Films ==
- 1967: Africa Dance (with Harry Belafonte).
- 1987: La Vie Platinee. Directed by Claude Cadiou.
- 1991: Djembefola. Directed by Laurent Chevallier.
- 1998: Mögöbalu. Directed by Laurent Chevallier.
- 2003: Djembe Kan. Directed by Monette Marino. Publisher: Tam Tam Mandingue USA.
- 2005: Mamady Keïta and Sewa Kan: Live @ Couleur Café. Publisher: Fenix Music.
- 2010: Hakili (DVD & CD package). Directed by Thierry Villeneuve. Publisher: ZigZag World & CristalRecords.
- 2012: Messengers of Tradition. Publisher: Tam Tam Mandingue USA.

== Instructional videos ==
- 1998: Rythmes Traditionnels du Mandeng—Debutant
- 1998: Rythmes Traditionnels du Mandeng—Moyens
- 1998: Rythmes Traditionnels du Mandeng—Avances
  Djembe and dunun instructional VHS tapes, re-released on DVD in 2011. Publisher: Djembefola Productions.
- 2004: Guinée: Les Rythmes du Mandeng, Volume 1. Publisher: Fonti Musicali.
- 2004: Guinée: Les Rythmes du Mandeng, Volume 2. Publisher: Fonti Musicali.
- 2004: Guinée: Les Rythmes du Mandeng, Volume 3. Publisher: Fonti Musicali.
  Djembe and dunun instructional DVDs for beginner, intermediate, and advanced levels.
- 2009: Guinée: Les Rythmes du Mandeng, Volume 4—Solos, breaks, techniques No. 1. Publisher: Fonti Musicali.
  Djembe and dunun instructional DVD, focussed on soloing technique.

== Instructional CDs ==
- 2004: Djembe Rhythms No. 1: Diansa
- 2004: Djembe Rhythms No. 2: Djabara
- 2004: Djembe Rhythms No. 3: Garangedon
- 2004: Djembe Rhythms No. 4: Kotedjuga
- 2004: Djembe Rhythms No. 5: Soli Rapide
- 2004: Djembe Rhythms No. 6: Soko
- 2004: Djembe Rhythms No. 7: Kuku
- 2004: Djembe Rhythms No. 8: Mendiani
- 2004: Djembe Rhythms No. 9: Soli des Manian
- 2004: Djembe Rhythms No. 10: Yankadi
- 2004: Djembe Rhythms No. 11: Soboninkun
- 2004: Djembe Rhythms No. 12: Wassolonka
  Djembe and dunun instructional CDs. Each presents a Solo Original that illustrates typical solo phrases and style for the rhythm.
- 2016 Anta! Available in Club TTM (TTMDA.com/clubttm)

== Instructional books ==
- Billmeier, Uschi; Keïta, Mamady (2004) [First published 1999 as a three-language edition (English, German, and French), ISBN 3-927940-61-5]. A Life for the Djembé—Traditional Rhythms of the Malinké (5th ed.). Kirchhasel-Uhlstädt: Arun-Verlag. ISBN 978-3-935581-52-3.
  Notation for over sixty traditional rhythms. Includes historical information about the djembe, biographical notes, and a CD with demonstrations of 21 rhythms.
- Keita, Mamady (2014). Nankama (ebook). BookBaby.
  Notation for 25 traditional rhythms and 47 rhythms composed by Keita.
- Keïta, Mamady (2016). ISBN 978-9-810912-27-7 Curriculum for traditional djembe & dunun (1st ed.) Tam Tam Mandingue Djembe Academy.
