= Hand drum =

Drum typically played with bare hands

A hand drum is any type of drum that is typically played with the bare hand rather than a stick, mallet, hammer, or other type of beater.

== Types ==
The following descriptions allude to traditional versions of the drums. Modern synthetic versions are available for most if not all of the drums listed through various manufacturers.

=== Africa ===
- The most common African drum known to westerners is the djembe, a large, single-headed drum with a goblet shape.
- The Ashiko is another African drum in the shape of a truncated cone. Similar to the Djembe it is rope strung. This drum is easily recognized as having straight sides (many actually have a slight curve but appear straight compared to most hand drums). The ashiko contrary to popular belief is traditionally mounted with wild game heads such as a gazelle. Most modern Ashikos are made with goat skin as a matter of convenience or legality. A more traditional-sounding Ashiko can be created using hand-picked goat skins that imitate the game skin or using deer skin (which requires more frequent tuning and maintenance). Ashiko drums are quite popular but less so than other types of hand drums and the difficulty in making sound as it should traditionally probably explains why they are less common. Most Ashikos found in common use have a non-traditional sound to them due to different skin types being used.
- Bougarabou are African drums with cow skin heads. The base of the um drum is shorter than a djembe and the goblet shape less pronounced. (This is believed by some to be the African traditional predecessor of the Conga.)
- The Dundun talking drum, is a class of hour glass shaped drum that is popular amongst the Yoruba people of West Africa. Dun-dun literarily translates to "Sweet-Sound". The class includes the largest in the ensemble Iya-Ilu (mother drum) and other smaller category like Ijin, Gangan, Adamo, and the smallest of the ensemble is called kanago. Depending on the parts of the Yoruba region, other types of Dundun drum in between may be available.
- The Batá drum is often used for spiritual worship of Sango in Yoruba, Cuba and Brazil. It has drums in category of Iya Ilu (mother drum) and other smaller drums. Omele Bata is a triplet bunch of strapped drums in the Bata Drum Category.
- The Gudu-gudu drum is a pace-maker drum that is used in both Dundun and Bata drum category.
- The Bembe drum is a Yoruba bass drum. The modern bass drum in drum sets used by professional musicians and military/school parades is an example of modified bemebe drum.
- The Ipese drum is used for Yoruba Spiritual worship of Ifa.
- The Igbin drum is used for Yoruba Spiritual worship of Obatala.
- Another type of drum family called Dundun is from Guinea. This is different from the Yoruba talking drum. It has 3 types of drums, the Dundun Songba and Kenke.

=== Europe ===
- The Irish Bodhrán is sometimes played with the bare hand.

=== Far East and India ===
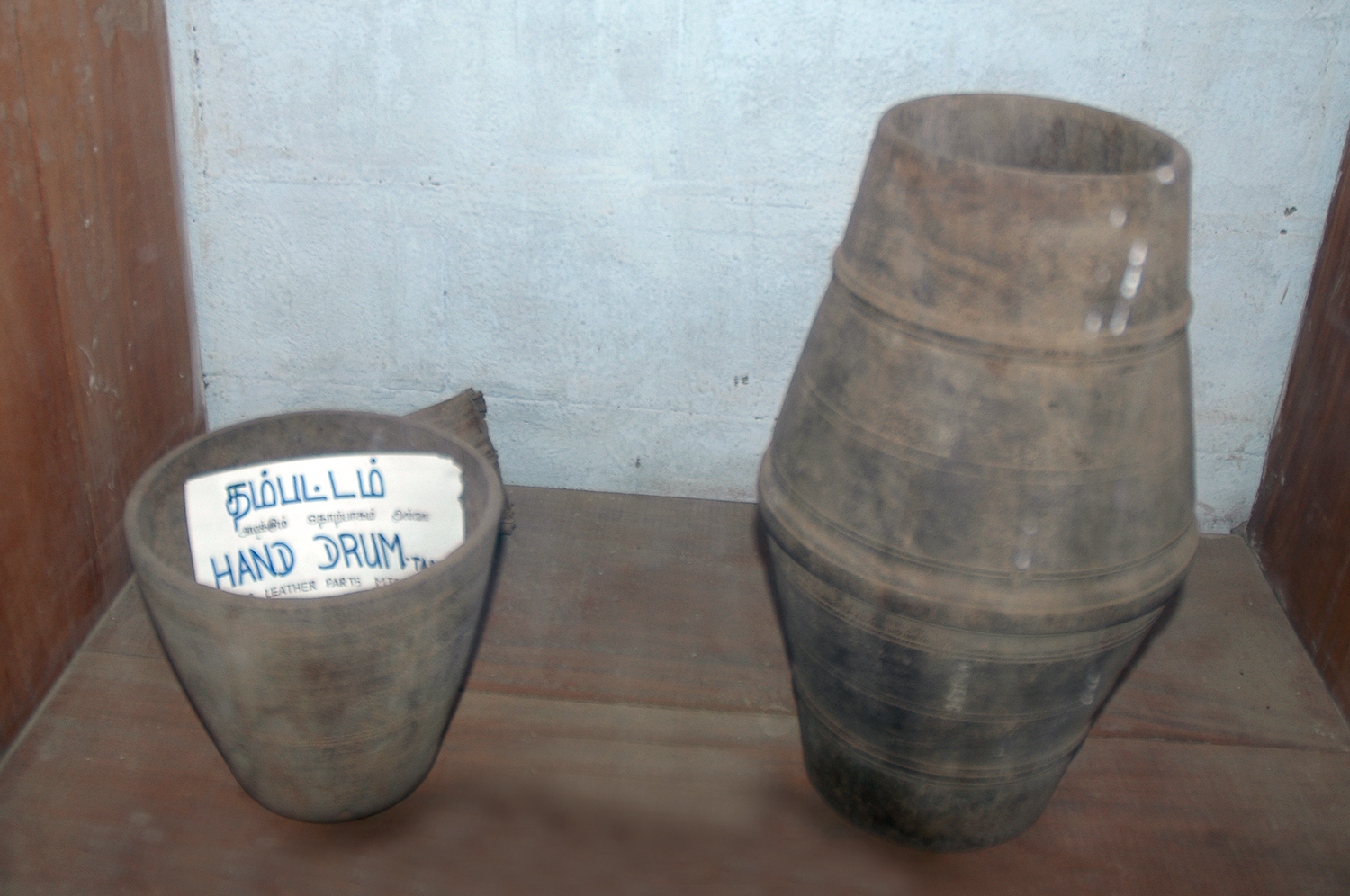
Ancient hand drum without leathers at archaeological museum of Jaffna, Sri Lanka.

- Tabla are central to Indian music.
- The mridangam takes the main spot in Indian classical (Carnatic) music.
- Kanjiras accompany the mridangam in carnatic music.
- Răbāna or Raban, Gáta Béra, Yak Béra and Udákkiya are used in Sri Lankan music.
- One drum head in Daŭla is played by hand, which is again used in Sri Lanka.
- Dhōlki is used both in Sri Lanka and India.
- Klong yao is the Thai "long drum" which is shaped like an elongated or stretched goblet and rope tuned.
- The tsuzumi (kotsuzumi) and the ōtsuzumi are Japanese hand drums, used in traditional Noh and Kabuki theatres.
  - The Den-den daiko is a Japanese hand-held drum, used in Shinto-Buddhist ceremonies, etc.

=== Latin percussion ===
- Congas and bongos are essential to all kinds of Latin American music, especially that of the Caribbean and South American regions, used in both folklore (punta, santeria, rumba, etc.) and popular music such as merengue, salsa, son, boleros, bachata, cumbia, latin jazz, and others.
- The Tambora, a two-sided drum played with both a stick and a hand, is essential to the merengue dance of Dominican Republic.
- The pandero or plenera, is a percussion instrument included in the group of frame drums. A set of these hand drums from Puerto Rico is usually performed in plena music. There are three sizes, primo or requinto (for playing solos), segundo or seguidor, and tercero or tumbador (for playing a fixed rhythm).
- The maracas and timbales are widely played in popular music.
- The cajón is a box-shaped percussion instrument originating from Peru, primarily played in Afro-Peruvian music, as well as contemporary styles of flamenco and jazz.
- The Ilu is popular in Pernambuco and Ceará.

=== Middle and Near East ===
- The tar is a frame drum common in Middle Eastern music.
- The tambourine is a frame drum with jingles attached to the shell.
- The daf and the dayereh are Iranian frame drums.
- The ghaval is the Azerbaijani frame drum.
- The tonbak is the Persian goblet drum.
- The doumbek is a goblet shaped drum used in Arabic, Jewish, Assyrian, Persian, Balkan, Greek, Armenian, Azeri and Turkish music.
- Mirwas

=== North America ===
- A drum used in powwows is called a hand drum, but is typically used with a mallet.
