= Drissa Kone =

Malian musician

Drissa Koné
- Born: Kourouba, Mali
- Origin: Bamako, Mali
- Genre: Traditional Malian
- Occupation: musician
- Instruments: Djembe
- Years active: 1970–present

Drissa Kone is a djembe master drummer from Mali.

== Early life ==
Drissa Kone was born in a village named Kourouba, around 100 km (62 mi) south of the capital, Bamako. At an early age, and against the will of his parents, he began drumming in his home village. When he was 13 years old he moved to the capital city Bamako, to study under Yamadu Bani Dunbia.

== Career ==
In the 1980s Drissa toured throughout Mali as a popular festival drummer and soloist for numerous ballets.

In 1989 he met the artists Ulli Sanou and Gerhard Kero in Mali, who after intensive instruction became well-liked members of his festival music ensemble. In 1991 he went to Europe for the first time to join their music group SANZA, performing at many concerts with them in the following seven years. The recordings SANZA live and SANZA in search of the one were made during this time. Later engagements took Drissa to France, Spain, Norway, Germany and Switzerland.

In the summer of 2006, he headed a two-week special seminar for professionals at the Codarts University for the Arts in Rotterdam. In 2009 he became an instructor at the Dj.e.m.be- Djembe education moduls beatfactory. In 2011 he was teaching at the international festival Impulstanz in Vienna.

He is regarded as a master drummer.

== Discography ==
- 1992 - SANZA live EX 141-2
- 1994 - SANZA in search of the 1 EX220-2
- 2007 - Kurubamako EX697-2 beatfactory production
- 2007 - appearing also on - Argile - Filefola: The Flute Album (bibiafrica records)
- 2008 - The Art of Jenbe Drumming - The Mali Tradition Vol. 2 (bibiafrica records)
