= Les Ballets maliens =

Malian Ballet company

Les Ballets maliens is a Malian dance troupe created under the name Ensemble folklorique du Mali in 1960, the day before the independence of Mali on September 22.

By 1978, Les Ballets maliens had evolved into an artistic group specializing in traditional Malian dance, but open to the innovations of contemporary dance and choreography.

== Repertoire ==
- The dance of the possessed
- The dance of Bamanan or Bambara masks
- Madan
- Sunu
- Achagal : Dance tamashek
- Kanaga : dance of Dogon masks
- Dance of the horse
- Dansa
- Mabaji
- Dance of Tambours
- L’épopée Mandingue (Ballet)
- Fura (Ballet)
- Cigele (Ballet)
- Bolon Sira
- Sigi tè môgô-son
- Lolon ni kolongala

== Tours ==
- 1972 : USA (77 performances)
- 1976 : Festival des Arts Nègres at Lagos (Nigeria)
- 1985 : Festival Panafricain de la jeunesse at Tripoli, Libya
- 1990 : International Festival of Music and Dance at Kuopio (Finland)
- 1990 : Festival international de danse of Fort de France (Martinique)
- 1997 : New Orleans International Jazz Festival (USA)
- 1998 : Participation at the last Exposition mondiale de Lisbonne, Portugal
- 1999 : Performance at the opening ceremony of the Sommet de l’OUA (Algeria)
- 2000 : Participation at the Festival Asilah (Morocco)
- 2000 : Participation at the Exposition universelle de 2000 at Hanover in Germany
- 2001 : Participation at the Festival of the 33rd Anniversary of Grande Jamahiriyya arabe libyenne at Tripoli, Libya
- 2002 : Japan (Tokyo and Kyoto)

== Awards ==
- 1963 : Gold medal of folklore at the Théâtre des Nations at Paris
- 1966 : First prize at the Festival des Arts Nègres of Dakar (Senegal)
- 1994 : Gold medal at the Afro-Arabe Fair in Tunisia
- 2002 : First prize at the Festival Africain de Folklore de Guinée FESTALOG

== Instruments ==
All the instruments of Malian traditional music are employed by Les Ballets – djembé, dundun, balafon, ngoni, tamani, M'Polon, uru, Yabara, Karignan, and Daro (bell).
