= Master drummer =

In African drumming, the title of master drummer (alternatively called the lead drummer or mother drummer) is given to a drummer who is well known by other masters for their high skill and knowledge. It is a title passed down from a master to their pupil, after they have learned all there is to know about the African drum.

In general, a master drummer has given their whole life to the djembe and dunun. They are able to play any part of any rhythm for their ethnic group and neighbouring ethnic groups, in any ceremonial situation. They also know the songs and dances that go with each rhythm. A drummer can play for twenty years before he or she is given the status of 'Master'.

Another type of master drummer is a person who leads other drummers in playing drum rhythms, e.g. in the French Caribbean styles, the master drummer may be called "kamande" in French Creole.

The master drummer can also lead the other drummers through a well known dance.

== List of master drummers ==
Some well-known master drummers include:

- Bolokada Conde
- Soungalo Coulibaly
- Mare Sanogo
- Babatunde Olatunji
- Abdoulaye Diakité
- Yamadu Bani Dunbia
- Guem
- Mamady Keïta
- Mustapha Tettey Addy
- Famoudou Konaté
- Drissa Kone
- Okyerema Asante
- Doudou N'Diaye Rose
- Sikiru Adepoju
- Amadou Kienou

== Disambiguation ==
The term "master drummer" may also refer to an African live composer.
