= Dunun =

Generic term for a family of West African drums

- Dunun player at a wedding ceremony in Bamako, Mali

Percussion instrument
- Classification: Membranophone
- Hornbostel–Sachs classification: 211.212.1 (Directly struck membranophones, tubular drums, two usable membranes, single instruments)

More articles or information
- Djembe, Mandinka people

Dunun (Malinké: [ˈdu.nun]; plural dunun) (also spelled dundun or doundoun) is the generic name for a family of West African drums that have developed alongside the djembe in the Mande drum ensemble.

A dunun is a rope-tuned cylindrical drum with a rawhide skin at both ends, most commonly cow or goat. The drum is played with a stick. Depending on the region, a plain straight stick, curved stick with flat head (similar to the stick used for a tama), or a straight stick with a cylindrical head attached at right angles near one end may be used to strike the skin.

Traditionally, the drum is played horizontally (placed on a stand or worn with a shoulder strap). For a right-handed player, the right hand plays the skin and the left hand optionally plays a bell that may be mounted on top of the drum or held in the left hand. The latter style is popular in Mali and originally from the Khassonké people.

Three different sizes of dunun are commonly played in West Africa.

- The dundunba (also spelled dununba) is the largest dunun and has the lowest pitch. Typical size is 60–70 cm (24–28 in) in length and 40–50 cm (16–20 in) in diameter. "Ba" means "big" in the Malinké language, so "dundunba" literally means "big dunun".
- The sangban is of medium size, with higher pitch than the dundunba. Typical size is 50–60 cm (20–24 in) in length and 30–40 cm (12–16 in) in diameter.
- The kenkeni is the smallest dunun and has the highest pitch. Typical size is 45–50 cm (18–20 in) in length and 25–35 cm (9.8–13.8 in) in diameter.

Dunun are always played in an ensemble with one or more djembes.

== Nomenclature ==
The names of the drums are onomatopoeic, meaning that they sound like the thing they describe. This is common for West African instruments. Shekere (gourd rattle), sege sege (metal djembe rattle), kese kese (woven basket rattle), and kenken (a bell played with dunun) are Malinké onomatopoeic terms for other instruments that are commonly played together with dunun and djembe.

Dundunba, sangban, kenkeni, kensedeni, and kensereni are Malinké terms. (Kensedeni and kensereni are synonyms for kenkeni.) In Mali and northeast Guinea, the dundunba and sangban are often both referred to as jeli-dunun (also spelled djeli-dunun) because they were traditionally played by the jelis (French: griots). Among the Bamana people in Mali, the dundunba is known as khassonka dunun and the sangban is known as konkoni (played without a bell). There, the drums are headed with goatskin instead of the cowskin used elsewhere.

The name djun djun is a common western misnomer. There is no such word in the Malinké language and this term should not be used.

A dunun player is generically known as a dununfola (literally, "one who plays dunun"). Specifically, the kenkeni, sangban, and dununba players are referred to as kenkenifola, sangbanfola, and dununbafola, respectively.

The drum is also not to be confused with the dùndún, a type of talking drum used by the Yoruba people.

== Techniques ==
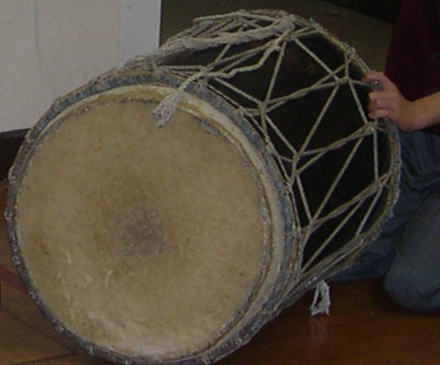
Dundunba from The Gambia

There are two primary playing styles for dununs. The traditional style or Mandingue style has each player using a single drum resting on its side, either on the floor or on a stand, and striking the head with one mallet and a bell mounted on top with the other. A melody is created across the interplay of the three dununs. For the other style, known as ballet style as it is used in the National Ballets, one player has command of the three dununs standing on the floor, allowing a more complex arrangement for the dance.

Ballet dunun
Three dunun, played upright by a single player without bells (ballet style)

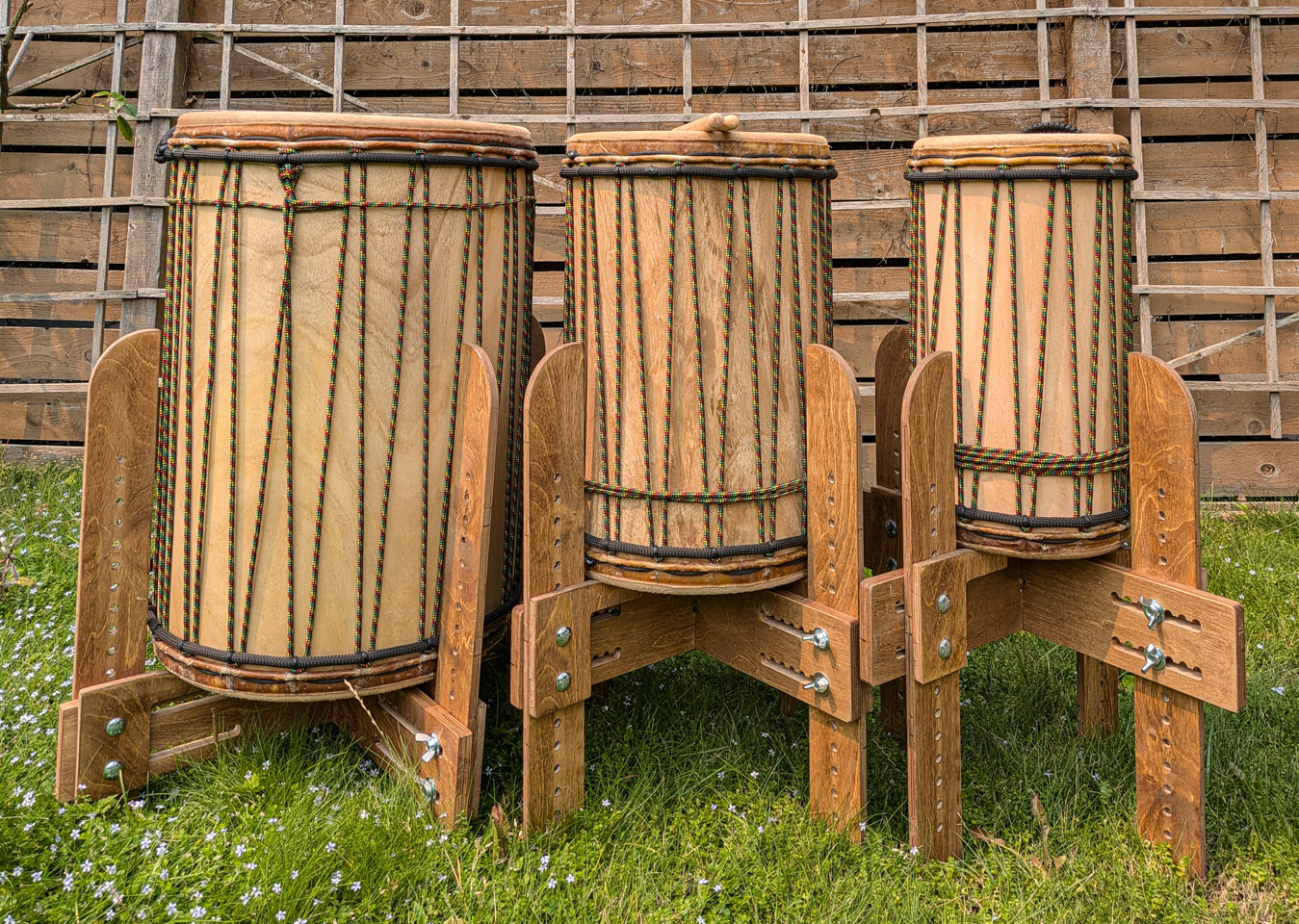
Three dununs, left to right Dununba, Sangban, Kenkini, all on ballet-style stands

There are wide variations on how the dunun is played throughout West Africa. In Mali they are sometimes played with just one dunun and a bell that is held in the hand.

In some regions of Guinea the dunun is played with no bells, or only two dunun are played. In some regions of Mali up to five dununs are played at the same time. In Hamanah, (Guinea) three dununs with bells are played. This style is one of the most known in the west, due to the influence of Mamady Keïta, Famoudou Konaté, Mohamed Diaby, Bolokada Conde, and other players from Guinea. It is formed of three dununs of different sizes; the kenkeni (smallest), sangban (medium) and dununba (largest). The kenkeni has the highest pitch and usually holds the rhythm together with a simple pattern. The sangban typically has a more complex part which defines the rhythm. The dununba often serves to add depth with deep, widely spaced notes. These drums provide a rhythmic and melodic base for the djembe ensemble.

In Bamako (Mali), a style of playing with two dunun developed. Both so called konkoni, have goat skin and are played without the bell. The konkoni with the highest pitch keeps the accompanying rhythm and the konkoni with the lowest pitch keeps the lead melody and solos.
In the Khassonké region of Mali, the biggest of the dununs has the leading role - making solos and leading the song.

== See also ==
- Djembe
