= Soungalo Coulibaly =

Soungalo Coulibaly (1955–2004) was a Malian master drummer.

Coulibaly was brought up in the purest Bambara tradition. His father was head of the village of Béléko (about a hundred kilometres from Ségou, in the Baninko region, southern Mali) like most traditional drummers, he gained his first musical experience at a very early age by accompanying work in the fields and playing at village celebrations on the bara and the sabani. He left Béléko for Fana, then for Côte d'Ivoire, and taught himself to play the djembe, seizing every opportunity to accompany the djembefola he met at celebrations, and adopting their music.

When Coulibaly moved to Bouaké, Côte d'Ivoire, in the mid-1970s, he immediately earned a name for himself through his remarkable musicality and his ability to adapt to all sorts of different styles. Those same qualities led to recognition in Europe, where he regularly presented concerts with his group, as well as giving courses. His three previous CDs are regarded as references by his peers.

Soungalo died on March 9, 2004, from cancer.

== Discography ==
- 1989 - Naya! (Cassette only, out of print)
- 1994 - Laïla Ilala
- 1995 - Dengo
- 2000 - Sankan Wulila
- 2002 - L'art du djembe
- 2004 - Live

== Films ==
- 2001 - Mögöbalu
- 2004 - Soungalo Coulibaly Live
