= Les Percussions de Guinée =

Les Percussions de Guinée was founded in 1987 by the Ministry of Information, Culture, and Tourism of the Republic of Guinea with the meeting between seven nationals drummers and the French artist François Kokelaere. It is a government sponsored national ballet of the finest percussionists, musicians, and dancers from Guinea, West Africa.

They present a performance inspired by traditional music set in a modern scenic presentation. The group is naturally oriented toward the music of the Guinean highland and the coastal region known for the djembe drum, but their influences are also drawn from the Guinea midland and the forest regions as well. In the tradition of the griots, the history of many of the ethnic groups is told through the medium of drum and dance performance. African-styled performing arts has transmitted traditional values, actual histories, and the spiritual energy of the African people for centuries.

The fifteen-member ensemble includes seven master drummers, chosen among the best soloists of Guinea's national companies, as well as members playing flute, balafon, kora, and traditional dancers.

== History ==
In 1952, a world-renowned dance company called Les Ballets Africains was established by artist Fodeba Keita, who had a rich legacy of connecting the cultures of Africa with the cultures of the world. Now, some 45 years later, this important work has been taken up by Mamoudou Conde, the charismatic relative of Fodeba.

Between 1987 and 1995, the company realized many tours around the world. In 1995, following political problems, François Kokelaere left the artistic direction (management) of the group which was confided to the national ballets.

Since 1994, Mamoudou has managed and directed performances in the Guinean Dance Company. In 1994, they received an award from the Rochester, New York Chamber of Commerce for their contribution to the development and promotion of the arts. This was the catalyst for the creation of World Music Production Inc. to preserve, spread, and promote the culture of Africa around the world.

In 1998, the Department of Arts and Culture of the Republic of Guinea appointed Mamoudou as the managing director and Producer of Les Percussions de Guinée, and to represent the Ministry of Youth and Culture of the Republic of Guinea worldwide. In 2000, he also began managing The Djoliba National Ballet of the Republic of Guinea (formerly managed by Harry Belafonte). In 2001, Mamoudou signed a contract with the Guinean government to manage Les Ballets Africans. In 2002, World Music Productions Inc. arranged for Les Percussions de Guinée to appear in the IMAX film, Pulse: A Stomp Odyssey. The first all-female Guinean percussion group, Amazones — Women Master Drummers of Guinea, was also officially created that year. In Mamoudou Conde's words, "it is very important that we teach our culture to everyone, especially the younger generation, so that the wisdom and value of our civilization is spread and honored throughout the world."

== Mission ==
The mission of Les Percussions de Guinée is to educate the people of the world about Guinean traditional values through music, drums, dance, and the storytelling of Africa's rich cultural legacy.
