= Abdoulaye Diakité =

Senegalese drummer

- Born: December 15, 1950; Tambacounda, Senegal
- Died: January 8, 2018 (aged 67) Tambacounda, Senegal
- Genres: West African drumming
- Occupations: Djembefola, Teacher
- Instrument: Djembe

Abdoulaye Diakité (December 15, 1950 – January 8, 2018) was an influential djembe master drummer and teacher from Tambacounda, Senegal. He was the lead djembe player of the National Ballet of Senegal for 18 years before emigrating to the United States.

== Early life ==
Born in Tambacounda in 1950, Diakité was a member of the Bamana (Bambara) ethnic group, a Mandé group centred in present-day Mali, with significant populations residing in neighboring West African countries.

Diakité began drumming at the age of seven. Throughout his youth, Diakité was known for his natural ability on the djembe drum. For many years, he studied with his teacher Suncaru Jara in Tambacounda. Jara's teacher was Chebleni Traore whose teacher was Numuni Traore, the first master drummer to take the djembe out of Bamana secrecy, igniting its diaspora.

At age 16, Diakité played at a festival in Tambacounda that would dramatically change his life. The National Ballet of Senegal was looking for a djembe player who sounded like the djembefola (djembe player) Dugufana Tarawele. There, they discovered Diakité.

== Career ==
In 1968, Diakité officially joined the National Ballet of Senegal. For the next 18 years until 1986, he traveled the world as their lead soloist. Upon completion of his last tour, Diakité chose to stay in the United States and make his home away from home in Oakland, California.

During the early 1990s in the Bay Area, Diakité founded Tambacounda Productions and co-founded Ceedo Senegalese Dance Company. He subsequently initiated a variety of recordings, performances, and activities including on an episode of Northern Exposure. The largest activity was the Tambacounda West African Drum and Dance Camp, founded in 1996 and held annually for a number of years. The summer camp was the first of its kind and deemed an inspiration to the expansion of West African drumming and dance in the United States.

Diakité frequently visited Santa Cruz, California in the 1990s where he inspired the founding of the West African drum shop Drumskull Drums. He instructed and guided many future djembe teachers affiliated with the shop. His educational philosophy embraced Jebe Bara or "unity of the drum." Diakité often spoke of spiritual aspects related to this in his djembe classes.

In October 2008, Diakité was hospitalized with carbon monoxide poisoning and subsequently faced health-related challenges. A benefit concert featuring Leon Mobley was held on February 20, 2009, in Berkeley, California. Though disabled by his medical condition, Diakité continued drumming and teaching devoted students until his death in 2018.

== Discography ==
- Mandingo Drumming (1992), with Leon Mobley
- JebeBara: The Bamana Djembe (2001), with Mamadou Sidibe
- Abdoulaye Diakité Rhythms of the Djembé, Volume 1 (2003)
- Abdoulaye Diakité Rhythms of the Djembé, Volume 2 (2003)
- Tambacounda Dunun ni Don (2004)
- Manden Foli (2005)
