= Balandougou, Guinea =

Balandougou
- Sub-prefecture and town
- Location in Guinea
- Coordinates: 10°33′N 9°08′W
- Country: Guinea
- Region: Kankan Region
- Prefecture: Kankan Prefecture

Government
  - Mayor: Yacouba Doumbouya

Population (2014)
  - Total: 27,554
- Time zone: UTC+0 (GMT)

Balandougou (also spelled Balandugu) is a town and sub-prefecture in the Kankan Prefecture in the Kankan Region of eastern Guinea. As of 2014 it had a population of 27,554 people. The mayor is Yacouba Doumbouya.
