= Bougarabou =

Set of drums commonly used in West Africa originating with the Jola ethnic group

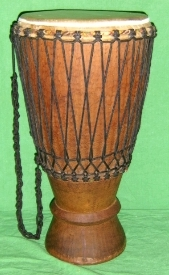
Bougarabou

A bougarabou (alternative spelling “Boucarabou”) is a set of drums commonly used in West Africa. The drums are single headed (cow skin), with an elongated goblet or roughly conical shape, usually placed on a single stand, and most commonly played in sets of three to four.

Until the last few decades the Bougarabou was played only one at a time, usually with one hand and a stick, but in the last generation or two (since the 1940s), possibly influenced from congueros in the western hemisphere, players play multiple drum setups. The drum is originally from the Jola (Jóola) people in the south of Senegal, the Casamance and the Gambia, the Jóola Buluf, the Jóola Fogny and the Jóola Kalunai. The Jola call a single drum Búgarabu (the ''a'' is pronounced like in about) or Búgarab. As -ab or -abu represents the article, also Búgaar, the indefinite denotation, is used synonymously in everyday life whereas the Plural Wúgaraw is nearly not used.

The drumset is played by a single drummer, unlike many African tribal situations. The drummer also wears a series of metal bracelets called Siwangas in Buluf and Fogny dialect that contribute to the sound. The audience and the dancers form a circle and clap, often with wooden chunks (size 25–30 cm) of palm peduncles, and sing with the music, but it is unique in that a single drummer traditionally provides the drumming. There are also some groups using a set of three or four drums and some more drums like djembe or other small Jola drums.

They are normally played with only the hands in a standing position. They have a full, deep, rich sound which can be heard for miles and is effective at all dynamic levels. They produce a kind of bass melody in the total rhythm. In other modern drumming situations, they are often used to back up djembes and tammas in a percussion group.
