= Bolokada Conde =

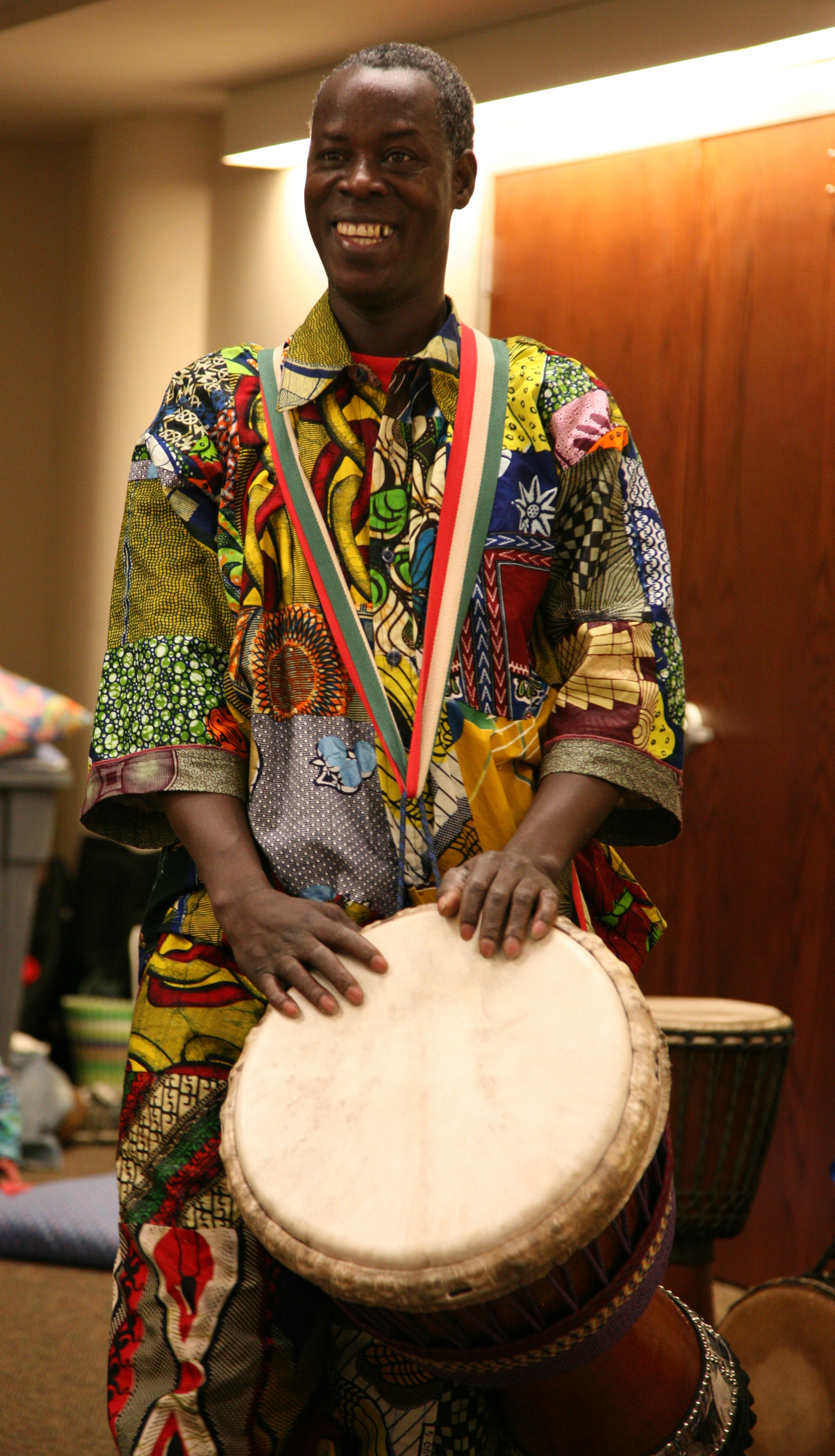
Conde at a performance in Urbana

Moussa "Bolokada" Conde is a master drummer from Kissidougou, Guinea, an expert of Malinke or Mandinka rhythms, and one of the world's foremost djembefolas. He joined the Les Percussions de Guinée to replace Noumoudy Keïta as their lead drummer. He has traveled and performed in major venues all over the world since 1996 and was featured in the IMAX movie PULSE: a Stomp Odyssey. Since 2004, he has been performing and teaching in the United States. He has conducted percussion workshops in many cities in the US and Europe. He has released two musical CD's, Morowaya and Sankaran. He stars in the DVD M'bemba Fakoli: A Musical Journey Through Guinea and has released the djembe instructional DVD M'bara. He is the subject of an upcoming documentary, Bolokada Conde—Malinke Village Djembefola. He was awarded immigrant status as an alien with extraordinary ability in the arts in 2007.

He was Artist Associate at the Robert E. Brown Center For World Music at the University of Illinois Urbana-Champaign, having previously been a visiting lecturer from 2008 to 2011. He is also the musical director and lead soloist of Ballet Waraba in North Carolina, Ballet Wassa-Wassa in Santa Cruz, California, California, and Les Percussion Malinke in the San Francisco Bay area.
