= Kourouba =

- Commune and village
- Location in Mali
- Coordinates: 12°0′31″N 8°17′29″W
- Country: Mali
- Region: Koulikoro Region
- Cercle: Kati Cercle

Area
  - Total: 245 km^{2} (95 sq mi)
- Elevation: 360 m (1,180 ft)

Population (2009 census)
  - Total: 8,248
  - Density: 33.7/km^{2} (87.2/sq mi)
- Time zone: UTC+0 (GMT)

Kourouba is a village and rural commune in the Cercle of Kati in the Koulikoro Region of south-western Mali. The commune covers an area of 245 km^{2} and includes 5 villages. In the 2009 census the commune had a population of 8,248. The village of Kourouba is on the right bank of the Sankarani River just upstream of where it joins the Niger River.
