= Doudou N'Diaye Rose =

Senegalese drummer, composer and bandleader (1930–2015)

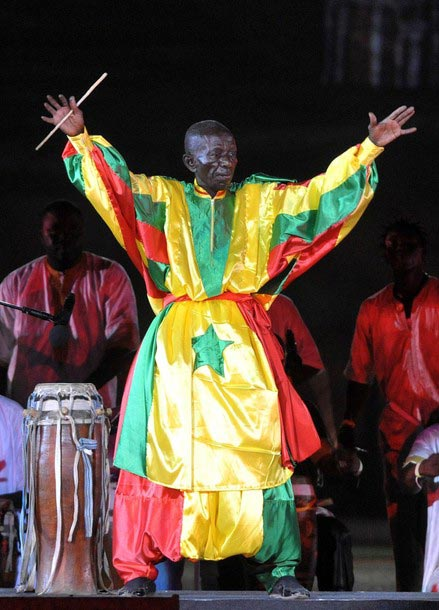
- Rose in 2014

Background information
- Born: Mamadou N'Diaye; 28 July 1930; Dakar, Senegal
- Died: 19 August 2015 (aged 85)
- Occupations: Musician; composer; bandleader
- Instrument: Sabar drums
- Years active: 1930s–2015
- Label: Real World
- Formerly of: Drummers of West Africa, Les Rosettes

Doudou N'Diaye Rose (Note: Pronounced /duːduː ɛnˈdʒaɪ roʊz/, Wolof: [d̺uːd̺uː ⁿd̺jɛj ɾoːz], DOO-doo en-JYE ROHZ) (born Mamadou N'Diaye; 28 July 1930 – 19 August 2015) was a Senegalese drummer, composer, and bandleader, and was the recognized modern master of Senegal's traditional drum, the sabar. He was the father of a musical dynasty that includes some of the most successful traditional musicians of contemporary West Africa. He was one of the first musicians to bring Senegalese traditional music to the attention of the world.

== Career ==
Rose was one of the most renowned African musicians of the 20th century. While he specialized in the sabar, he also played many other types of drum, such as the saourouba, assicot, bougarabou, meung meung, lambe, n'der, gorom babass, and khine. The child of a griot (West African bard caste) family, Ndiaye Rose began performing in the 1930s, but continued to make his living as a plumber for some time. Shortly before Senegalese independence, he performed with Josephine Baker, and became a favorite with Dakar audiences. In 1960, he became the first head of the Senegalese National Ballet, and in the 1970s, lead his Doudou N'Diaye Rose Orchestra. He also collaborated with Miles Davis and the Rolling Stones.

In 2006, he was declared a "living human treasure" by the UN cultural agency (UNESCO) for keeping traditional rhythms alive.

Among his final concerts were a festival in celebration of his 85th birthday and Deggi Daaj International, a festival dedicated to the sabar drum and dance culture, with whom he collaborated intimately since 2012.

=== Family of drummers ===
Born in Dakar, Senegal, into a family of Wolof royals, he was the founder and chief drum major of the Drummers of West Africa (all members of his family), with whom he also performed. He also led an all-female drum group called Les Rosettes, composed entirely of his own daughters and granddaughters.

== Styles ==
N'Diaye Rose was purported to have developed 500 new rhythms, featuring complex and ever-changing rhythmic structures which he conducted with his trademark vigorous style. He also invented new types of drum.

== Recorded work ==
His most well-known album, Djabote (Real World CDRW43), features 12 tracks recorded on the Isle of Gorée in March 1991. It was recorded in one week with his group of 50 drummers and the Julien Jouga's Choir, an 80-member, all-female choir.

N'Diaye Rose performed with Dizzy Gillespie, Alan Stivell (on the album Again), Miles Davis, the Rolling Stones, Peter Gabriel, Kodo and Bill Bruford. He is also featured in the remix of "The Warning" by Nine Inch Nails, which was on their album Year Zero Remixed.

== Films ==
- Djabote: Senegalese Drumming & Song From Master Drummer Doudou Ndiaye Rose (1993). Directed by Béatrice Soulé and Eric Millot. Montpelier, Vermont: Multicultural Media.
