= Yamadu Bani Dunbia =

Malian musician (1917–2002)

Yamadu Bani Dunbia (1917–2002) was a notable djembe master drummer from Bamako, Mali. Although recordings of his playing are scarce, he was well known across Bamako. He recorded his first songs at the age of 78.

== Biography ==
Dunbia was born in 1917 in west Mali and served in the French colonial army during the Second World War. After the war, he found himself in the Malian capital Bamako. After Malian independence in the 1960s, the celebration culture in Bamako boomed, and Dunbia became a well known performer, keeping his reputation until 2002 when he died.

His first recordings were made in 1995 when he was 78 years old. The recordings were made in a school yard in Bamako without rehearsals, notation or similar and in a single shot. Yet the music recorded is of significant importance to students of West African music.

== Discography ==
- 1995 - The Art of Jenbe Drumming: The Mali Tradition, Vol. 1
- 1998 - Jakite, Dunbia, Kuyate, and Samake: Bamakò Fòli: Jenbe Music From Bamako (Mali)
