= Famoudou Konaté =

Guinean musician

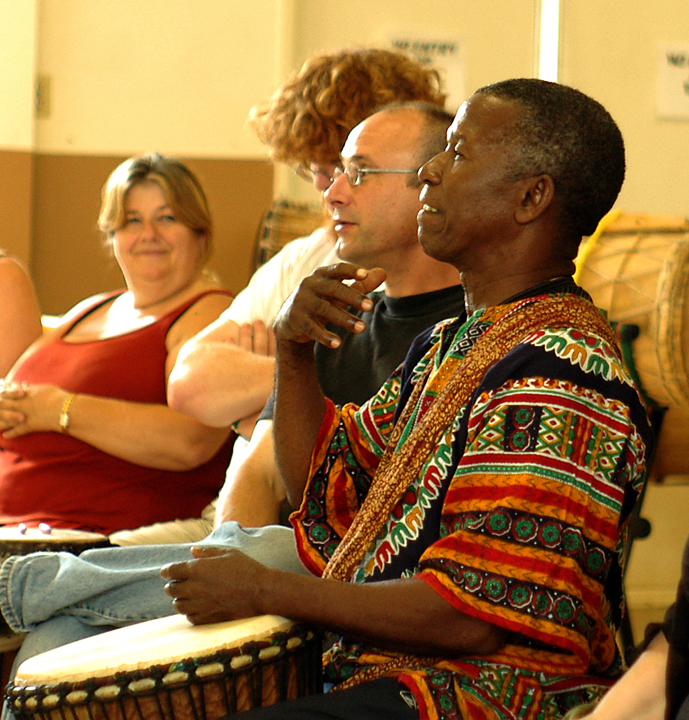
- Famadou Konaté teaching at a workshop
- Born: 1940 (age 85–86); Guinea

Famoudou Konaté is a Malinké master drummer from Guinea. Famoudou Konaté is a virtuoso of the djembe drum and its orchestra. One of only a handful of initiated masters of the Malinké drumming tradition, Famoudou is universally respected as one of the world's premiere djembe master drummers. He has dedicated his life to performing and preserving the music of his people, helping to elevate the djembe orchestra from its traditional roots to worldwide popularity.

Famoudou was born in 1940 near Sangbaralla, a village in the Hamana region of Upper Guinea, the Malinké heartland and the birthplace of the dundunba family of rhythms. A percussive prodigy, he was drumming in community festivals at the age of eight and was soon in demand as a djembefola across the region. From 1959 to 1985, Famoudou was the lead djembe soloist for Les Ballets Africains de la République de Guinée, touring the world and performing with astounding virtuosity. During this time, Famoudou himself created many of the musical arrangements now common in West African performance groups worldwide.

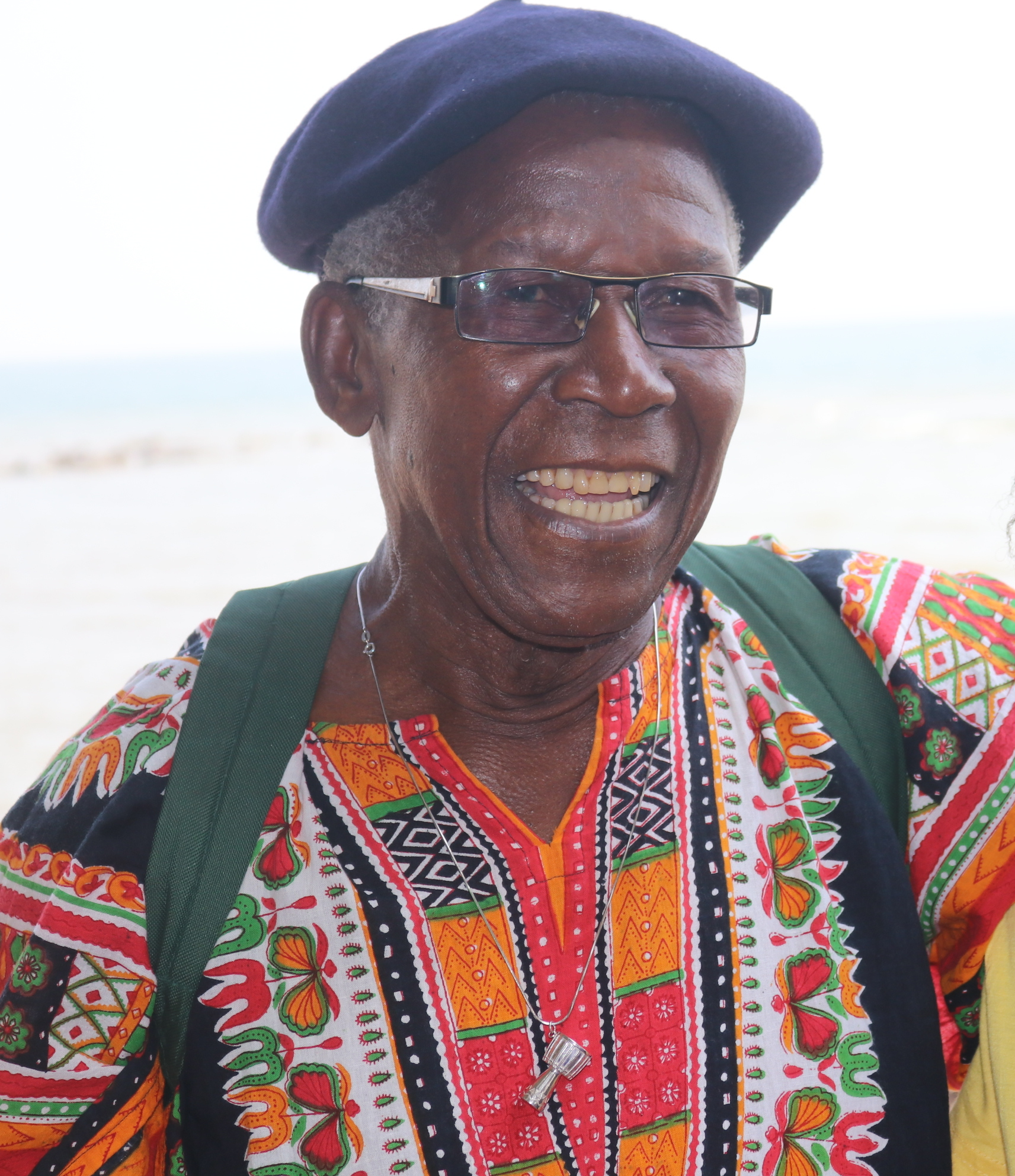

In 1986 and 1987, Konaté began his independent teaching career at the same time he was working still for the "Les Ballets Africains" in Conakry. Rále Dominique from Germany, Alain Brammer and Michel Weelen, both from France, were Konaté's first master students since 1986. They all went together in Famoudou's Konate birth village, Sangbaralla around Kouroussa in Upper Guinée and made a first recording, on tape, of his work and brought it back to Europe. On 1987 by Rainer Dörrer's hand, Johannes Beer went to Conakry. On 1988 Johannes Beer took Famoudou Konaté to Germany forming the "Ensemble Moderne". By the end of 1988, in Berlin, with the "Famoudou Konaté Ensemble", formed and managed by the legendary drumming duo from Berlin, "Djembe Tubabu" (Silvia Kronewald and Paul Engel). In the year 2000, Konaté was invited to the United States for the first time as an independent artist by the Chicago Djembe Project. Under the direction of Lillian Friedberg and Jim Banks, Konaté established himself on the North American scene with national tours from coast from 2000-2004. Today, Konaté teaches and performs annually throughout Europe, Japan, Israel, North America and West Africa, instilling a generation of non-African drummers with an extraordinary level of training. In 1996, he received an honorary professorship in Didactics of African Musical Practice from the University of the Arts Berlin. He has produced eight CDs, including his most recent release, Hamana Namun.

== Biography ==
Famoudou Konaté has published his biography in German "" and in French "".

The book is a Journey in the life of Famoudou : his childhood in his village and all its traditions; his life with Les Ballets Africains; his life after Les Ballets Africains and his thoughts about the West African society.

== Films ==
- Laurent Chevallier (director), Famoudou Konaté (himself) (1991). "Djembefola".
- Laurent Chevallier (director), Famoudou Konaté (himself) (1998). "Mögöbalu".

== Discography ==
- 1982 - Live in Stuttgart. (Bootleg recording).
- 1991 - Rhythmen Der Malinke. Museum Collection Berlin: CD 18.
- 1997 - Rhythms and Songs from Guinea. Lugert Verlag. (Companion CD to Rhythms and Songs from Guinea. ISBN 3-89760-150-8.)
- 1998 - Guinée: Percussions et Chants Malinké. Musique du Monde, Buda Musique.
- 2001 - Hamana Föli Kan. Buda Musique.
- 2003 - Guinée: Percussions et Chants Malinké Volume 2. Musique du Monde, Buda Musique.
- 2004 - Hamana Mandenkönö. TARIKUmusique.
- 2008 - Hamana Namun. TARIKUmusique.
