= 2025 Guinean constitutional referendum =

- 21 September 2025
- Do you approve of the draft of the new constitution?

Results
Choice	Votes	%
Yes	5,135,951	89.38%
No	610,376	10.62%
Valid votes	5,746,327	96.55%
Invalid or blank votes	205,480	3.45%
Total votes	5,951,807	100.00%
Registered voters/turnout	6,768,458	87.93%

A referendum on a new constitution was held in Guinea on 21 September 2025, to determine whether to replace the existing constitution introduced in 2020 with a new version that introduced a Senate and extended the term limits for the president. Voters approved the new constitution by 89% to 11%.

The referendum was conducted as part of a pledge by the military junta led by Mamady Doumbouya to restore civilian rule following the 2021 Guinean coup d'état.

== Background ==
From gaining independence from France in 1958 until 2010, Guinea was ruled by various successive autocracies, many of them military juntas. In 2008, the last of these regimes came to power following the death of long-time president Lansana Conté; a military junta led by Moussa Dadis Camara was established following a coup that took advantage of the power vacuum left by his death. Domestic and international opposition to Camara grew, and after a lethal crackdown on opposition protests in 2009, Camara was shot in the head in an assassination attempt and moved to Morocco for medical treatment. Under domestic and international (mainly American and French) pressure, the succeeding acting president, Sékouba Konaté organized elections for the following year.

In the 2010 Guinean presidential election, long-time opposition leader Alpha Condé became the first freely elected president in the country's history. Condé was re-elected in 2015 and 2020; the last election occurring due to constitutional changes implemented through a March 2020 referendrum.

Opposition leaders denied the legitimacy of the referendum results, fueling mass unrest in the country that had already been occurring in opposition to the constitutional amendments and continued after his reelection. The demonstrations were brutally repressed, resulting in 85 deaths. Compounded with an economic crisis caused by the COVID-19 pandemic and the associated supply chain crisis, Guinea became increasingly unstable.

On 5 September 2021, President Condé was captured by the country's armed forces in a coup d'état in Conakry. Special forces commander Mamady Doumbouya released a broadcast on state television announcing the dissolution of the constitution and government. On 1 October 2021, Doumbouya was sworn in as the interim president.

Doumbouya initially set 31 December 2024, as the deadline to launch a democratic transition. However, he missed the deadline, leading to protests and criticism from activists and the opposition. Under pressure, he promised in his New Year’s message that a decree for the constitutional referendum would be signed. Authorities have further added that all elections would be held this year, without committing to a particular date. The referendum will be watched by international observers, which have urged Doumbouya to follow through on his commitments and restore democratic rule.

The draft constitution was released in June 2025. Among its provisions were increasing the presidential term from five to seven years, with a limit of two terms, and creating a Senate, with a third of its members appointed by the president. Junta leader Doumbouya would also be allowed to run for election, which drew protests from the opposition.

== Campaign ==
Campaigning began on 31 August 2025 and closed on 18 September. The High Authority of Communication (HAC) issued limits on the selection of media outlets allowed to cover the referendum, restricting unrecognized entities that were in conflict with authorities. Private media outlets were also prohibited from engaging in interactive programs that discuss the referendum. The limits were subsequently relaxed on 1 September. The government deployed 45,000 members of the security forces and 1,000 light and armoured vehicles and combat helicopters nationwide to secure the vote.

== Results ==
The new constitution was approved by 89% of voters with a turnout of 88%.

Choice	Votes	%
For	5,135,951	89.38
Against	610,376	10.62
Total	5,746,327	100.00
Valid votes	5,746,327	96.55
Invalid/blank votes	205,480	3.45
Total votes	5,951,807	100.00
Registered voters/turnout	6,768,458	87.93
Source: MATD

== Reactions ==
Writer Tierno Monénembo said he would boycott the referendum, calling it a farce and a way for President Doumbouya of "legitimising his putsch and holding onto power for as long as possible". Opposition leader Cellou Dalein Diallo and former President Alpha Condé also called for a boycott of the vote.

Following the release of the results, Diallo said the results had been "prepared in advance" in order to make Doumbouya eligible to run in the upcoming presidential election. Faya Millimono, leader of the opposition Liberal Bloc, claimed ballots were pre-marked, while thousands of others were annulled. He also accused local chiefs of voting on behalf of regular voters under pressure to suppress "no" votes. In contrast, prime minister Bah Oury said the results represent a "mandate of trust" and pave the way towards a return to civilian rule.
