= National Front for the Defence of the Constitution =

Guinean pro-democracy coalition

The National Front for the Defence of the Constitution (French: Front National pour la Défense de la Constitution, FNDC) is a Guinean opposition coalition founded in 2019 initially in opposition to proposed amendments to the country's constitution by its then-President, Alpha Condé. It played a leading role in the organisation of the 2019–2020 Guinean protests, a series of demonstrations and civil unrest that occurred throughout the country. Following the 2021 coup d'état by the Guinean Armed Forces, the FNDC has been a prominent voice calling for the restoration of democratic rule in Guinea.

== History ==
=== Condé regime (2019-2021) ===
The FNDC was founded in April 2019 by Abdourahmane Sanoh as a coalition of civil society groups and opposition parties. Its initial focus was on organising a series of protests throughout Guinea in response to the country's president Alpha Condé proposing amendments to the constitution that would have allowed him to seek a third term in office. Shortly after the FNDC's founding, a key figure in the organisation, Foniké Menguè, was arrested at his home in Conakry, and was detained until August 2019 when he was released without charge.

In October 2019, nationwide protests were announced. Shortly afterwards, Sanoh, alongside the FNDC's operations manager Ibrahim Diallo and its strategic manager, Sékou Koundouno, were arrested on charges of disturbing public order and inciting civil disobedience. Marches continued to happen regardless on a weekly basis until the outbreak of coronavirus in Guinea in 2020. During the pandemic, Condé held a referendum on the proposed amendments, which led to the constitution being amended to reset presidential term limits, allowing Condé to run in the presidential election later that year. The FNDC rejected the outcome of the referendum and the concurrent parliamentary elections, calling for new elections to be held.

=== Coup d'état and military rule (2021-present) ===
In September 2021, Condé was deposed in a coup d'état by the Guinean military, who replaced the Condé government with the National Committee of Reconciliation and Development, a military junta. The FNDC became a prominent voice in calls for the restoration of democracy, first by Sanoh and from February 2022 by his successor as the FNDC national coordinator, Foniké Menguè.

In July 2022, the FNDC announced demonstrations scheduled to occur on 28 and 29 July, as well as 17 August, to denounce the lack of "credible dialogue" between the military junta, political parties, and civil society. This prompted the junta to officially ban the organisation on 8 August, accusing the FNDC of having "always been known for violence against people, the degradation and destruction of public and private property, and acts of incitement to hatred". The ban was signed by Mory Condé, the Minister of Territorial Administration and Decentralisation. Following a protest in Conakry in which five people were killed, Menguè was arrested on charges of "illegal protest and destruction of public and private buildings". He was released in May 2023 without charge. The FNDC continued to operate from underground.

In January 2023, the FNDC's outreach coordinator, Mamadou Billo Bah, was arrested on charges of "complicity in the destruction of public and private property, assault and battery". He was released in May 2023 alongside Menguè, similarly without being charged.

=== 2024 arrests of FNDC leadership ===
On 9 July 2024, Menguè, Bah and Mohamed Cissé were arrested from Menguè's home in Conakry, where they had been watching football. It was reported that dozens of soldiers had detained and assaulted the men before transporting them first to gendarmerie headquarters in Conakry, and onto a military camp on Kassa island. Earlier that morning, Menguè had called on his supporters to take part in a demonstration organised for 11 July by wearing red clothing, in protest of media shutdowns by the military regime, in addition to increases in the cost of living. As of 12 July, Guinean authorities had not publicly acknowledged the men's disappearance, or confirm their detention or the location of their detainment.

== Response ==
When the FNDC was dissolved in August 2022, the leader of the former formal opposition under Condé, Cellou Dalein Diallo, denounced it as "a blow to freedom, justice, democracy and peace". Human Rights Watch described the regime's rationale behind its decision to ban the FNDC as being "vague" and criticised the decision not to give the FNDC the opportunity to defend itself in front of an independent judicial body.

Following the disappearance of the FNDC's leadership in July 2024, Human Rights Watch accused the Guinean government of carrying out an enforced disappearance and called on authorities to immediately confirm their detention and location. Amnesty International called for the men's immediate releases. On July 22, 2024, after the disappearance of Foniké Menguè and Billo Bah, the families filed a complaint in Paris, France, via the lawyers of the National Front for the Defense of the Constitution (FNDC), against Mamadi Doumbouya.
