= Kourouma (name) =

Kourouma is both a given name and a surname. Notable people with the name include:

- Kourouma Fatoukouma (born 1986), French footballer
- Abdoulaye Kourouma, Guinean politician
- Ahmadou Kourouma (1927–2003), Ivorian novelist
- Dansa Kourouma (born 1980), Guinean politician
- Lamine Kourouma (born 1987), Ivorian footballer
- Lass Kourouma (born 2004), Guinean footballer
- Mamady "Wadaba" Kourouma, Guinean drummer
- Mohamed Kourouma (footballer, born 1987), Ivorian footballer
- Mohamed Kourouma (soccer), Canadian soccer player
- Moustapha Kourouma (born 1977), Burkinabé footballer
- Philippe Kourouma (1932–2009), Guinean bishop
- Salimatou Kourouma (born 1999), Malian basketball player
- Sékou Kourouma (1956–2020), Guinean politician
