= Mamady =

Mamady may refer to:

- Mamady, Republic of Bashkortostan, Russia

== People with the given name ==
- Mamady Condé (fl. 2004–2007), Guinean politician and diplomat
- Mamady Keïta (1950–2021), Guinean drummer
- Mamady Sidibé (born 1979), Malian footballer
- Mamady "Wadaba" Kourouma (born 1963), Guinean drummer
- Mamady Youla (born 1961), Prime Minister of Guinea (2015–2018)
