= FNDC =

FNDC may refer to:

- Far North District Council, New Zealand
- Foreign and National Defense Committee, Taiwan
- Frente Nacional para a Defesa da Cultura, Portugal, founded by Natália Correia
- National Front for the Defence of the Constitution (French: Front National pour la Défense de la Constitution), Guinea
