= Constitution of Guinea =

Legal document

Guinea has had four constitutions previous to the current one. Following the 2021 coup, the 2010 constitution was suspended by the ruling junta. The current constitution was approved on 21 September 2025.

== Background ==
A constitutional referendum was held on 28 September 1958 as part of a wider referendum across the French Union (and France itself) on whether to adopt the new French constitution; colonies voting to accept it would become part of the new French Community; if rejected, the territory would be granted independence. More than 95% of voters of French Guinea voted against the constitution, with a turnout of 85.5%, making it the only colony to vote no.

== History ==
Guinea became an independent nation on 2 October 1958. The first constitution was enacted immediately afterward and was written in some haste. A 15-person commission wrote a draft constitution in 10 days, which was approved by the new national assembly on 10 November 1958 after a mere two hours of debate. However, during the dictatorial reign of the first president, Ahmed Sékou Touré, it was routinely ignored or altered.

In 1982, bowing to both international and internal pressure, Guinea adopted a new constitution which included better protections for human rights. After Touré's death in 1984, the government was toppled by a military coup d'état. Another constitutional referendum, held on 23 December 1990, was approved by 98.7% of the voters, paving the way for a third constitution.

A 2001 referendum, which was boycotted by the opposition, amended this constitution, removing presidential term limits and lengthening the term from five years to seven. Critics accused then-President Lansana Conté of seeking to remain in power longer.

When Conté died in 2008, Captain Moussa Dadis Camara seized power in a coup d'état, but was shot in the head in December 2010. He left the country to receive medical care and recuperate. He later agreed not to come back, and Guinea returned to civilian rule.

The fourth constitution was approved by referendum on 19 April 2010 and formally adopted on 7 May.

After the 2021 coup d'état, the military announced that they had dissolved the constitution.

A draft constitution was released in June 2025 and was approved in a referendum held on 21 September 2025.
