= 2021 Guinean coup d'état =

Military overthrow of President Alpha Condé

- Part of the Coup Belt
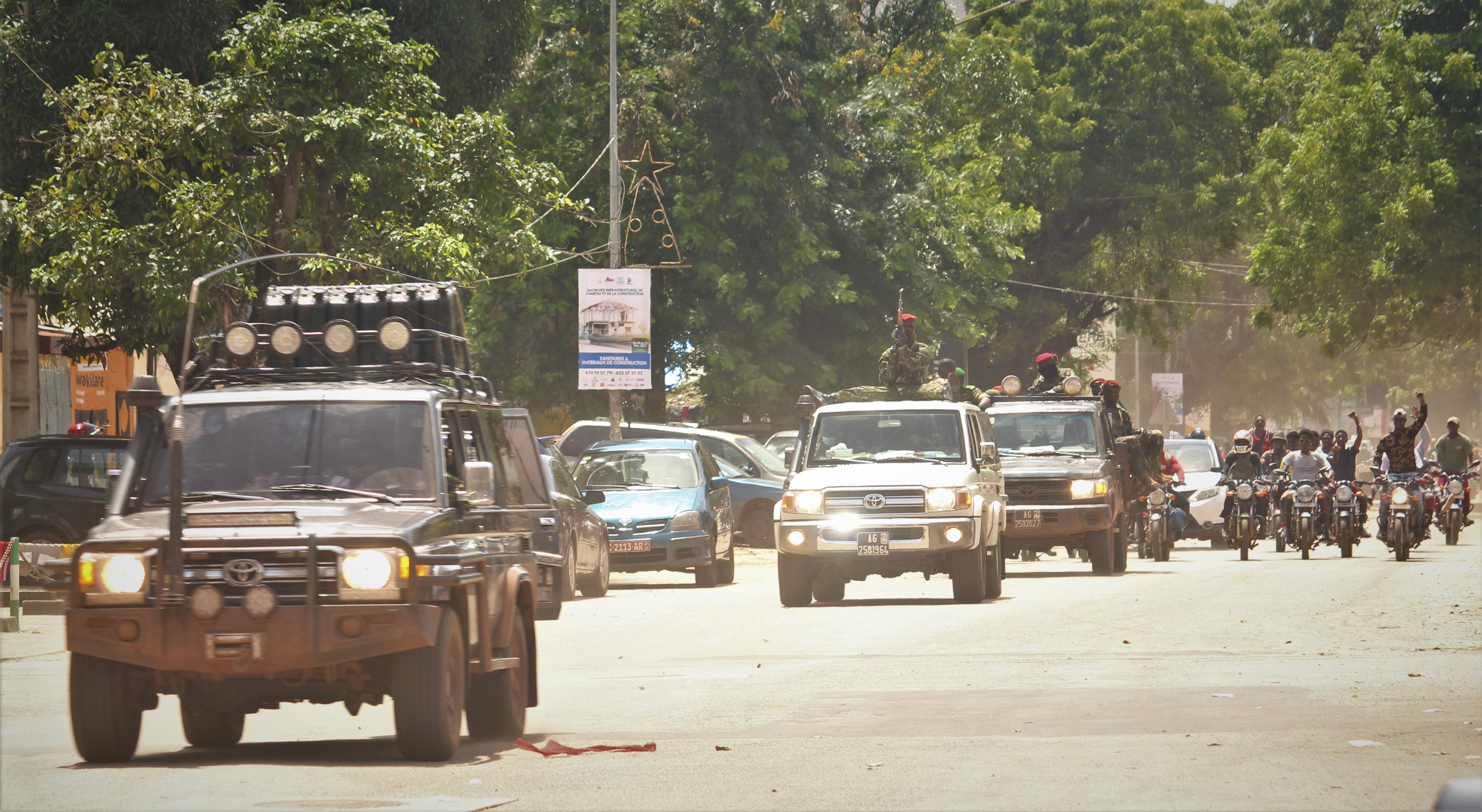
- Military parade in Kaloum, a day after the coup
Date	5 September 2021
Location	Conakry, Guinea 9°30′36″N 13°43′3″W
Result	Coup d'état successful: Alpha Condé deposed and detained; Constitution and government declared dissolved; Military junta established; Guinea suspended from African Union, La Francophonie and ECOWAS

Belligerents
Government of Guinea	National Committee of Reconciliation and Development (CRND): Republic of Guinea Armed Forces

Commanders and leaders
Alpha Condé	Mamady Doumbouya

On 5 September 2021, President of Guinea Alpha Condé was captured by the country's armed forces in a coup d'état after gunfire in the capital, Conakry. Special forces commander Mamady Doumbouya released a broadcast on state television announcing the dissolution of the constitution and government.

After several decades of authoritarian rule in Guinea, Condé was the country's first democratically elected leader. During his time in office, Guinea used its rich natural resources to improve the economy, but the bulk of the country's population has not felt its effects. In 2020, Condé changed the constitution by referendum to allow himself to secure a third term, a controversial change which spurred the 2019–2020 Guinean protests. During the last year of the second term and his third term, Condé cracked down on protests and on opposition candidates, some of whom died in prison, while the government struggled to contain price increases in basic commodities. In August 2021, in an attempt to balance the budget, Guinea announced tax hikes, slashed spending on the police and the military, and increased funding for the office of the President and National Assembly.

The coup began on the morning of 5 September, when the Republic of Guinea Armed Forces surrounded Sekhoutoureah Presidential Palace and cordoned off the wider government district. After a shootout with pro-government forces, the mutineers, who appeared to be led by Doumbouya, took Condé hostage, announced the dissolution of the government and its institutions, annulled the constitution, and sealed off the borders. While local politicians did not explicitly oppose or support the coup, the takeover was met with almost universal disapproval of foreign countries, which called for the coup to stop, for the prisoners to be released and for constitutional order to return.

On 1 October 2022, Doumbouya was sworn in as the interim president.

== Background ==
=== Political ===
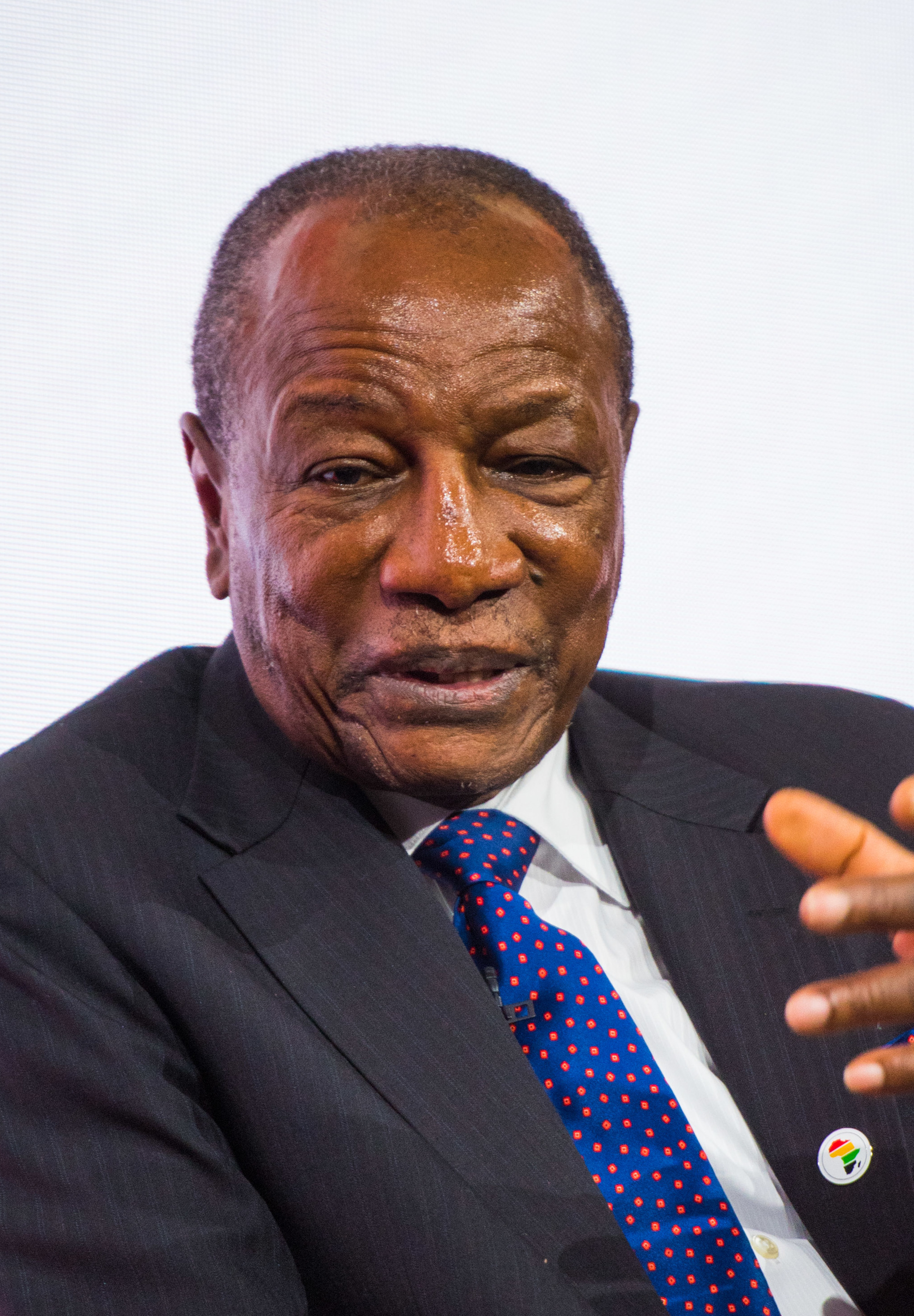
Alpha Condé in 2020

From the country's independence from France in 1958 until 2010, Guinea was ruled by autocratic regimes including "decades of corrupt rule". In 2008, a military coup was instigated shortly after the death of Lansana Conté. The military stepped down in 2010. Alpha Condé, the first president to be peacefully and democratically elected to the office of President of Guinea, started governing the country in 2010, and was re-elected in 2015. The country had a two-term presidential limit, but the 2020 constitutional referendum included a provision extending the length of terms and allowed Condé to "reset" his term limit and seek two more terms.

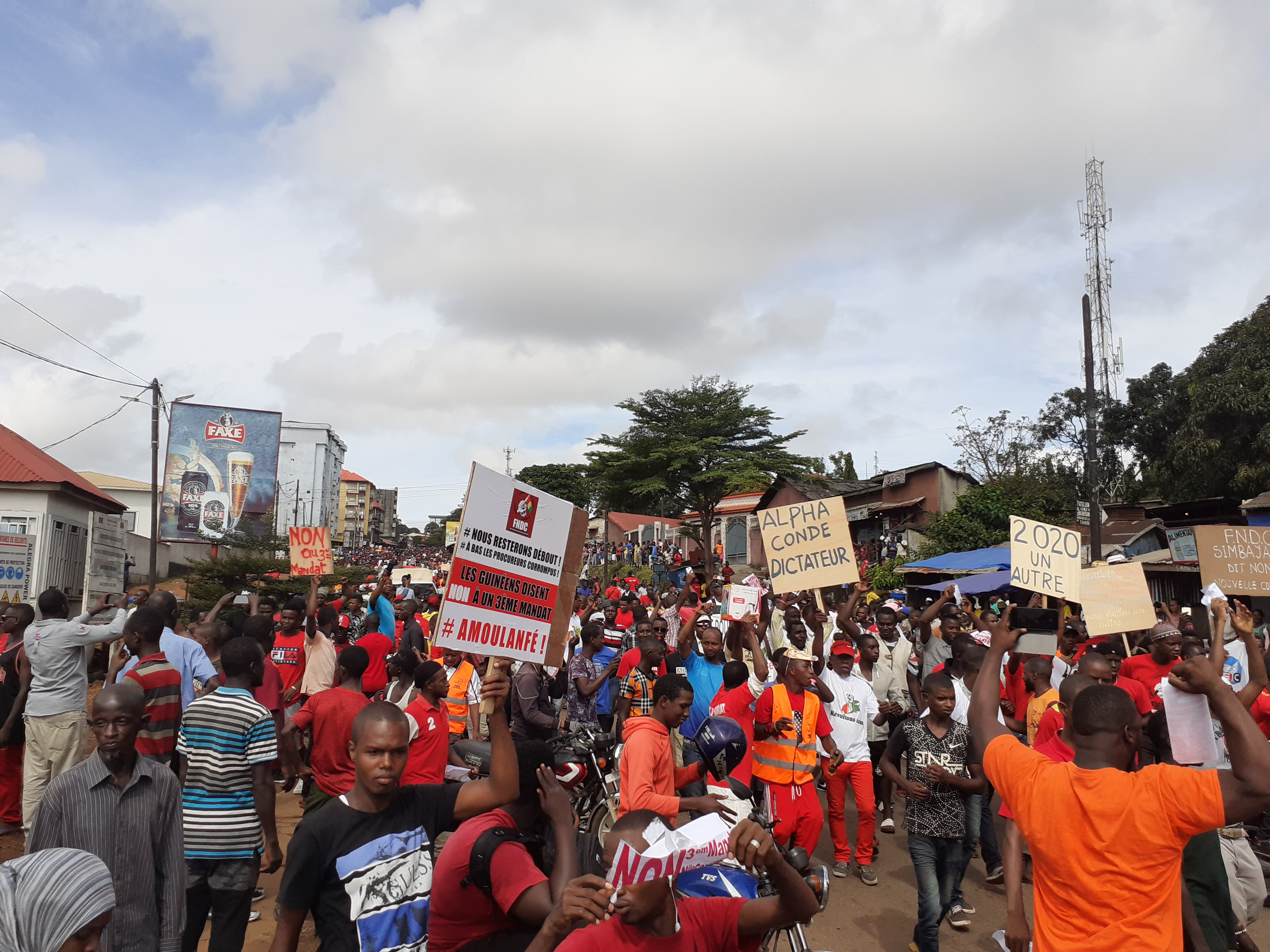
2019–2020 Guinean protests against the rule of Alpha Condé

The move had been controversial and sparked massive protests before and after the referendum, which were brutally repressed, causing more than thirty deaths between October 2019 and March 2020. After the constitutional amendment was approved, Condé won the 2020 presidential election and thus a third term in office. This was again followed by protests against the President, with opposition candidates accusing Condé of ballot stuffing. Protests continued throughout the year, and were harshly repressed by security forces, claiming at least 12 civilian lives, including two children in Conakry. France distanced itself from Condé following the 2020 election, leaving China, Egypt, Russia and Turkey foremost among the few powerful countries which continued to back the President. This happened as fellow West African and Central African countries have experienced democratic backsliding: Chad went through its own military takeover in April 2021, Mali had two such overthrows within a year (in August 2020 and May 2021), while Ivory Coast elected a president for a third term amid considerable controversy and allegations of fraud.

Starting from the presidential election, opposition politicians, who were contesting the legitimacy of Condé's mandate, were repressed. For example, Mamady Condé was arrested in January 2021, while Roger Bamba, the leader of Union of Democratic Forces of Guinea (UFDG), an opposition party, and Mamadou Oury Barry both died in prison. Prisons in the country, according to the Human Rights Watch, have very poor conditions.

=== Economic ===
During Condé's regime, infrastructure to extract Guinea's extensive mineral resources improved, particularly for bauxite with the state agreeing several multi-billion dollar projects with Chinese firms to tap new bauxite reserves and develop an alumina refinery. Guinea holds around a quarter of the world's bauxite deposits. Extraction of diamonds, iron ore and gold ore increased, following investments in rail infrastructure through deals with Société Minière de Boké (SMB), a private consortium of foreign firms operating in Guinea, with the government as 10% shareholder.

In 2019, the government agreed to the extension of a credit facility with the International Monetary Fund on the basis they would run a fiscal surplus, increase tax collection as a portion of GDP, reduce subsidies for petrol and electricity, increase investment in public infrastructure, reduce borrowing from the central bank and promote development of the private sector. Following recommendations at the United Nations' Third International Conference on Financing for Development in Addis Ababa in October 2019, Condé announced that 15% of mining revenue would be dedicated to the National Agency for the Financing of Local Communities to boost local government, as well as introducing measures to raise tax collection from 13% to 15% of GDP. This programme failed to bring immediate financial benefits for most citizens, with 60% of the labour force still working in the agricultural sector, and the communities around the mines being inadequately compensated for land, water and health losses connected with the mineral extraction.

The price of bread in Guinea hit new highs – crop failures in Russia and Canada caused a surge in prices on the global markets and Guinea was affected due to its reliance on wheat imports. As a result, in January 2021, the government agreed with the National Baker's Union to set the bread price at a higher level, but quickly backpedalled amid a public outcry at a 250-gram loaf increasing from 1500 to 2000 Guinean francs. This led to bread shortages in Nzérékoré because bakers refused to produce bread at the previous regulated prices, given higher costs of both wheat and sugar. After ten days of standoff between bakers and the prefecture government, the authorities granted permission to sell the bread at 4,000 francs. Similar increases were also reported elsewhere in the country. Public discontent ensued as a result.

The economy in 2021 came battered as the COVID-19 pandemic loomed on the country. A month before the putsch attempt took place, increases in petrol prices from 9,000 to 11,000 Guinean francs (US$1.12) per litre were announced. New taxes and tax hikes were approved in the weeks preceding the coup in an effort to balance the budget. The budget included provisions which increased funding of the National Assembly and presidential services but cut off some support for the security forces, such as the police and the military. A Western diplomat told The Daily Telegraph that the attack was provoked by the government trying to dismiss a senior member of the country's special forces.

== Members ==
- President: Mamadi Doumbouya

=== Vice President of Guinea ===
- Chief of Staff of the Guinean Army: Colonel Sidiba Koulibaly
- Senior Commander of the National Gendarmerie: Colonel Balla Samoura
- Minister Secretary General of the Presidency of the Republic: Amara Camara
- Spokesperson: Lieutenant Colonel Aminata Diallo
- Member: Colonel Mohamed Sylla, Aboubacar Sidiki Camara

== Coup ==
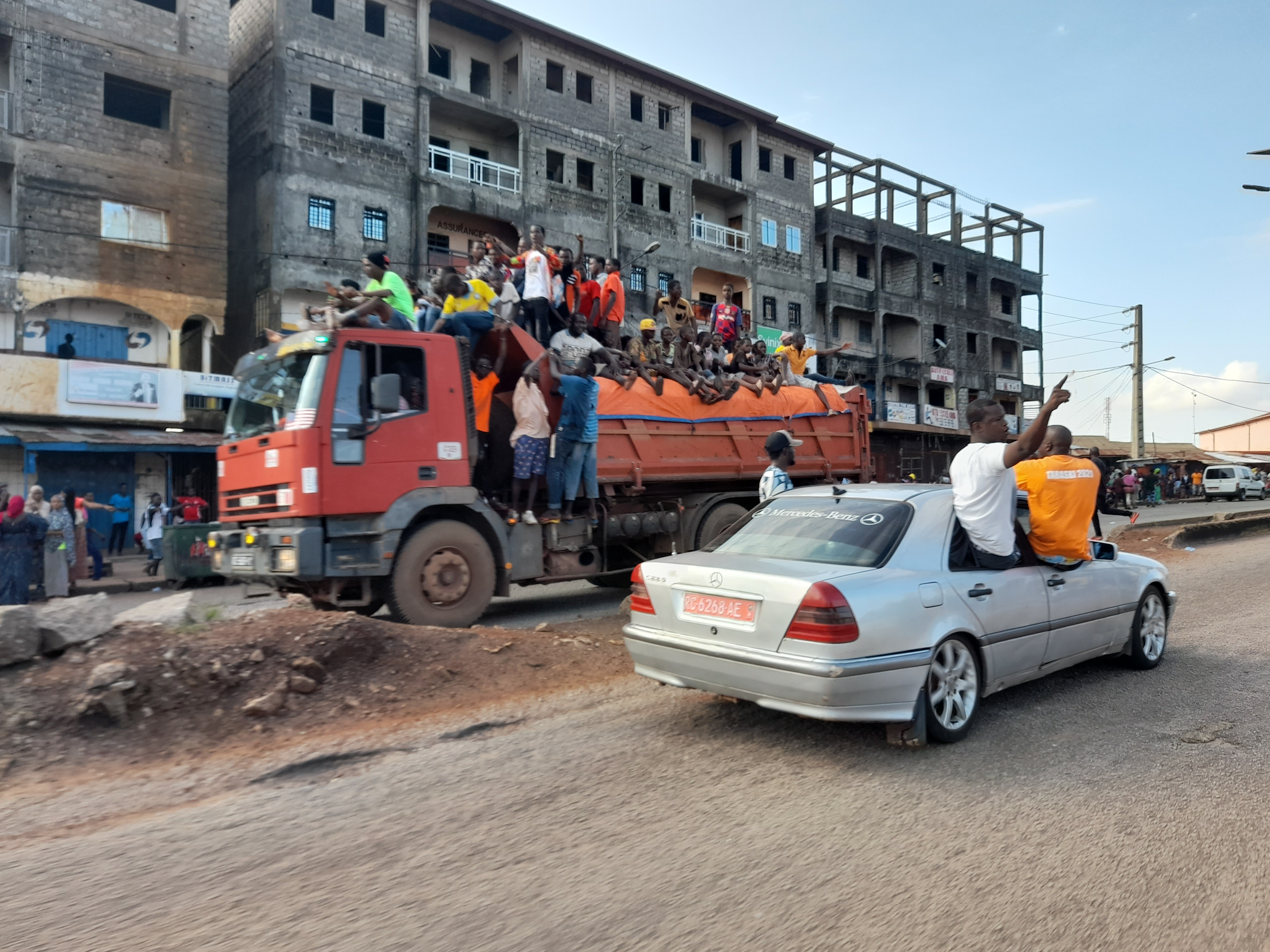
Guineans in support of the coup d'état on a truck, 5 September 2021

Guineans rallying in support of the coup d'état in Conakry, 5 September 2021

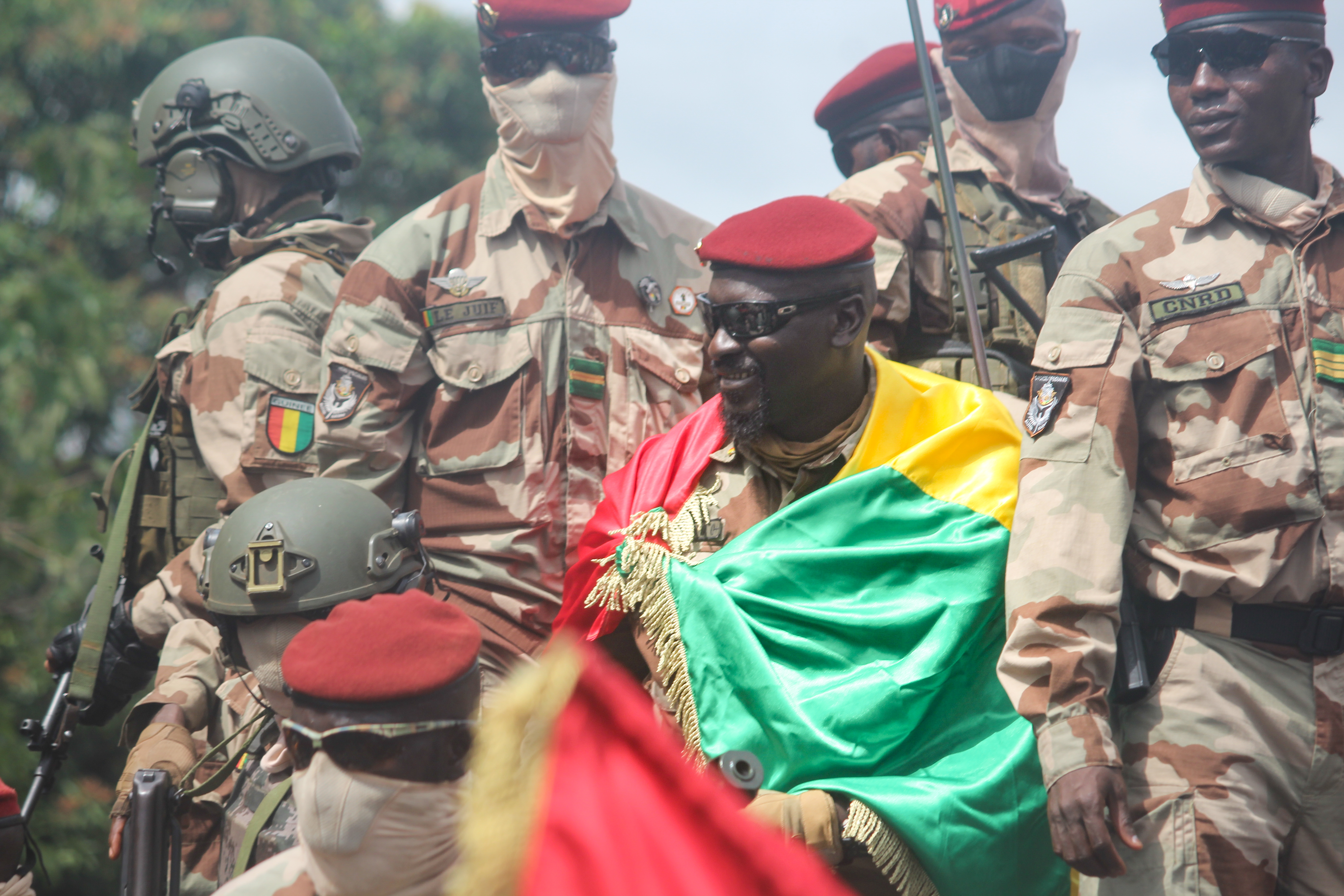
Junta leader Colonel Mamady Doumbouya on 2 October 2021

The gunfire started at around 08:00 local time (GMT) near the Presidential Palace. Witnesses reported that the soldiers had cut off the Kaloum neighbourhood, which hosts many government offices, and that the officers told people to stay home. While the Ministry of Defence said that the attack had been contained, photos of Condé being taken out of the building began to appear, and shortly afterwards, videos were posted of Condé being held by members of the Guinean military, which were verified by a senior European intelligence official. Condé is reportedly being held in military detention.

Colonel Mamady Doumbouya soon issued a broadcast on state television, Radio Télévision Guinéenne, in which he said the government and its institutions were dissolved, the constitution annulled, and Guinea's land and air borders shut (he later clarified that the country would be closed for at least a week). In the broadcast, he said that the National Committee of Reconciliation and Development (French: Comité national du rassemblement et du développement, CNRD) would steer the country for an 18-month transition period. They also urged for government workers to return to work on Monday, 6 September, and ordered the government to appear on a meeting at 11:00 on 6 September, lest they be considered rebels. Doumbouya, a former French legionnaire who returned to Guinea in 2018 to take command of the Groupement des forces spéciales (Special Forces Group), an elite unit of the Guinean armed forces, is reported to be the instigator of the coup attempt.

After President Condé was deposed, large crowds cheered the news of the overthrow in the capital and countryside. In the evening, the coup leaders announced a national curfew from 8 p.m. on 5 September "until further notice", while pledging to replace heads of the regions and prefectures with military commissioners and replacing ministers by general secretaries the following morning, which already started happening in the inland parts of the country. Despite the curfew, looting of shops occurred in the government district overnight. By evening on 5 September, the coup leaders declared control over all Conakry and the country's armed forces, and, according to Guinée Matin, the military fully controlled the state administration by 6 September and started to replace the civil administration with its military counterpart.

The next morning, the coup leaders assembled government ministers and ordered them not to leave the country and to hand over their official vehicles to the military, while promising consultations "to determine the general direction of the transition", announcing that a "unity government" would conduct such transition and pledging "not to make a witch-hunt" while in power (though the dates of transition were not given). They were afterwards detained and transported to the nearby military unit. Curfew was lifted in mining communities the same morning, but remained intact for the rest of the country, and most shops were still reported closed.

== Ramifications ==
After news came of the coup, aluminium prices on world markets climbed to a decade high, beating the record set in 2006 for Chinese markets amid bauxite supply concerns (Guinea is a major producer of bauxite, the main source of aluminium). On the London Metal Exchange, aluminium was traded for as much as US$2,782 per tonne.

A FIFA World Cup qualification match between Guinea and Morocco scheduled for 6 September was postponed due to the coup. The Morocco team were trapped in their hotel until they were able to evacuate to a local airport. François Kamano, a forward who transferred to Lokomotiv Moscow the previous month, also found himself unable to return to Moscow for training. The same thing happened to Neftchi midfielder Mamadou Kané.

== Reactions ==
=== Domestic ===
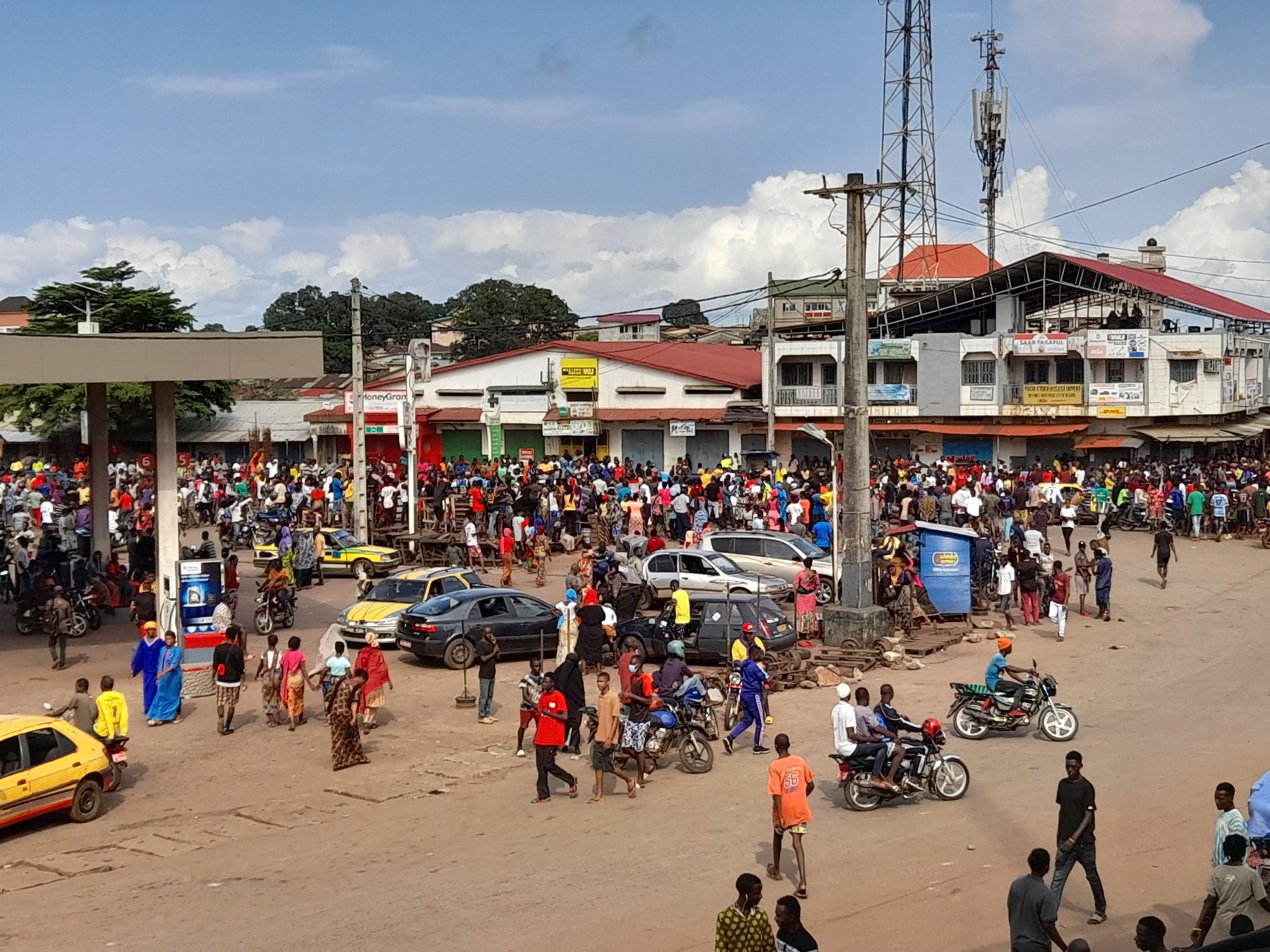
Scene of popular support in Conakry after the coup

Jacques Gbonimy, head of the opposition Union for the Progress of Guinea (UPG), stated in an interview to Guinée Matin that he was not surprised by the coup, maintaining that "all the conditions were met for the army to seize power" and blamed mismanagement of Condé's government for the overthrow. While he did not support nor oppose the putschists, he said that he was satisfied by the way the military handled the takeover. Saikou Yaya of the Union of Republican Forces (UFR), also in opposition during Condé's regime, has similarly argued that the government not listening to the opposition and the Guinean people led to the coup.

The Union syndicale des travailleurs de Guinée (USTG), the nation's federation of trade unions, said it was observing the situation "with great interest", acknowledged the coup and asked the military to uphold its promises and to help to "save the economical and social order" of Guinea. The Front National pour la Défense de la Constitution (FNDC), which initiated the protests against constitutional reform as proposed by Condé back in autumn 2019, also "took note of the declarations of a peaceful and inclusive transfer of power", but said it "waited for explanation on the methods".

=== International ===
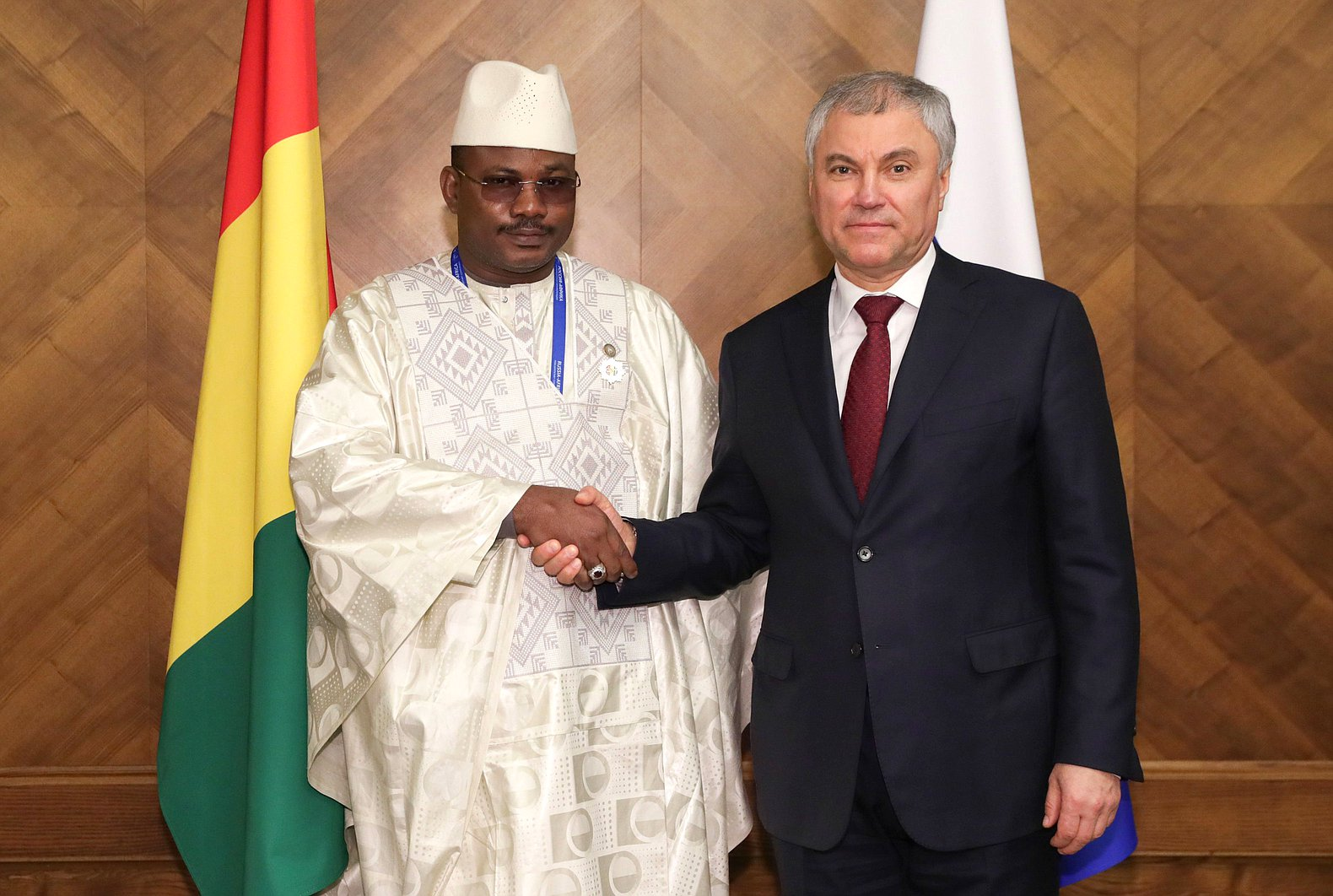
National Transition Council (CNT) president, Dansa Kourouma, with Vladimir Putin's close associate Vyacheslav Volodin in Moscow, Russia, 20 March 2023

- Belgium: Sophie Wilmès, the Minister of Foreign Affairs, condemned the military takeover, and called for the release of those detained and for return to the constitutional order and the rule of law.
- Burundi: President Évariste Ndayishimiye "in strongest terms condemn[ed]" the coup and called to return to constitutional order.
- China: Wang Wenbin, the spokesperson of Ministry of Foreign Affairs, condemned the coup, called for the immediate release of president Condé and urged restraint on both parties while asking to resolve the conflict through dialogue and consultation.
- France: The Ministry of Europe and Foreign Affairs condemned the coup and called for the immediate release of president Condé.
- The Gambia: A statement from the foreign minister Mamadou Tangara said that, aligning with the principles of the African Union and ECOWAS, it condemned the military takeover, called for return to constitutional order, urged release of civilian leaders and maintaining the rule of law.
- Germany: A spokesperson for the Federal Foreign Office "strongly condemned the attempt to seize power by armed violence" and sided with ECOWAS and the African Union in its demands to unconditionally release Condé and other detainees and to return to constitutional order.
- Guinea-Bissau: A spokesperson for the Ministry of Foreign Affairs said on 6 September that the government would have an official position the following day, and urged not to make hot-tempered decisions until concrete information appears concerning the coup.
- Liberia: President George Weah called for the immediate release of Alpha Condé and called on Guinea's new military leaders to "adhere to the tenets of civilian rule and democracy".
- Mexico: The Secretariat of Foreign Affairs condemned the coup in the strongest terms and called for Condé's immediate release.
- Nigeria: The Ministry of Foreign Affairs stated that Guinea's "apparent coup d'état" violated ECOWAS rules, and urged the country to return to the constitutional order.
- Spain: The Spanish Government condemned the violence, called for a return to the constitutional order and of the democratic institutions of Guinea, and associated itself to ECOWAS in calling for the liberation of the president and return of the soldiers to their barracks.
- Turkey: The Foreign Ministry condemned the coup and called for the president to be released as well as the restoration of its constitution.
- United States: The U.S. State Department immediately condemned the coup, warned against "violence and any extra-constitutional measures," and noted they "could limit the ability of the United States and Guinea's other international partners to support the country ..." – calling for "national dialogue to address concerns sustainably and transparently to enable a peaceful and democratic way forward ..."

==== Organisations ====
International organisations, including the African Union, the Economic Community of West African States (ECOWAS), the European Union (EU) and the United Nations (UN), joined in denouncing the attempt and calling for the release of president Condé.

ECOWAS immediately suspended Guinea's membership, called for the President's unconditional release, and sent envoys to Conakry to attempt a "constitutional" resolution to the situation. On 17 September 2021, a group from ECOWAS – led by the bloc's chair, Ghana's President Nana Akufo-Addo, visited Conakry to meet with junta leaders.

On 10 September 2021, the African Union suspended Guinea's membership in response to the coup and imposed sanctions which were lifted in 2026 following the election of Doumbouya as civilian president in the 2025 Guinean presidential election.

== See also ==
- 1984 Guinean coup d'état
- 2008 Guinean coup d'état
- 2019–2020 Guinean protests
- 2010 Nigerien coup d'état
- 2020 Malian coup d'état
- 2023 Nigerien coup d'état, in which the new junta of Guinea under Doumbouya supported the revolting troops.
