= 1998 Guinean presidential election =

- 14 December 1998
- Registered: 3,719,197
- Turnout: 71.42% (▼7.04pp)
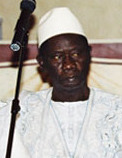

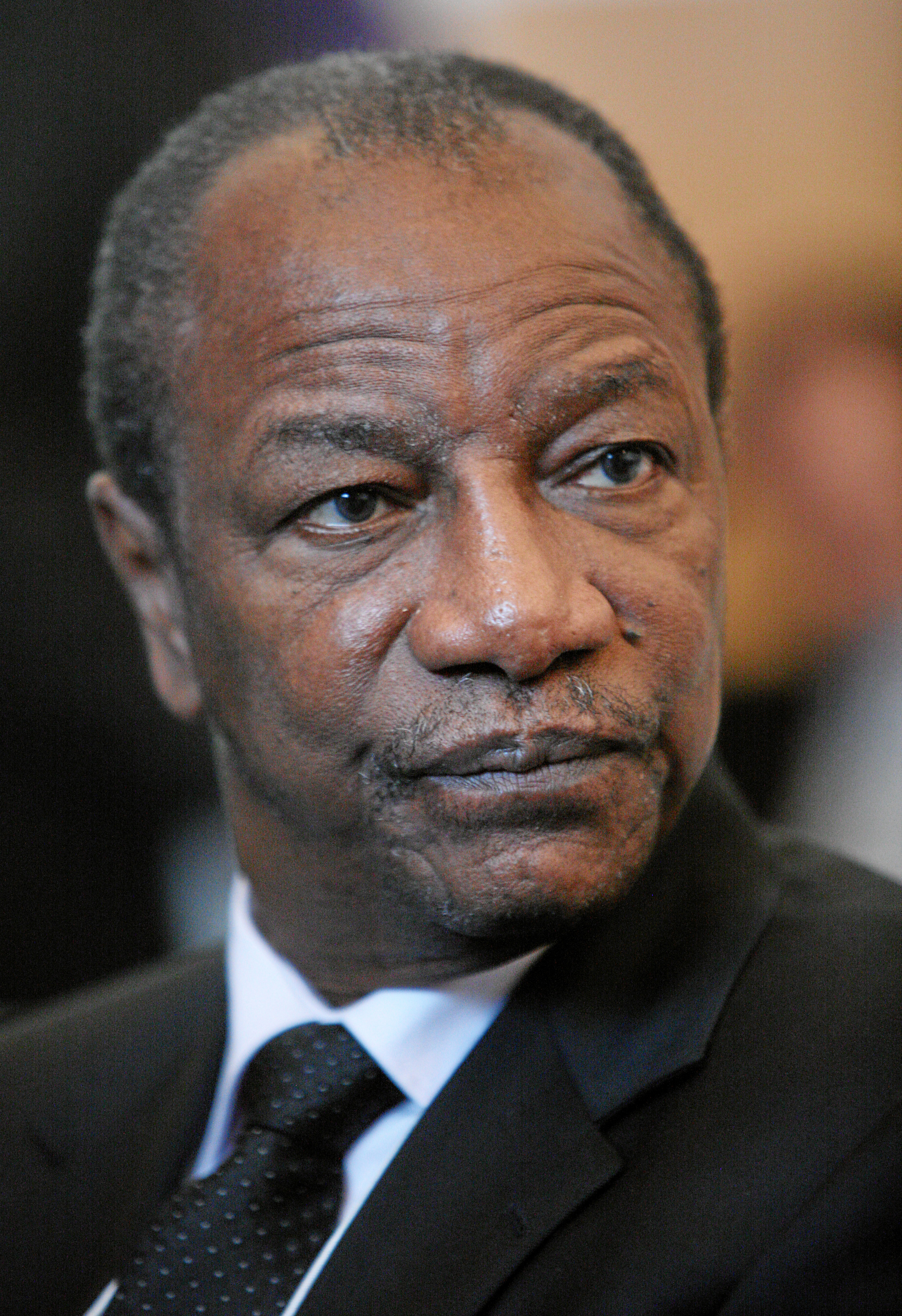
| Nominee | Lansana Conté | Mamadou Boye Bah | Alpha Condé |
| Party | PUP | UPR | RPG |
| Popular vote | 1,455,007 | 638,563 | 429,934 |
| Percentage | 56.11% | 24.63% | 16.58% |
President before election
Lansana Conté
PUP
Elected President
Lansana Conté
PUP

Presidential elections were held in Guinea on 14 December 1998. The result was a victory for incumbent President Lansana Conté of the Unity and Progress Party, who received 56.1% of the vote. Voter turnout was 71.4%.

== Results ==
| Candidate | Party | Votes | % |
|---|---|---|---|
| Lansana Conté | Unity and Progress Party | 1,455,007 | 56.11 |
| Mamadou Boye Bah | Union for Progress and Renewal | 638,563 | 24.63 |
| Alpha Condé | Rally of the Guinean People | 429,934 | 16.58 |
| Jean Marie Doré | Union for the Progress of Guinea | 44,746 | 1.73 |
| Charles Pascal Tolno | Guinean Peoples' Party | 24,771 | 0.96 |
| Total | | 2,593,021 | 100.00 |
| Valid votes | | 2,593,021 | 97.62 |
| Invalid/blank votes | | 63,092 | 2.38 |
| Total votes | | 2,656,113 | 100.00 |
| Registered voters/turnout | | 3,719,197 | 71.42 |
Source: African Elections Database
