= 2019–2020 Guinean protests =

Protests against President Alpha Condé

2019–2020 Guinean protests (FNDC Movement)
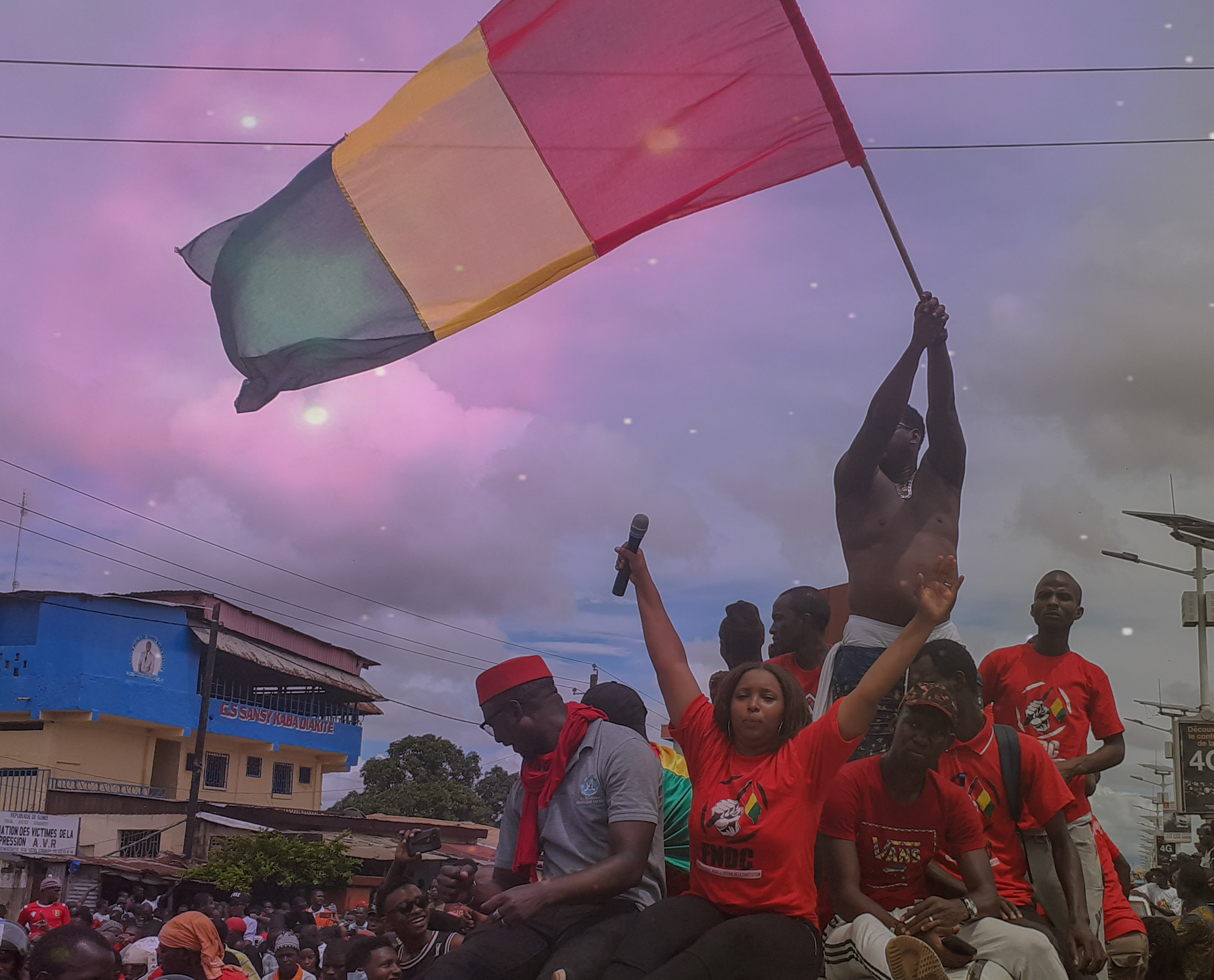
- Protestors in Conakry on 24 October 2019
- Date: 14 October 2019 – 31 October 2020
- Location: Guinea
- Caused by: Constitutional referendum; 2020 Guinean presidential election; Violence by security forces
- Goals: Resignation of President Alpha Conde; Free results of general elections
- Methods: Demonstrations, riots, general strike, ghost towns
- Result: Protests suppressed by force; 2021 Guinean coup d'état

Deaths and injuries
- Deaths: 79–85+
- Injuries: 144+

The 2019–2020 Guinean protests, or the Front National pour la Défense de la Constitution (FNDC), were a series of violent protests and mass civil unrest around Guinea against the rule of Alpha Condé that first broke out on 14 October 2019 against constitutional changes. More than 800 were killed in violent clashes and political scenes yet ethnic clashes and this spawned even further rhetoric, while the protesters still resisted despite the harsh repression. After the 2020 Guinean presidential election, widespread unrest took place, leading to the deaths of 27 protesters.

== Background ==
In Guinea, political dissent has been silenced since the 2007 Guinean general strike, when 100 were killed. Hundreds of people have been arrested in separate cases of violence, such as the 2009 Guinea protests, 2013 Guinea clashes and many more. After a wave of unprecedented demonstrations against the results of the 2015 Guinean presidential election, 70 protesters were killed and more than 400 were arrested in six months of protests. In 2019, protesters had had enough with the government and a new bill allowing constitutional referendums and changes, so protesters started to rally.

=== Slogans ===
The demonstrators are demanding in the first place the non-candidacy of Alpha Condé for a third term and the non-modification or the new constitution in Guinea. Crazy, Crazy, crazy, Go Away, Alpha Condé, No New Constitution Until You're Gone! were popular slogans during the popular movement and widespread demonstrations.

=== Protests leading up to Constitutional Referendum ===
Protests against the referendum in the buildup to polling day led to the deaths of over 32 people between October 2019 to March 2020, with regular protests taking place in Conakry and other cities including Labé, Mamou, Boké or Nzérékoré.

During the protests, several government offices, schools and police stations were attacked with the aim of destroying voting materials. Some of the scenes that took place during that period included attackers entering a police station in Mamou and tearing up voter lists and ransacking boxes of electoral cards; two schools that were planned to be used as polling stations were set on fire; several administrative buildings in the north and southern part of the country were also set on fire; and in Labé, tyres were burnt in the streets and road barricades set up.

On September 18, 2021, four figures from the National Front for the Defense of the Constitution (FNDC) returned to Guinea. These fierce opponents of constitutional reform and Alpha Condé's candidacy for a third term had fled abroad. Almost two weeks after the coup, Ibrahima Diallo, Sékou Koundouno, rapper Djani Alfa and blogger Fodé Sanikayi Kouyaté were greeted as heroes by a huge crowd in Conakry.

== Protests ==
Between 14 and 15 October, a wave of protests struck Conakry after president Alpha Condé changed the constitution. Five were killed in various protests. The protests spread to nearly a dozen cities by 16 October. Mass political unrest spiralled out of control when abuses against the Fulani tribe took place. Thousands of protesters threw stones at police and three were killed between 18 and 19 October. The unrest spread to Nzérékoré, the country's third-largest city. Police fired live ammunition to disperse protesters. Anti-government chants demanded an end to the government.

Tanks and soldiers stormed cities as nationwide strikes erupted. Between 20 and 28 October, various acts of civil disobedience took place and hundreds sang and chanted slogans against president Alpha Condé. Violence by police against tribes went on for four days. Anti-military protests and pro-democracy protests rose after the street protests erupted. Between 14 and 17 November, a wave of protests struck major cities nationwide. At least 100 were killed in the unrest after mid-October. Thousands rallied 19–24 November, demanding an end to corruption, shortages and poverty. Riots intimidated international donors and the media drew attention to the protests.

Acts of violence rampaged through cities and poor suburbs in towns across Guinea as anti-government rallies spiralled out of control. Tens of thousands of opposition supporters and workers took to the streets, demanding better wages and pay-checks to resume. Economic turmoil and political crisis were among of the causes of the civil unrest. A conflict between protesters and the police occurred when blockades were broken down by the army, and security forces opened fire on protesters, killing at least seven in December alone.

Mass rallies occurred in Guinea on 16–17 January. Two were killed in the ensuing crackdown. On 30–31 January, mass protests killed four when thousands threw stones and chanted anti-government slogans against the prime minister. Police brutality complaints were filed in court. The 2020 Guinean constitutional referendum was met with five days of unprecedented demonstrations and intense clashes with the military, who fired live ammunition and killed at least thirteen. After the results were pulled out, opposition protesters took to the streets to demand an end to corruption scandals and the government and the resignation of president Alpha Condé. Between April–July 2020, strikes for better electricity gripped areas across the country, killing seven as electric supplies were cut off.

After a nationwide lockdown banned protest actions and gatherings, hundreds defied the ban and took to the streets as a continuation of the protest movement. One person was injured as teargas was used to disperse protesters. Riot police stormed compounds and neighbourhoods on 20–31 July.

After a break, nationwide rallies led by the opposition took place. Ten were killed in the pre-election protests demanding that president Alpha Condé should resign and not run for a third term in office in the 2020 Guinean presidential election.

A series of nationwide anti-government strikes intensified after the announcement of the results of the 2020 Guinean presidential election. Protesters threw stones and pelted eggs, demanding democratic reforms and justice for those who had died due to political unrest, free elections and a new government led by the opposition. Four were killed by violence from military forces against strikers and protesters. After a week-long series of protests, protesters were calm after 23 were killed by police forces who attacked protesters and journalists calling on freedom and fair elections.

== Gallery ==
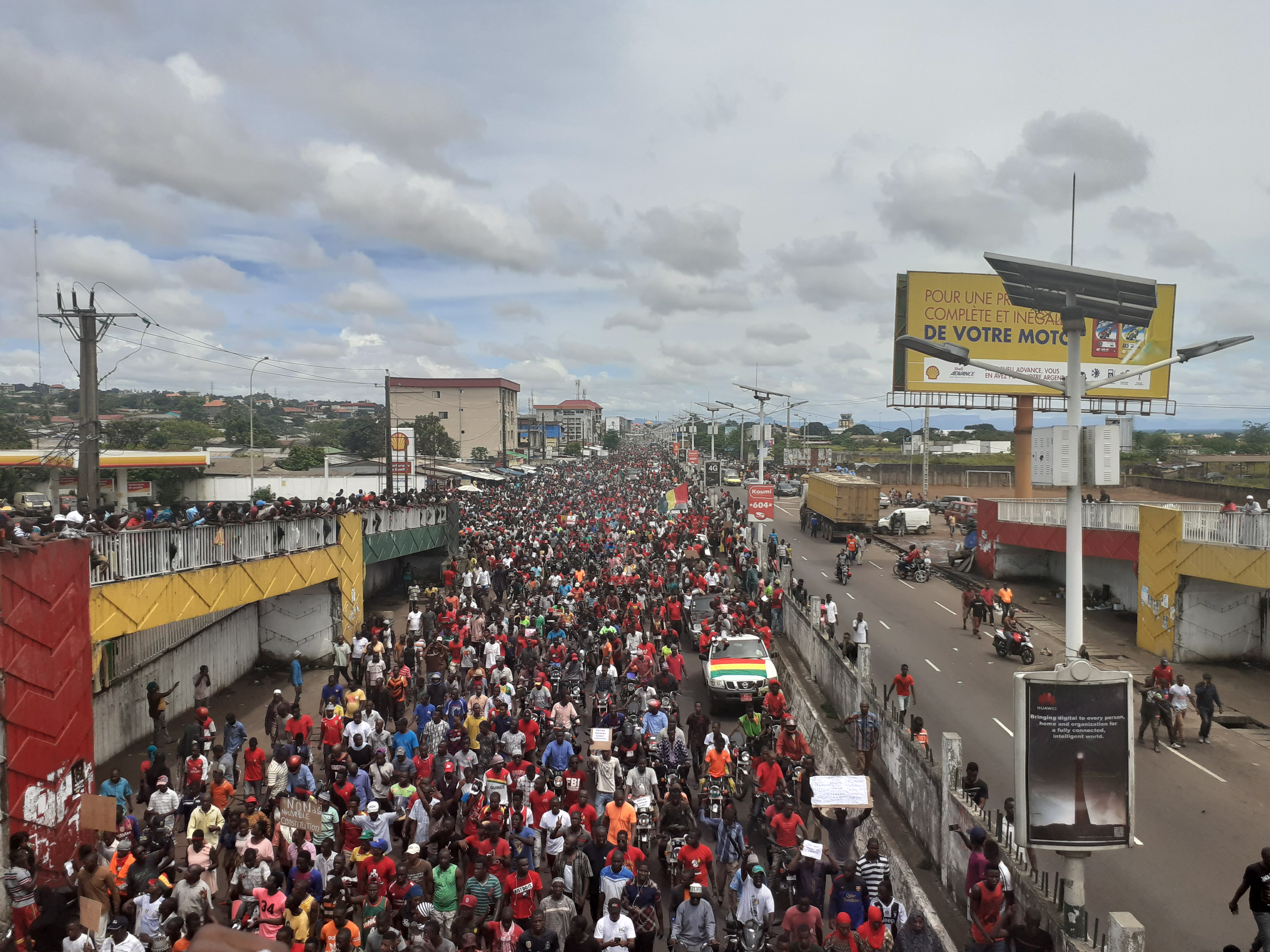
24 October 2019 protests in Conakry

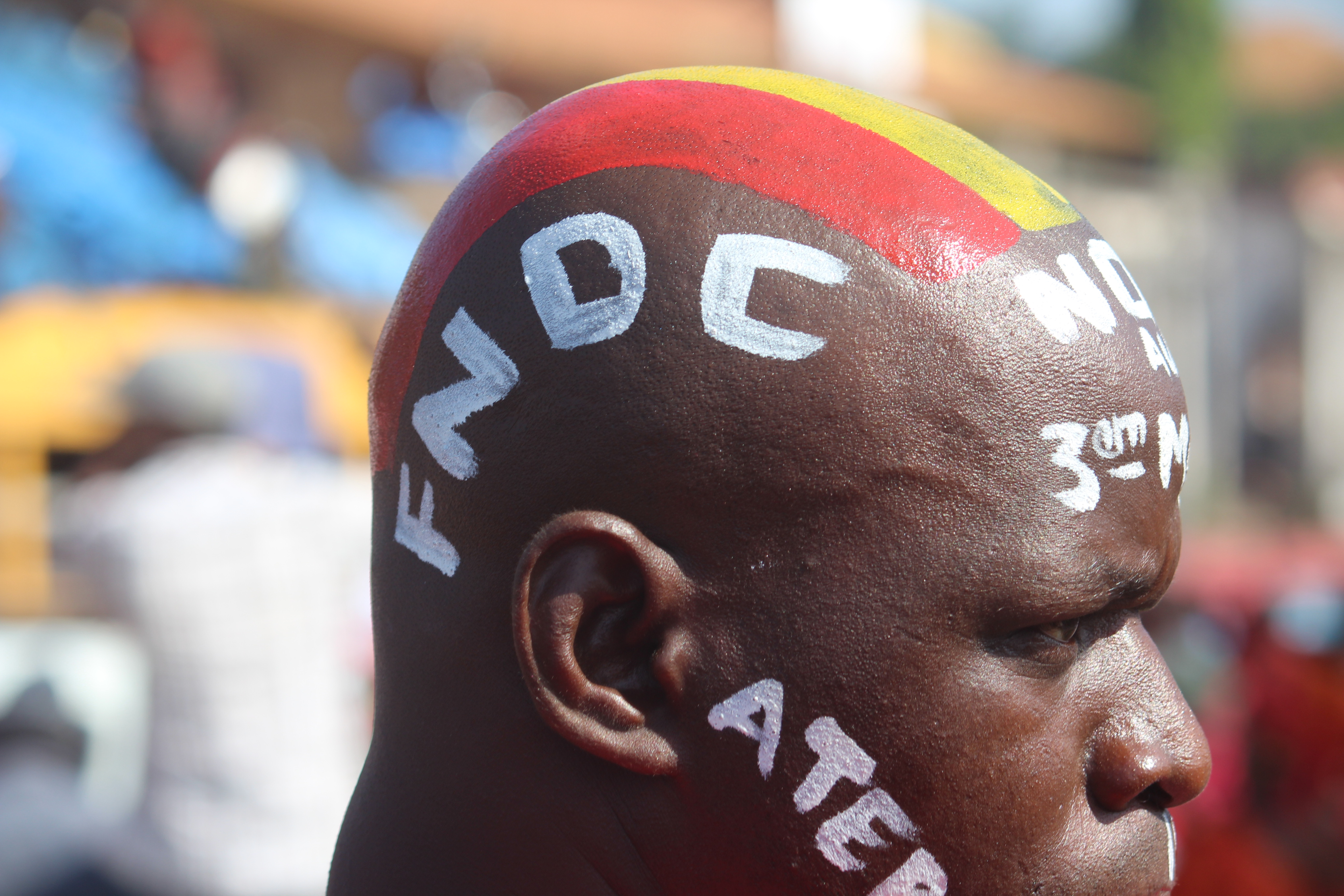
Protester

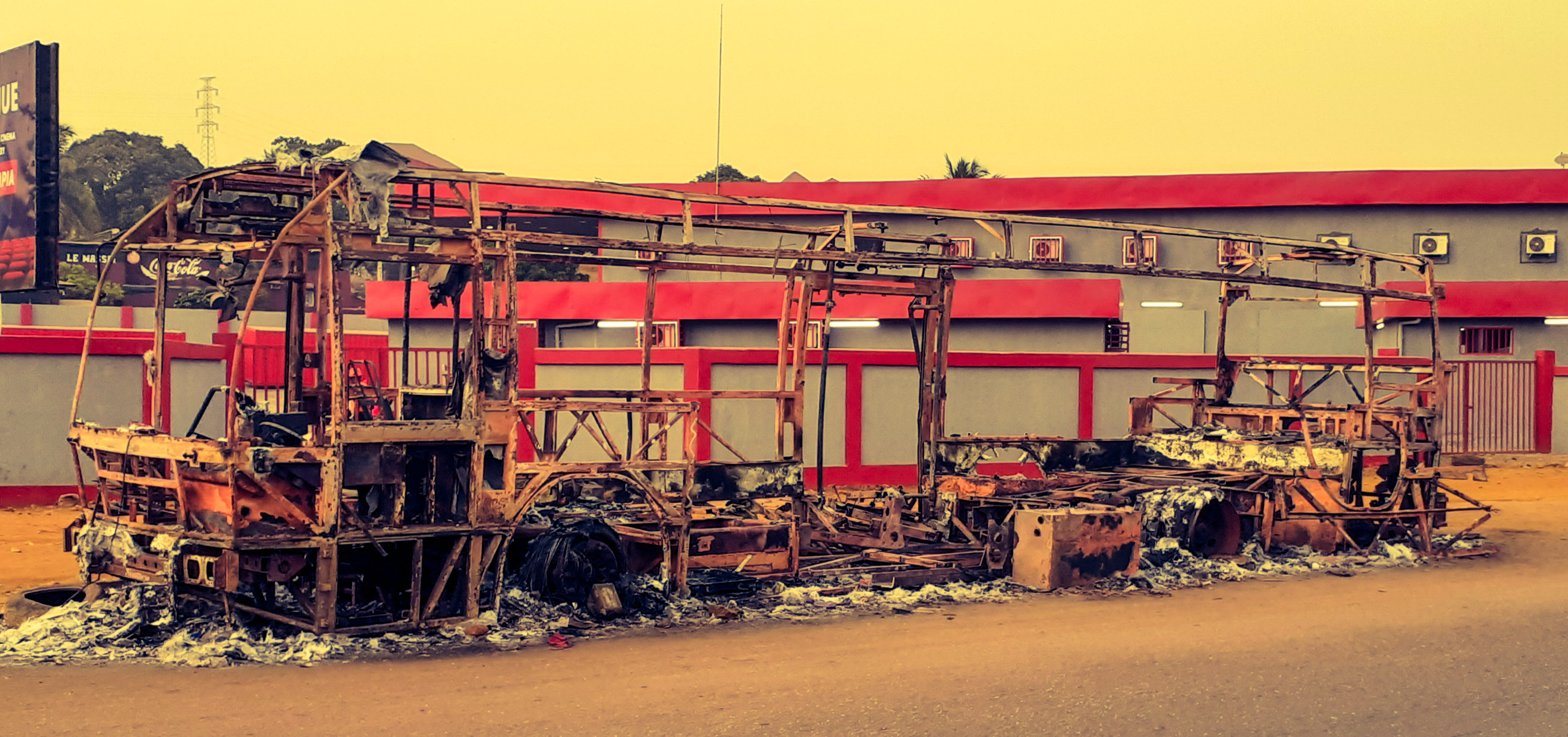
Bus looted during rioting

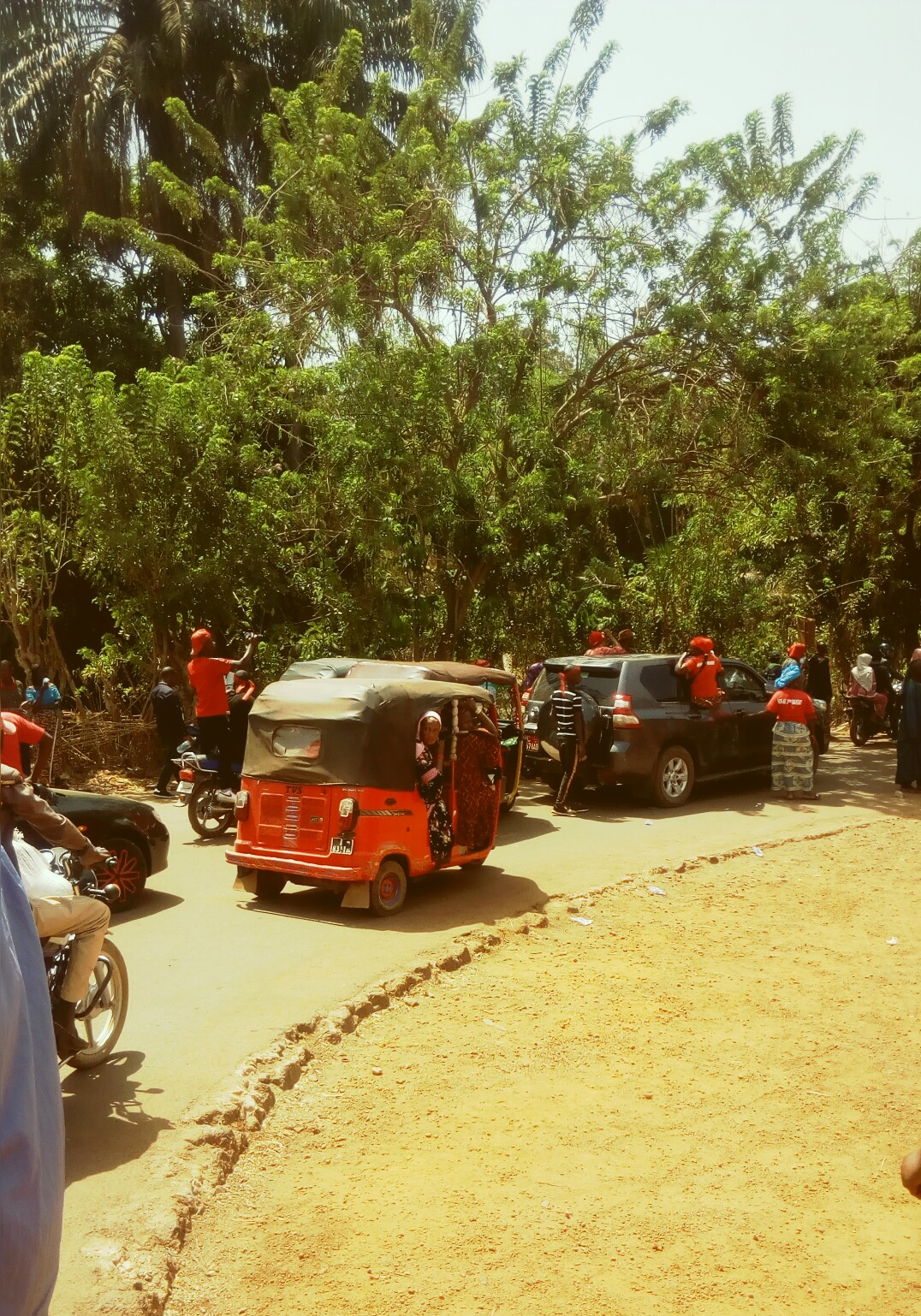
Tuk-Tuk surrounded by demonstrators

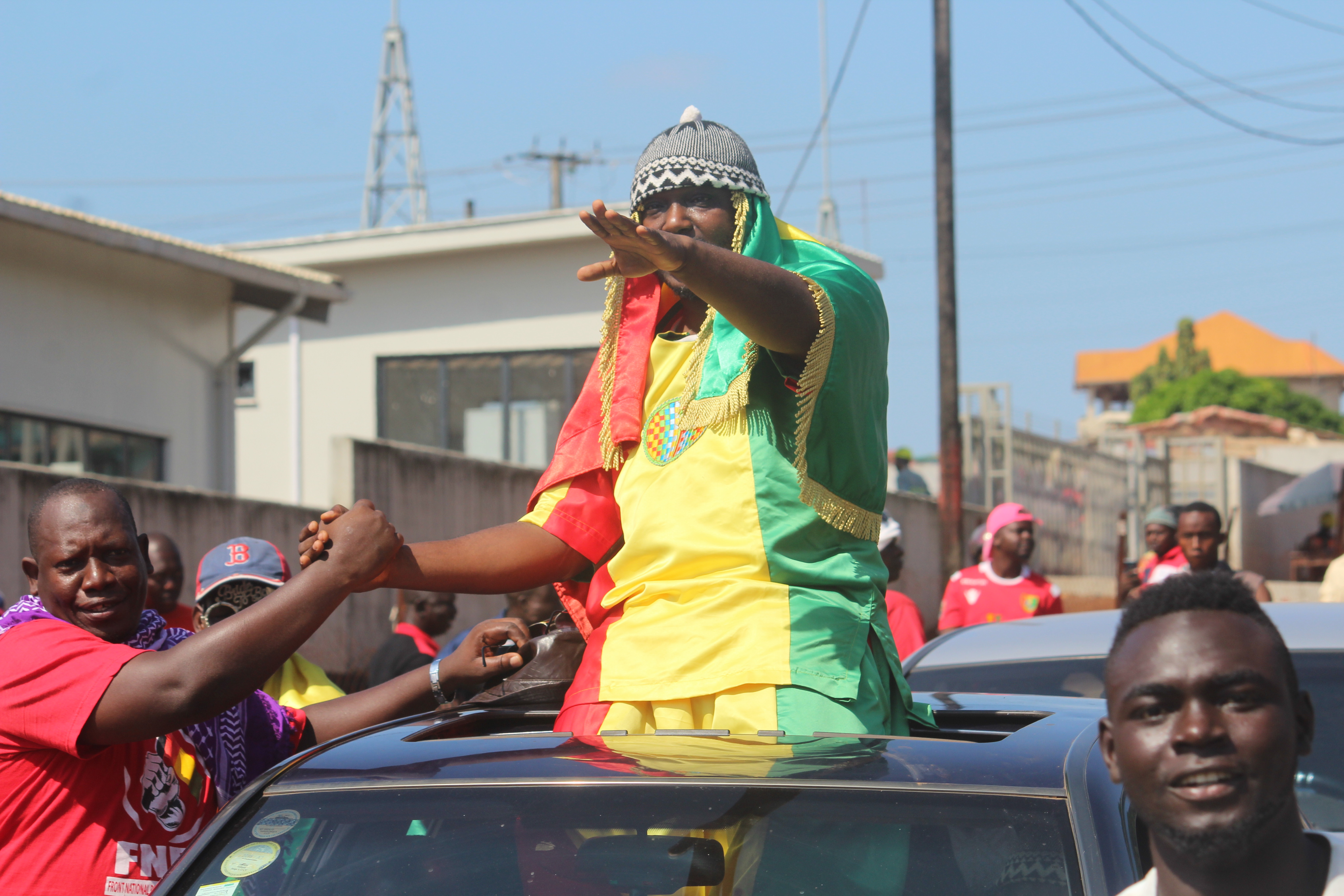
A protester draped in Guinea flag

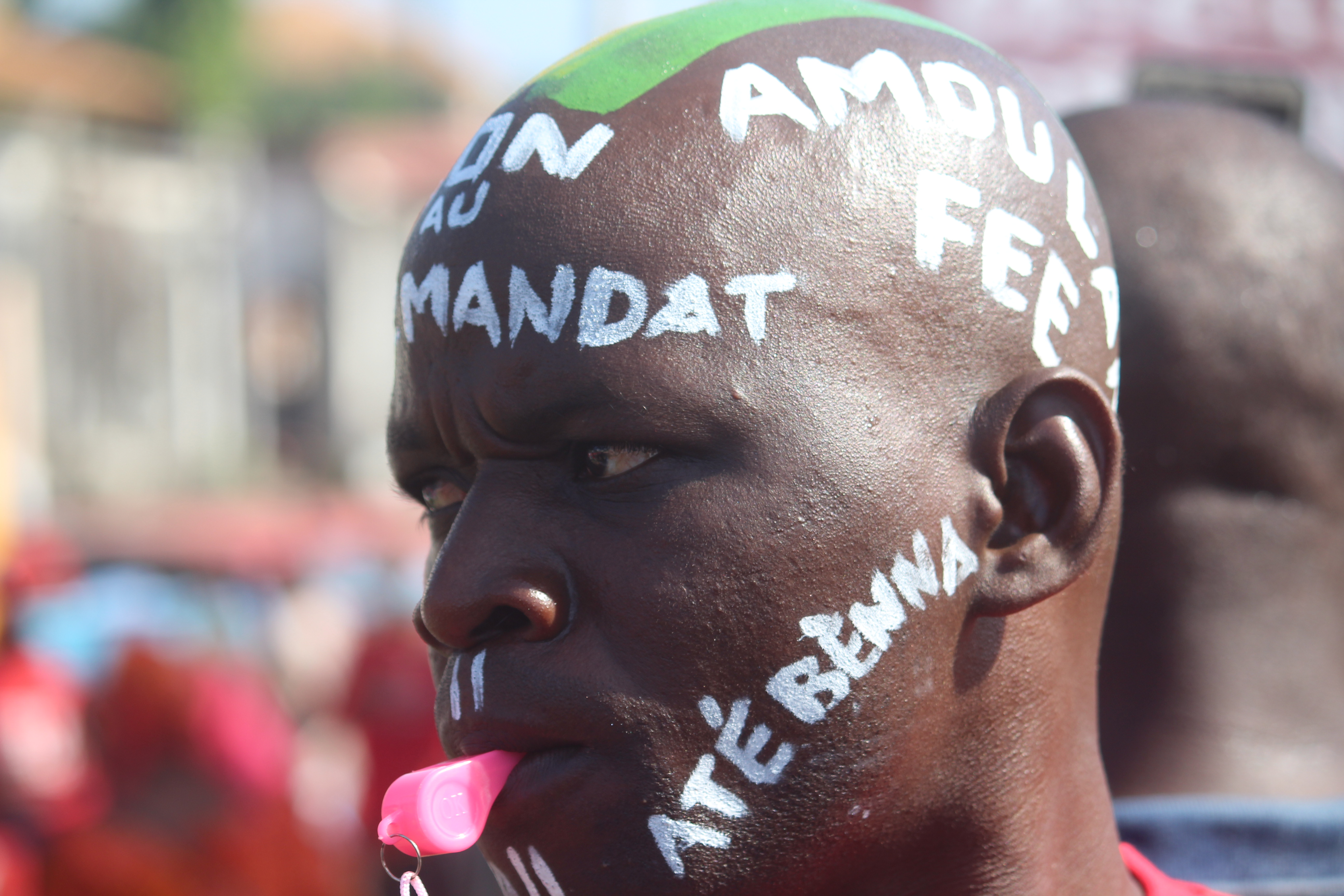
Manifestations in Nzérékoré and protester in Nzérékoré

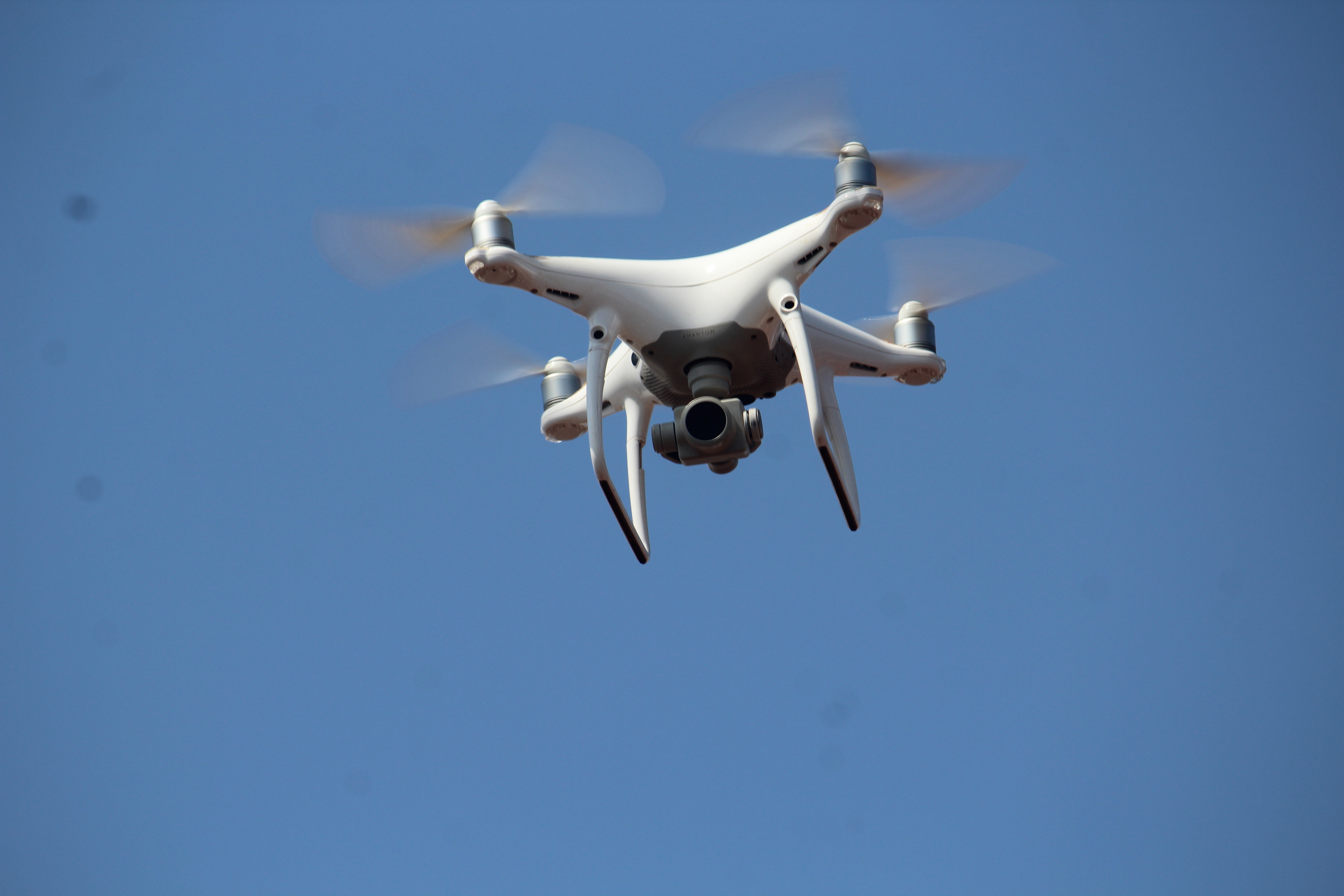
Drones used to hover protests

== See also ==
- 2007 Guinean general strike
- 2009 Guinea protests
- 2013 Guinea clashes
- 2019–2020 Liberian protests
