= 2019–2020 Liberian protests =

Liberian protests

The 2019–2020 Liberian protests were a series of mass protests and civil disobedience campaigns as part of a popular movement by civilians in Liberia against economic turmoil; protesters demanded the resignation of the government of George Weah due to the crisis. Protesters first began their anti-government rallies in June, however, police fired tear gas to disperse protesters while the internet was shut down in an attempt to quell mass protests. Opposition protests were organised throughout June, watched over by a heavy military presence. Protests consisted of nonviolent demonstrations, general strikes, barricades and bloodless disturbances.

Demonstrations re-erupted in December during which strikes and weekly protests were staged and held led by the opposition, with the biggest on 6–7 January 2020. Police used a water cannon to clear chanting and marching demonstrators and protesters, some of whom were setting tires on fire. Demonstrations and strikes continued for the week, however, the government managed to contain the movement by banning assemblies, protests and some members of the opposition. Protest activities and social protests were quelled in Monrovia.

== See also ==
- 2019–2020 Guinean protests
