= 2020 Guinean presidential election =

- 18 October 2020
- Registered: 5,367,198
- Turnout: 79.51%
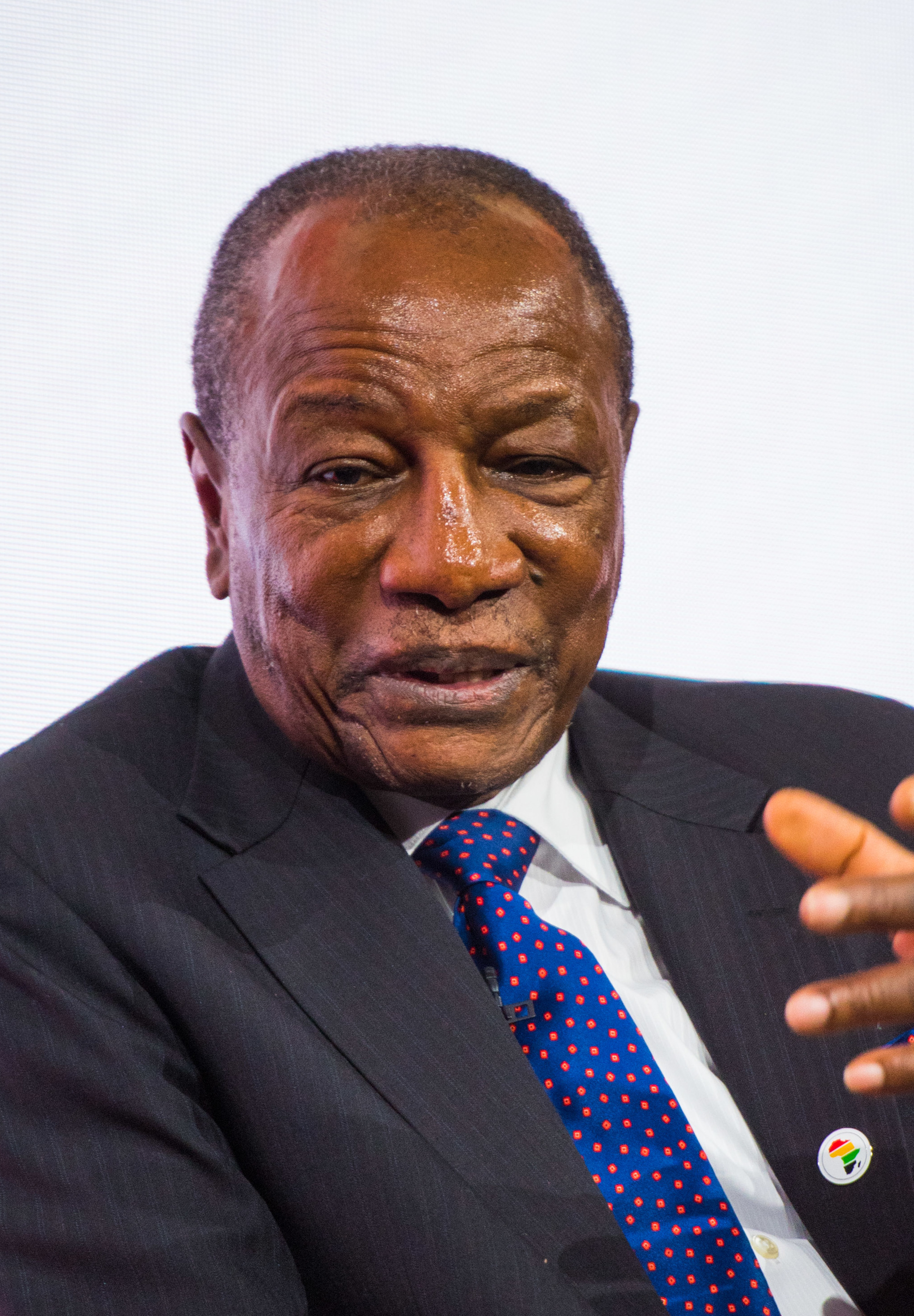

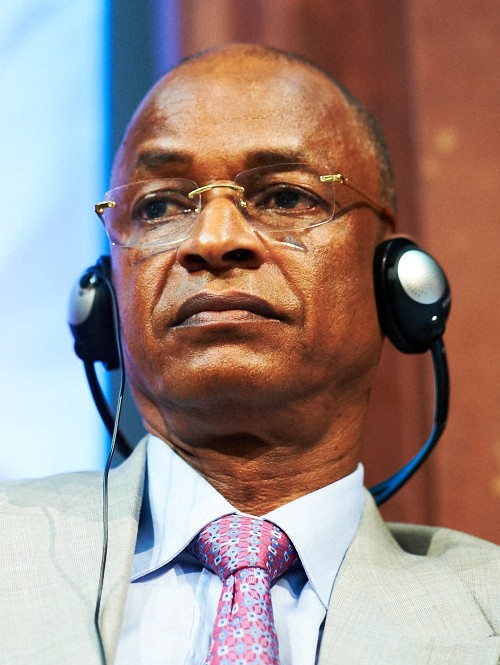
Nominee	Alpha Condé	Cellou Dalein Diallo
Party	RPG	UFDG
Popular vote	2,438,815	1,372,920
Percentage	59.50%	33.49%
President before election
Alpha Condé
RPG
Elected President
Alpha Condé
RPG

Presidential elections were held in Guinea on 18 October 2020. Incumbent president Alpha Condé was running for a third term. He was challenged by former prime minister Cellou Dalein Diallo, as well as several other candidates.

== Background ==
The Guinean constitution limits a president to two terms. However, changes in the new constitution passed in the controversial constitutional referendum earlier in the year included resetting the presidential terms allowing incumbent president Alpha Condé to run for a third term. Both the referendum and the legislative election being run alongside it was boycotted by most of the opposition, and was marred by protests.

Former prime minister Cellou Dalein Diallo who ran against Condé and placed second in the previous two presidential elections ran again after first considering boycotting the vote, and was seen as the main challenger. Protests against the incumbent president have continued throughout the year. The protests have been harshly repressed by security forces claiming a number of civilian lives.

== Electoral system ==
The elections were held using the two-round system, with a second round taking place between the top two finishers on 24 November 2020 if no candidate received more than 50% of the vote in the first round.

== Results ==
Preliminary estimates were reported to indicate that Diallo was in the lead. On 19 October, Diallo declared himself the winner of the election despite the official results not being known yet, based on polling information gathered by his party. The incumbent president condemned this declaration as "irresponsible and dangerous." The electoral commission expected the official results to be released by the end of the week. With 96.14% of the results counted, the Independent National Electoral Commission declared incumbent president Alpha Condé the winner in the first round with 59.49% of the vote on 24 October.

Candidate	Party	Votes	%
Alpha Condé	Rally of the Guinean People	2,438,815	59.50
Cellou Dalein Diallo	Union of Democratic Forces of Guinea	1,372,920	33.49
Ibrahima Abé Sylla	New Generation for the Republic	63,676	1.55
Ousmane Kaba	Party of Democrats for Hope	48,623	1.19
Ousmane Doré	National Movement for Development	46,235	1.13
Makalé Camara	Front for National Alliance	29,958	0.73
Makalé Traoré	Party of Civic Action for Work	29,589	0.72
Abdoul Kabèlè Camara	Guinean Rally for Development	22,507	0.55
Abdoulaye Kourouma	Rally for Renaissance and Development	19,073	0.47
Moro Mandjouf Sidibé	Alliance for the Forces of Change	10,362	0.25
Laye Souleymane Diallo	Party of Freedom and Progress	9,619	0.23
Bouya Konaté	Union for the Defence of Republican Interests	7,544	0.18
Total		4,098,921	100.00
Valid votes		4,098,921	96.05
Invalid/blank votes		168,653	3.95
Total votes		4,267,574	100.00
Registered voters/turnout		5,367,198	79.51
Source: CENI Guinea

== Aftermath ==
Diallo called for mass demonstrations after Condé's victory was certified by the election commission. The post-election period saw national protests in which at least 12 people were killed by security forces, including two children in Conakry.

Monitors from the African Union and ECOWAS said the election took place transparently and was conducted properly.

In September 2021, the military overthrew Condé in a coup d'état and detained him.

== See also ==
- 2021 Guinean coup d'état
- 2020 Ivorian presidential election
- President of the Republic of Guinea
