= 1990 Guinean constitutional referendum =

- 23 December 1990
- Do you approve of the new constitution?

Results
Choice	Votes	%
Yes	2,883,156	98.68%
No	38,578	1.32%
Valid votes	2,921,734	99.82%
Invalid or blank votes	5,234	0.18%
Total votes	2,926,968	100.00%
Registered voters/turnout	3,004,961	97.4%

A constitutional referendum was held in Guinea on 23 December 1990. The new constitution was approved by 98.7% of voters, with a turnout of 97.4%.

== Results ==
Choice	Votes	%
For	2,883,156	98.68
Against	38,578	1.32
Invalid/blank votes	5,234	-
Total	2,926,968	100
Registered voters/turnout	3,004,961	97.40
Source: African Elections Database
