= Moustapha Kourouma =

Burkinabé footballer

Personal information
- Full name: Moustapha Kourouma
- Date of birth: October 11, 1977 (age 49)
- Place of birth: Abidjan, Ivory Coast
- Height: 1.85 m (6 ft 1 in)
- Position: Defender

Senior career*
Years	Team	Apps	(Gls)
1995–1996	ASC Bouake	27	(0)
1996–1997	Stella Club d'Adjamé	42	(0)
1999–2003	Jendouba Sport	80	(11)
2003–2004	Lakota FC	26	(0)
2004–2005	Qatar SC	13	(0)
2005–2006	AS Mangasport	19	(0)
2007–?	Issia Wazi	83	(3)

International career
2006	Burkina Faso	2	(0)
- * Club domestic league appearances and goals

Moustapha Kourouma (born October 11, 1977, in Abidjan) is a Burkinabé footballer.

== Career ==
Kourouma was transferred in January 2007 from AS Mangasport to Issia Wazi, and played with Wazi at the CAF Confederations Cup.

== International career ==
He was a member of the Burkina Faso national football team.
