= Abdoulaye Kourouma =

Guinean politician

Deputy in the National Assembly (Guinea)
- President: Alpha Conde

Personal details
- Born: Guinée Forestière
- Party: Rally for Renaissance and Development
- Education: University of Kankan, Institut Supérieur d’ingénierie de Dakar
- Committees: Committee for Foreign Affairs and Guineans abroad

Abdoulaye Kourouma is a Guinean politician in the National Assembly (Guinea). He is a member of the minority Rally for Renaissance and Development party. He is President of the Guinea-Korea Association for development
