= Guinéenne de Large Bande =

La Guinéenne de la Large Bande
- Trade name: GUILAB SA
- Industry: Telecommunications
- Founded: March 2011 - December 19, 2012: official launch of ACE submarine cable network - June 2, 2014: official inauguration of ACE cable Kipé landing station by the President of the Republic of Guinea, HE Prof. Alpha Conde
- Headquarters: Conakry, Guinea
- Total equity: GNF 227 130 000 000
- Owners: Guinean Government (52,55%), ORANGE GUINEE (26,25%), AREEBA GUINEE (7,20%), ETI (5,09%), CELLCOM GUINEE (2,55%), MOUNA GROUP TECHNOLOGY (2,55%), INTERCEL (1,27%), SKYVISION GUINEE (1,27%), VDC TELECOM (1,27%)
- Website: www.guilab.com.gn

La Guinéenne de la Large Bande is a limited company in charge of managing the capacity allocated to Guinea on the Africa Coast Europe submarine cable (ACE) since March 2013.

GUILAB is an infrastructure provider for telecommunications operators and Internet service providers looking for connection to ACE consortium submarine cable, giving them access to high speed broadband capabilities. It aids in incoming and outgoing international communications to and originating from Guinea.

== History ==
In 2010, Guinea had the opportunity to connect for the first time to a submarine cable system and joined the Africa Coast to Europe project as member of the Consortium, through SOTELGUI (Société de Télécommunications de Guinée) the incumbent operator. To finance the operation and involve economic actors already settled in Guinea, the Guinean government has partnered with private operators. The partnership resulted in the creation of GUILAB SA. Indeed, studies conducted in the past by the World Bank lead to the conclusion that for certain types of projects, such as those developed in the telecommunications sector, it is preferable that the sub-Saharan African countries should partner with private investors. The aim is to boost their economies by promoting economic models based on a public-private consortium. Two Guinean companies part of ACE Consortium at its inception in 2010 -Orange Guinea and SOTELGUI- have transferred their rights to GUILAB.

== Status and Role ==
GUILAB limited company was founded in March 2011. It is governed by the Company Law of the Republic of Guinea and has a capital of 227 130 000 000 GNF. It is primarily responsible for :

- monitoring ACE submarine cable deployment
- managing the capacity generated by the ACE project
- implementing tools to assess and monitor the capacity from the ACE cable and that allocated to each operator.

Through GUILAB, the Government ensures open access to all licensed Telecommunications operators in Guinea. GUILAB also represents and ensures the common interests of its shareholders within the ACE Consortium.

== Shareholders and Public Private Partnership ==
GUILAB was established through a partnership between the Government of Guinea and private telecommunications operators. It is 52.55% majority owned by the Guinean government. Through GUILAB, the Government ensures open access to all licensed Telecommunications operators in Guinea. Private shareholders are : ORANGE GUINEE (26,25%) AREEBA GUINEE (7,20%) ETI (5,09%) CELLCOM GUINEE (2,55%) MOUNA GROUP TECHNOLOGY (2,55%) INTERCEL (1,27%) SKYVISION GUINEE (1,27%) VDC TELECOM (1,27%)

All the capacity allocated to GUILAB in the ACE consortium is available to its shareholders in proportion to their participation: telecom operators have a right of access to capacity on the cable through direct participation in the share capital of GUILAB. The statutes of indicate that all shareholders commit to providing fair and equitable access to capacity on the Cable to interested third parties through rental or acquisition of rights of usage.

== Funding ==
The ACE project required a total investment of 700 million US $ from Telecommunications operators and member countries. With a 25 million U.S. $ grant from the World Bank to the Guinean state through WARCIP-Guinea (West African Regional Communication Infrastructure Program), Guinean total investment amounts to 33.9 million U.S. $ and GUILAB share within the consortium to 4.9%.

== Technical information ==
Africa Coast to Europe submarine cable connects Europe to the west coast of Africa by an optic fiber system. 17 000 km long, this cable will connect 21 countries from France to South Africa. The project was designed by Orange and its construction performed by ASN (Alcatel-Lucent Submarine Networks). The first phase took place in December 2012.

The landing station of the ACE cable in Conakry is on the S2 segment. The ends of the segment S2 are in Dakar, Senegal, and Abidjan in Côte d'Ivoire. The segment links Senegal, Gambia, Guinea, Sierra Leone, Liberia and Côte d'Ivoire.

With a capacity of 5.12 Tera bits per second, the cable with a diameter of 4 to 5 cm goes to depths approaching 6,000 m under sea level. The technology used, WDM (Wavelength Division Multiplexing) can increase the capacity required (upgrades) depending on the needs and technological advances without resorting to a subsea intervention. ACE also provides connectivity with terrestrial fiber networks. With an initial capacity of 40 Giga bits per second allocated on the cable, GUILAB currently operates the equivalent of 32 STM1, and shows an availability rate of 99.5%.

== Notes and references ==
- Broadband for Africa. Developing backbone communication networks. Marc D.J. Williams. International Bank for Reconstruction and Development/World Bank. Washington D.C. 2010.
- http://www.societeguinee.com/fr/actualites/104-revue-a-mi-parcours-du-warcip-guinee
