= 2001 Guinean constitutional referendum =

- 11 November 2001
- Do you approve of the new constitution?

Results
| Choice | Votes | % |
|---|---|---|
| Yes | 3,644,653 | 98.36% |
| No | 60,769 | 1.64% |
| Valid votes | 3,705,422 | 98.59% |
| Invalid or blank votes | 52,968 | 1.41% |
| Total votes | 3,758,390 | 100.00% |
| Registered voters/turnout | 4,310,081 | 87.2% |

A constitutional referendum was held in Guinea on 11 November 2001. The new constitution would remove presidential term limits, and increase the term from five to seven years. It was approved by 98% of voters, and although boycotted by the opposition, turnout was reported to be 87%.

== Results ==
| Choice | Votes | % |
|---|---|---|
| For | 3,644,653 | 98.36 |
| Against | 60,769 | 1.64 |
| Total | 3,705,422 | 100.00 |
| Valid votes | 3,705,422 | 98.59 |
| Invalid/blank votes | 52,968 | 1.41 |
| Total votes | 3,758,390 | 100.00 |
| Registered voters/turnout | 4,310,081 | 87.20 |
Source: African Elections Database
