= Mamady, Republic of Bashkortostan =

Mamady Мамады
- Village
- Location within Bashkortostan Location within Russia
- Coordinates: 55°46′N 55°35′E
- Country: Russia
- Region: Bashkortostan
- District: Burayevsky District
- Time zone: UTC+5:00

Mamady (Russian: Мамады; Bashkir: Мамаҙы, Mamaźı) is a rural locality (a village) in Azyakovsky Selsoviet, Burayevsky District, Bashkortostan, Russia. The population was 339 as of 2010. There are 5 streets.

== Geography ==
Mamady is located 23 km southeast of Burayevo (the district's administrative centre) by road. Aldarovo is the nearest rural locality.
