= Mamady "Wadaba" Kourouma =

Drummer from Guinea

Mamady "WADABA" Kourouma is a drummer from Guinea.

He was born into a blacksmith family of traditional Malinke drummers and raised in the village of Oroko near Kouroussa, Guinea. He learned from the age of eight all of his people's traditional drum music and dances as passed down from his ancestors. He was nicknamed "The Great Panther" because of his powerful sound on the djembe drum. In 1985 he became the primary apprentice of the legendary djembe master Famoudou Konaté. Since then he has toured in Germany, Japan, and the United States, teaching and performing with Konaté and Mamady Keïta, and with his own group, Annye Ben. Wadaba has appeared on four CDs with the great masters, plus his own CD, Oroko Kan. In 2003, Famoudou Konaté released him from his apprenticeship and proclaimed him a master drummer and drum builder in his own right. He is a director for the charity organization, the Oroko Fund, and featured instructor for the African Village Drum Adventure in Guinea.
