= Alpha Condé =

President of Guinea from 2010 to 2021

- ߊߟߑߝߊ߫ ߞߐ߲ߘߍ߫
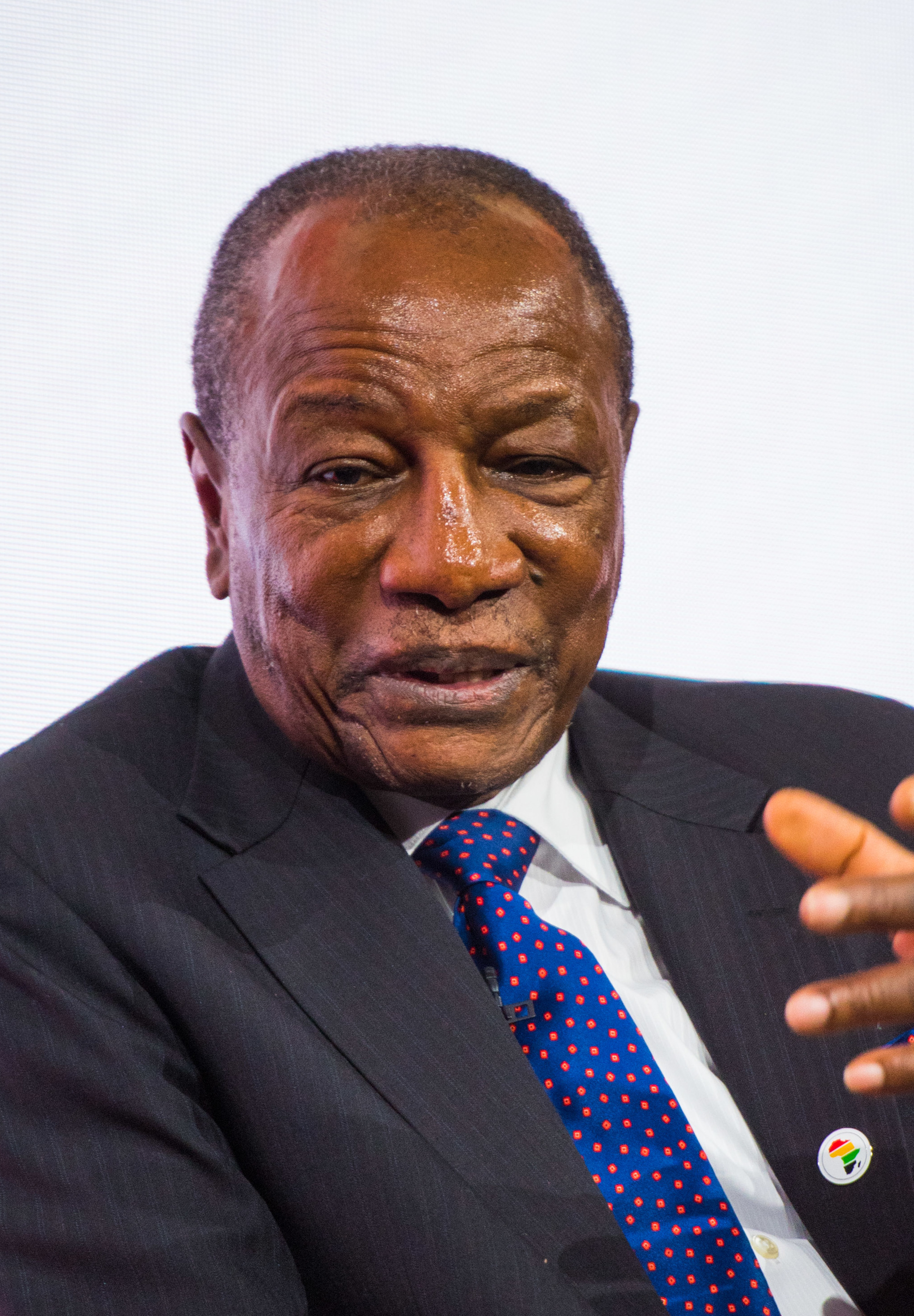
- Condé in 2020

4th President of Guinea
- In office 21 December 2010 – 5 September 2021
- Prime Minister: Jean-Marie Doré; Mohamed Said Fofana; Mamady Youla; Ibrahima Kassory Fofana
- Preceded by: Sékouba Konaté (acting)
- Succeeded by: Mamadi Doumbouya

15th Chairperson of the African Union
- In office 30 January 2017 – 28 January 2018
- Preceded by: Idriss Déby
- Succeeded by: Paul Kagame

Personal details
- Born: 4 March 1938 (age 88) Boké, French Guinea (now Guinea)
- Party: Rally of the Guinean People
- Spouse: Djene Kaba (died 2023)
- Education: Sciences Po; Pantheon-Sorbonne University

Alpha Condé (N'Ko: ߊߟߑߝߊ߫ ߞߐ߲ߘߍ߫; born 4 March 1938) is a Guinean politician who served as the fourth president of Guinea from 2010 to 2021. He spent decades in opposition to a succession of regimes in Guinea, unsuccessfully running against then-President Lansana Conté in the 1993 and 1998 presidential elections and leading the Rally of the Guinean People (RPG), an opposition party.

Standing again in the 2010 presidential election, Condé was elected president in a second round of voting. Upon his election, he said he would strengthen Guinea as a democracy and fight corruption.

When Condé took office in December 2010, he became the first freely elected president in the country's history. He was reelected in 2015 with about 58% of the vote, and again in 2020 with 59.5% after a constitutional referendum which allowed Condé to "reset" his term limit and seek two more terms. The move was controversial and sparked massive protests before and after the referendum, which were brutally repressed. Condé's critics have claimed there was fraud in the 2015 and 2020 elections. On 30 January 2017, Condé succeeded Chad's Idriss Déby as head of the African Union. He was succeeded by Rwandan president Paul Kagame on 28 January 2018. On 5 September 2021, the Guinea Armed Forces arrested Condé and overthrew him.

== Early life ==
Condé was born on 4 March 1938 in Boke in Lower Guinea. His parents were from Upper Volta.

Condé left for France at the age of 15. He was active in the National Union of Higher Education (SNESUP), the Association of Guinean Students in France (AEGF), and the Black African Students Federation in France (FEANF), of which he was claimed to be the Executive Coordinator of African National Groups (GN) from 1967 to 1975, overseeing the activities of the Directorate of FEANF.

Condé wrote a master's thesis in political science, Le P.D.G. et le peuple de Guinée, in 1965.

== Early political career ==
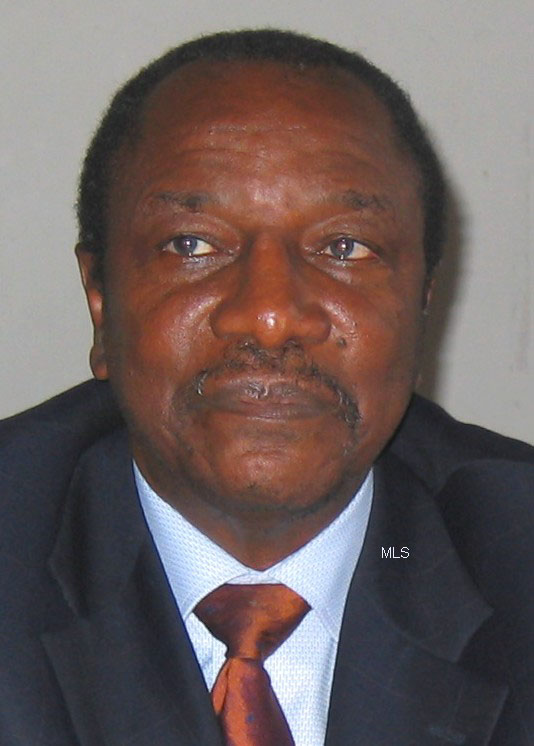
Condé in 2007

Condé won 18 percent of the vote in Guinea's first multiparty presidential election, held on 19 December 1993. Lansana Conté, who had been president since a 1984 coup d'état, won the election with 51.7 percent of the vote. Condé's supporters alleged fraud in this election after the Supreme Court nullified results in the Kankan and Siguiri prefectures, where Condé had received more than 60 percent of the vote. Condé's supporters retorted with intimidation, ballot stuffing and violence in the Kankan and Siguiri prefectures resulting in the Supreme Court nullifying the results in those prefectures. In the 1998 presidential election, Condé ran again and received 17.6 percent of the vote, placing third behind Conté (56.1 percent) and Mamadou Boye Bâ (24.6 percent). On 16 December, two days after the poll, Condé was arrested and charged with trying to leave the country illegally; he was also charged with attempting to recruit forces to destabilize the government.

Controversy during his detention focused on whether he could be represented by foreign as well as domestic lawyers, and whether defense lawyers were being given full access to him in jail. Condé's trial, initially scheduled to begin in September 1999, did not begin until April 2000. Condé, along with 47 co-defendants, was charged with hiring mercenaries, planning to assassinate President Conté, and upsetting the state's security. Defense lawyers began by calling for the judge to immediately release their clients, then quit, saying that under the circumstances they could not properly make a defense. The trial was thus delayed several times, during which time Condé refused to speak in court, and his co-defendants denied all of the charges. The trial finally continued in August, and in mid-September Condé was sentenced to jail for five years.

However, Condé was released in May 2001 when he was pardoned by President Conté, with the condition that he was prohibited from engaging in political activities. Following his release, he left Guinea for France, returning in July 2005. Upon his return, some reports indicated that he intended to organize the RPG for the municipal elections held in late 2005, but later stated his intention to boycott them.

Following Conté's death and the 23 December 2008 military coup, Condé met with Moussa Dadis Camara, the President of the National Council for Democracy and Development (CNDD), on 27 December 2008. After the meeting, Condé said that the members of the CNDD junta were "patriots". Condé lobbied the CNDD junta to arrest and jail Condé's political rivals. Later, however, Condé opposed the junta after failing to push the CNDD junta to intimidate and disqualify Condé's political rivals. Moussa Dadis Camara publicly exposed Condé's request to commit anti-democratic and anti-constitutional acts on his behalf.

== Presidency (2010–2021) ==
=== 2010 election ===
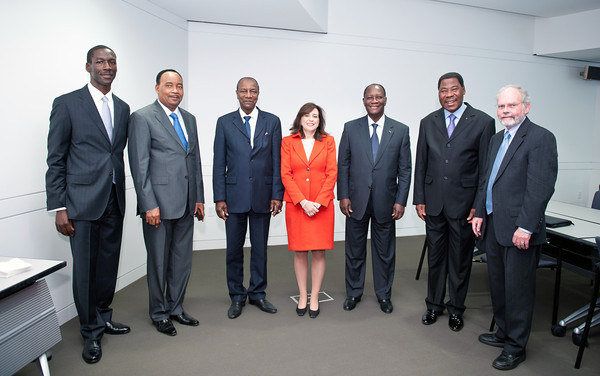
Alpha Condé (third from left) in 2011

Condé stood again in the June–November 2010 presidential election. During the first round, he received 18 percent of the votes, while Cellou Dalein Diallo placed first with over 40 percent. On 15 November 2010 Condé was declared the winner of the second round with 52.5 percent. Imogen Rose-Smith from Institutional Investor said that his win was "surprising" given his "poor results" in previous elections and in the first round of this election.

After he was elected, Condé attempted to improve the mining law in Guinea, in consultation with George Soros in order to reduce corruption in the sector and increase the country's benefit. Condé turned to Soros to help draw up a mining code that would reduce corruption and increase the government's stake from 15% to 35%.

According to various documents that were allegedly leaked to the international NGO Global Witness, mining company Sable Mining was involved in helping Condé win the 2010 election in return for mining rights in the country. Global Witness reported that Sable Supported Condé's election campaign, organized logistics and strategic meetings, offered to loan him a helicopter, and paid bribe money to his son, Alpha Mohammed Condé, in order to secure mining permits in a number of areas, including Mount Nimba. In an email allegedly sent from Alpha Mohammed Condé to Sable in August 2010, he said that backing his father's campaign "will make my dad all the more comfortable to support our business partnerships".

=== Alleged assassination attempt ===
On 19 July 2011, the presidential residence was shelled, resulting in the death of a presidential guard and the injuries of two others. Condé survived the alleged assassination attempt. A former army chief and a member of the presidential guard were arrested hours after the two attacks on his house. The President later spoke to the country saying that "My house was attacked last night, but I congratulate the presidential guard who fought heroically from 3:10 until 5:00 before backup arrived." He also added that his plans for reform would not fail.

Three days later at least 41 soldiers were arrested for the assassination attempt. A government official said that many of those arrested had ties to the country's previous military rulers.

The United Nations reacted by saying that there was a greater need for military reforms in Guinea. The UN Special Representative for West Africa, Said Djinnit, said that the assault showed "weaknesses remain in Guinea's defence and security systems [and] reinforces the UN's determination to support the country's military reforms. I saw the damage...[the attack] clearly intended to kill the president."

=== 2013 pre-election violence ===
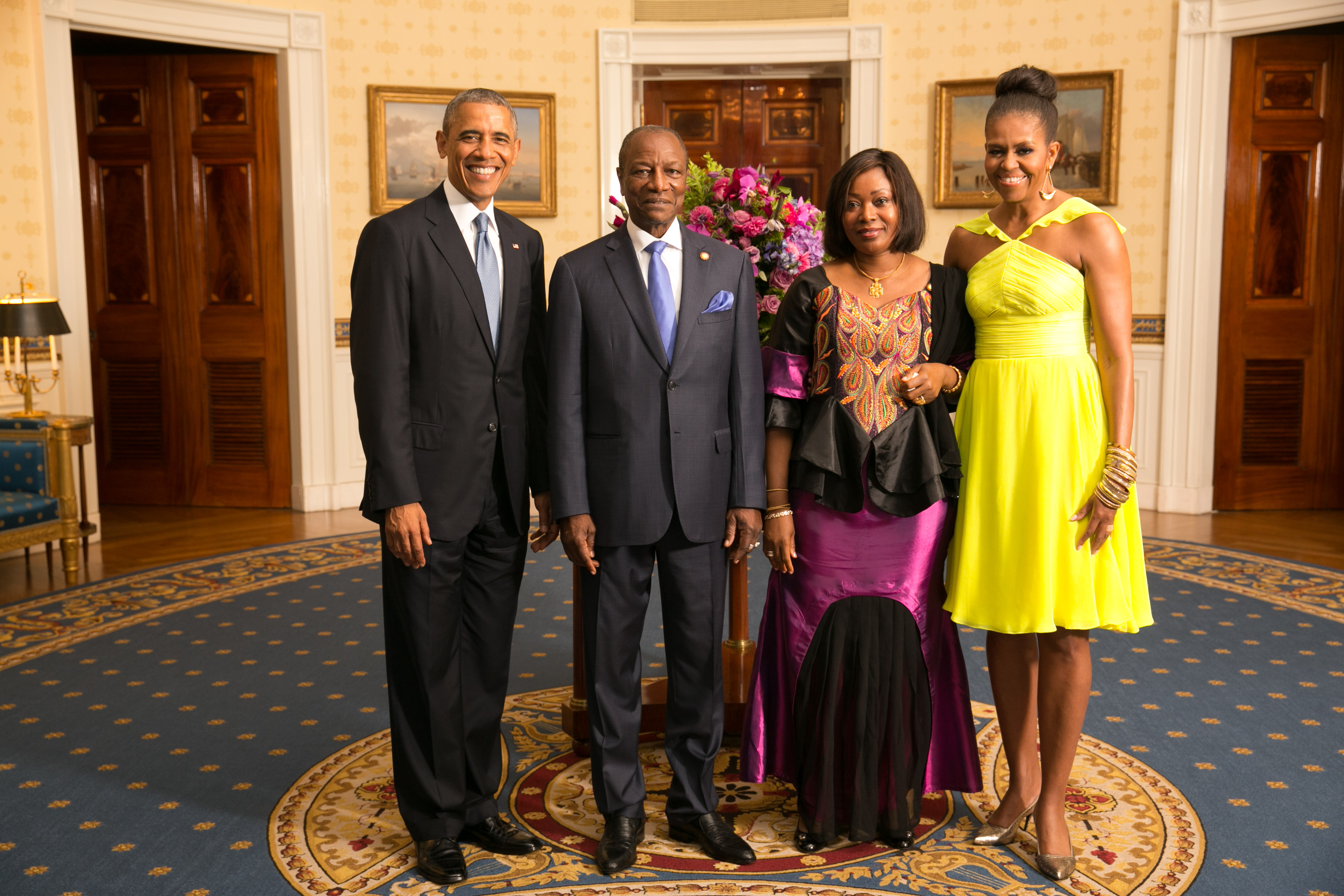
Alpha Condé, his wife and the Obamas in August 2014

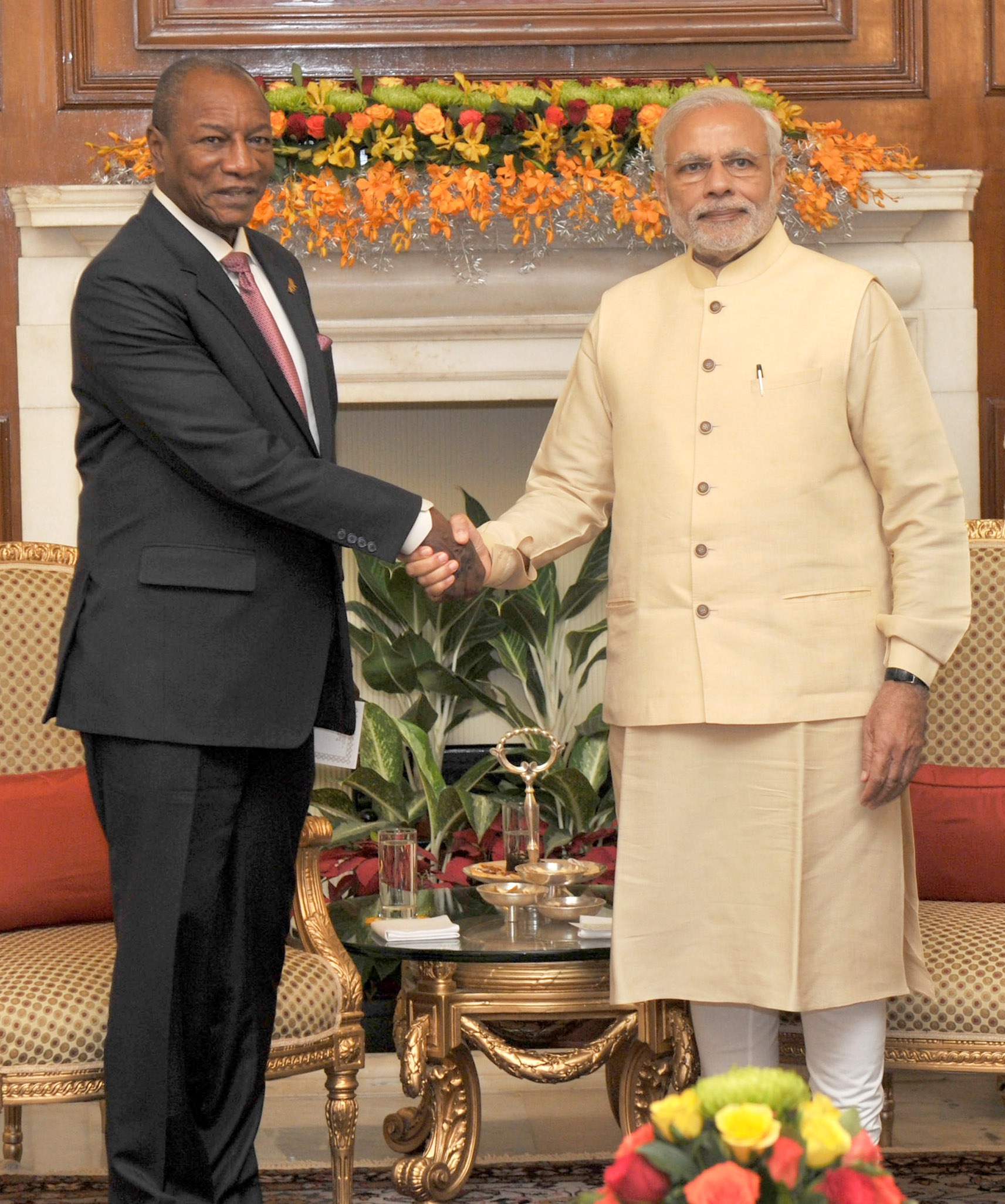
Modi and Condé in New Delhi, October 2015

Condé received criticism during week-long protests and violence in late February and early March 2013, after opposition supporters took to the streets of Conakry to peacefully protest against his attempts to rig the 2013 parliamentary election. The opposition coalition withdrew from the electoral process in mid-February, mainly due to Condé's insistence on using a South African firm, Waymark Infotech, to draw up the registered voter list to his political party's benefit.

The ensuing violence resulted in at least twenty deaths and hundreds injured by Condé's security forces, who used live ammunition to disperse peaceful protesters.

Voting finally took place on 28 September. Local and international observers stated that the process was significantly flawed, stating that they observed ballot stuffing, voter intimidation, and minors casting votes. These organizational problems and irregularities led to a three-week delay in the announcement of the election results, which in turn led to further tension. Regional UN and EU representatives intervened and strongly recommended that the situation be addressed peacefully via the legal system.

=== Ebola outbreak ===
While the 2014 Ebola epidemic worsened in Liberia and Sierra Leone, Condé downplayed the outbreak and insisted that his government had everything under control. Researchers have suggested that the Condé government's interest in attracting foreign investment, particularly in the mining industry, led to him downplaying the spread of the epidemic.

In response to the outbreak, Condé suspended travel bans, stopped flights and implemented widespread quarantine restrictions. Guinea's economy was damaged by the outbreak. During a two day United Nations conference, Condé was optimistic about receiving US$3.4 billion for the nations effected by the epidemic.

In August 2015 Alpha Condé met with Dr Mohamed Belhocine to discuss about the Ebola vaccine. Condé was stressed about how effective was the vaccine. Following that meeting he gave instructions for the establishment of a technical committee for Guinea, tasked with making proposals and recommendations for organizing a national meeting with experts on the Ebola vaccine.

=== 2015 election ===
On 17 October 2015, Condé was re-elected for a second term and given 57.85 percent of the vote, an outright majority in the first round of voting. The election was marred by fraud and mismanagement. Cellou Dalein Diallo, an opposition candidate, rejected the results citing vote rigging by Condé's government, which resorted again to intimidating voters, ballot stuffing, permitting minors to vote, altering the electoral map, and violence against opposition supporters. However, the opposition did not file an official appeal. Condé was sworn in for his second term on 14 December 2015.

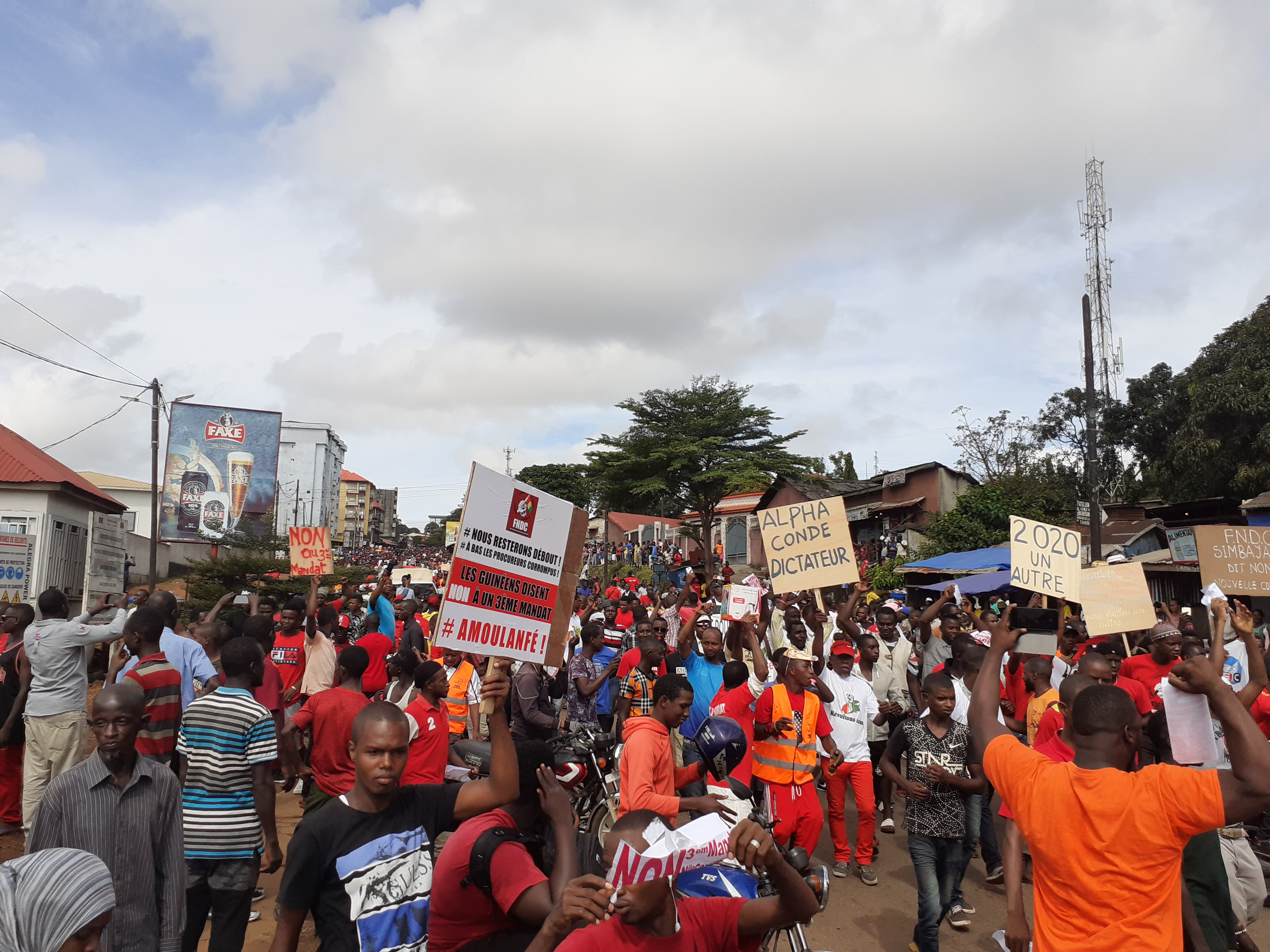
Protests in Conakry on 24 October 2019

=== 2016 corruption allegations ===
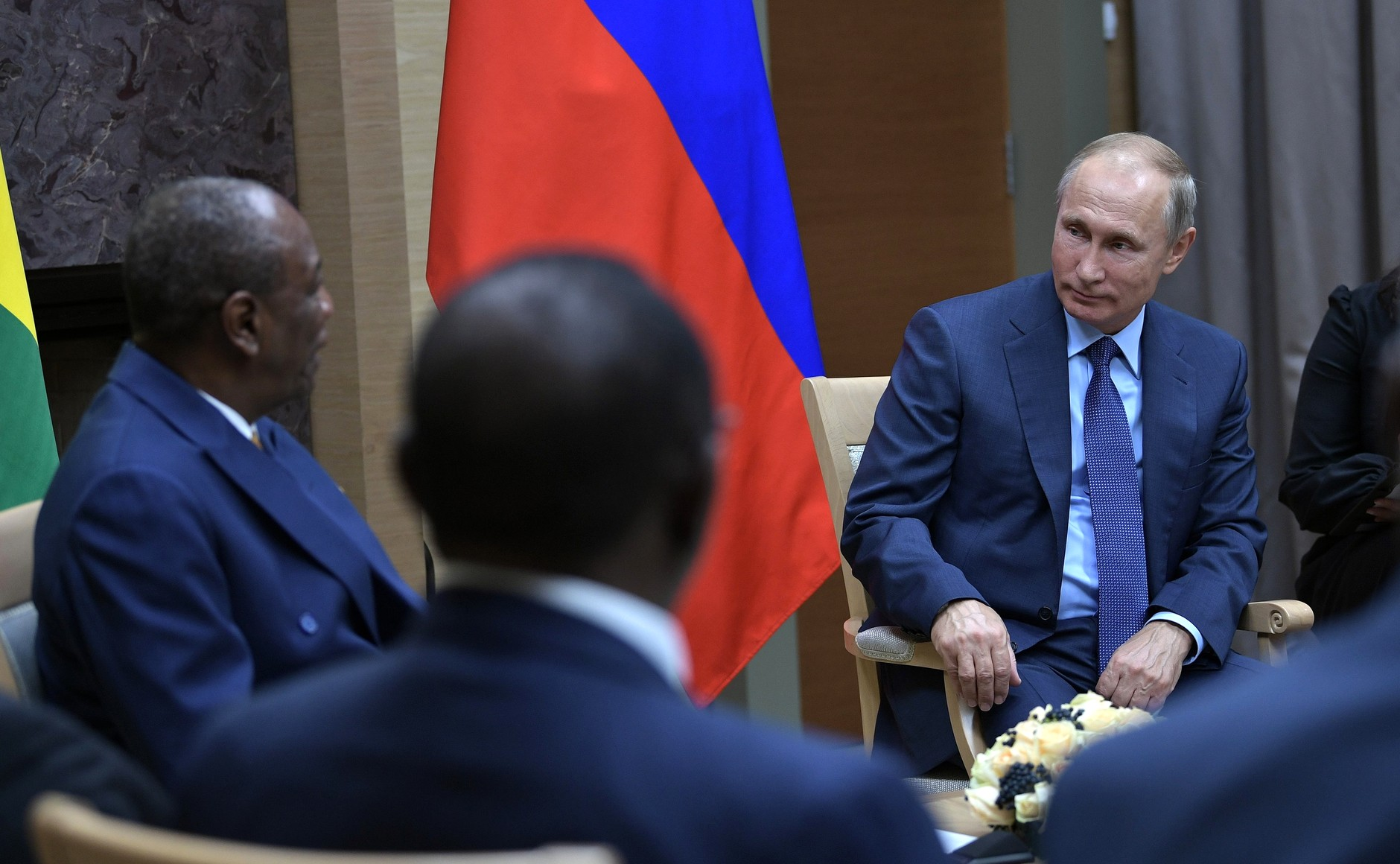
Condé with Russian president Vladimir Putin in 2017

In 2016, France 24 released audio recordings that appear to prove that the mining company Rio Tinto paid Guinean government official and Condé's close acquaintance, François de Combret, a sum of $10.5 million for mining rights in the Simandou mine. President Condé said that de Combret acted alone. Audio recordings did not implicate the president as there was no indication in it that he was not simply demanding down payment on the $700 million contract on behalf of the government with no payoff involved. Rio Tinto admitted to the payment in November 2016.

=== 2019–2020 Guinean protests ===
The 2019–2020 Guinean protests were a series of bloody protests and mass civil unrest in Guinea against the rule of Condé that first broke out on 14 October 2019 against constitutional changes. During the violent clashes, over 90 people may have lost their lives.

=== 2020 election ===
Condé won a third term in October 2020 presidential election, with 59.5% of the vote. Condé stated that a March 2020 constitutional referendum allowed him to run despite a two-term limit. The opposition rejected the results over allegations of fraud, and violent protests erupted across the country.

=== Economy ===
Under his administration, the Guinean economy grew at an average 5% and Guineans usually earned about $3.20.

== Overthrow ==
On 5 September 2021, Condé was captured and overthrown by the military. Promising to change the political landscape of Guinea, the military's Special Forces dissolved the constitution and shut the country's land and air borders. Lieutenant-Colonel Mamady Doumbouya, the head of the Special Forces, said that government corruption and mismanagement precipitated the coup.

Condé was released from military detention and was sent to the residence of his wife, Djene Kaba Condé, in Conakry; she thanked the military junta for releasing her husband and "guaranteeing him treatment worthy of his rank".

== Awards and decorations ==
=== National honours ===
- Guinea:
  - Grand Cross with Collar of the National Order of Merit

=== Foreign honours ===
- Namibia:
  - Grand Commander of the Order of the Welwitschia (9 May 2019)
- Russia:
  - Recipient of the Order of Friendship (28 September 2017)

== Personal life ==
Condé is a Muslim. He was married to Djene Kaba Condé until her death in 2023. Condé has one son, Alpha Mohamed Condé.

== Sanctions ==
On 9 December 2022, the Office of Foreign Assets Control of the United States Department of the Treasury sanctioned Condé and over forty others for acts of corruption and human rights violations.

== Bibliography ==
- Bothorel, Jean; Condé, Alpha (2010). Un Africain engagé : ce que je veux pour la Guinée. Paris: Jean Picollet. ISBN 9782864772446. OCLC 650206262.

Political offices
Preceded by Sékouba Konaté; Acting	President of Guinea; 2010–2021	Succeeded by Mamady Doumbouya; Acting
Diplomatic posts
Preceded by Idriss Déby	Chairperson of the African Union; 2017–2018	Succeeded by Paul Kagame
