= 2020 Guinean constitutional referendum =

- 22 March 2020
- Do you approve of the draft of the new constitution?

Results
Choice	Votes	%
Yes	2,663,198	89.76%
No	303,689	10.24%
Valid votes	2,966,887	98.36%
Invalid or blank votes	49,600	1.64%
Total votes	3,016,487	100.00%
Registered voters/turnout	5,179,600	58.24%
- Results by prefecture Yes: 60–70% 70–80% 80–90% >90%

A constitutional referendum was held in Guinea on 22 March 2020, alongside parliamentary elections. The new constitution would reset presidential term limits (normally two terms), allowing president Alpha Condé to be elected for a third term, among other changes.

== Constitutional amendments ==
The constitutional amendments include:

- Changing the presidential term of office from five to six years, and resetting the current term count for the purposes of term limits of the incumbent president
- Banning female genital mutilation
- Banning under-age and forced marriage
- Giving spouses equal rights in a divorce
- Stating that no one gender would make up more than two-thirds of government institutions
- Fairer distribution of wealth in favour of young people and the poor
- Lowering the parliamentary age of candidacy to 18-years-old

== Conduct ==
The constitutional referendum was originally scheduled to be on 1 March 2020. However it was pushed back as international observers raised concerns about electoral register. The African Union cancelled an electoral observations mission, citing major issues with the poll. The European Union also highlighted its doubt about the poll's credibility.

As a consequence, the authorities removed over 2.5 million unverifiable names (out of a total of 7.7 million names) from the register in line with the advice of the Economic Community of West African States after they were identified by Organisation internationale de la Francophonie. The unverifiable names were mostly concentrated in the region where president Alpha Condé had significant support.

Prior to the vote, United States Secretary of State Mike Pompeo said, "We question whether the process will be free, fair and transparent and accurately reflect the will of all eligible voters. We urge all parties to engage in nonviolent civil dialogue." The United States government also called on authorities to allow peaceful demonstrations while asking opposition to refrain from violence. The British government argued the Government of Guinea to respect democratic institutions and all forms of human rights including the right to peaceful protest, as well as encouraging all parties to engage in constructive dialogue and refrain from using violence. The UK as well called upon the government to ensure the elections and referendum would be conducted in a fair and transparent way.

=== Protests ===
Protests against the referendum in the buildup to polling day led to the deaths of over 32 people between October 2019 to March 2020, with regular protests taking place in Conakry and other cities including Labé, Mamou, Boké and Nzérékoré.

During the protests, several government offices, schools and police stations were attacked with the aim of destroying voting materials. Some of the scenes that took place during that period included attackers entering a police station in Mamou and tearing up voter lists and ransacking boxes of electoral cards; two schools that were planned to be used as polling stations were set on fire; several administrative buildings in the north and southern part of the country were also set on fire; and in Labé, tyres were burnt in the streets and road barricades set up.

The National Front for the Defense of the Constitution (FNDC), an umbrella opposition group, called for a boycott of the referendum and rejected its results.

=== Polling day ===
On the day of the referendum, state controlled Guinea Broadband Guinéenne de Large Bande announced that it expected that internet and telephony services to be disturbed due to a planned maintenance work on undersea cables. Although the planned works were later postponed, NetBlocks confirmed that social media was blocked from 20:00 on the evening before polling day until the morning of the day after, spanning 36 hours. The block included Twitter, Facebook, Instagram while WhatsApp servers were restricted.

Opponents of the proposals attempted to disrupt voting, vandalising voting equipment.

Some polling stations required voters to wash their hands before casting their ballot and radio stations reminded citizens to keep distance from one another however it was noticed that at some polling stations crowds were squeezed in line to vote and few people wore masks.

== Results ==
Preliminary results showed that the new constitution received almost 90% of votes in favor amid a full boycott by opposition parties. Turnout was around 58%. The Constitutional Court made public the final results on 3 April, and proclaimed the new constitution adopted by an absolute majority of voters.

Choice	Votes	%
For	2,663,198	89.76
Against	303,689	10.24
Invalid/blank votes	49,600	–
Total	3,016,487	100
Registered voters/turnout	5,179,600	58.24
Source: Constitutional Court

== Aftermath ==
After the referendum results were announced, protesters went out to the streets again, as with protesting before the referendum, and torched cars, as well as setting up barricades. Protests turned violent in several cities, including Nzérékoré where at least 32 people were killed.

== Reactions ==
Mohamed Ibn Chambas, United Nations special representative to West Africa, released a statement highlighting that the following developments were with great concern. António Guterres, UN Secretary-General, called for a constructive dialogue between the Government, the opposition and civil society. The French government condemned the related violence and said that the vote was not credible.
