= Binko, Sikasso =

Binko
- Village
- Location in Mali
- Coordinates: 11°38′23″N 8°14′39″W
- Country: Mali
- Region: Sikasso Region
- Cercle: Yanfolila Cercle
- Commune: Tagandougou
- Time zone: UTC+0 (GMT)

Binko is a village and seat of the commune of Tagandougou in the Cercle of Yanfolila in the Sikasso Region of southern Mali. The village is 52 km north of Yanfolila on the western side of the Sélingué Dam.
