= Bambala =

- Village
- Location in Mali
- Coordinates: 11°24′1″N 8°18′42″W
- Country: Mali
- Region: Sikasso Region
- Cercle: Yanfolila Cercle
- Commune: Sankarani
- Time zone: UTC+0 (GMT)

Bambala is a village and seat of the commune of Sankarani in the Cercle of Yanfolila in the Sikasso Region of southern Mali. The village is 30 km northwest of Yanfolila on the western shore of Lake Sélingué.
