= Baya, Mali =

Baya
- Commune
- Location in Mali
- Coordinates: 11°38′40″N 8°12′3″W
- Country: Mali
- Region: Sikasso Region
- Cercle: Yanfolila Cercle

Area
  - Total: 128 km^{2} (49 sq mi)

Population (2009 census)
  - Total: 33,519
  - Density: 262/km^{2} (678/sq mi)
- Time zone: UTC+0 (GMT)

Baya is a rural commune in the Cercle of Yanfolila in the Sikasso Region of southern Mali. The commune covers an area of 128 square kilometers and includes the small towns of Kangaré and Dalabala, three villages and part of Lake Sélingué. In the 2009 census the commune had a population of 33,519. The town of Kangaré, the administrative center (chef-lieu) of the commune, lies to the east of the Sélingué Dam, 52 km north of Yanfolila.
