= Kangaré, Mali =

Kangaré
- Town
- Location in Mali
- Coordinates: 11°38′40″N 8°12′3″W
- Country: Mali
- Region: Sikasso Region
- Cercle: Yanfolila Cercle
- Commune: Baya
- Time zone: UTC+0 (GMT)

Kangaré is a small town and seat of the commune of Baya in the Cercle of Yanfolila of the Sikasso Region of southern Mali. The town lies to the east of the Sélingué Dam and 52 km north of Yanfolila.
