= Guélélinkoro =

- Village
- Location in Mali
- Coordinates: 11°8′54″N 8°31′11″W
- Country: Mali
- Region: Sikasso Region
- Cercle: Yanfolila Cercle
- Commune: Djallon-Foula
- Time zone: UTC+0 (GMT)

Guélélinkoro is a village and seat of the rural commune of Djallon-Foula in the Cercle of Yanfolila in the Sikasso Region of southern Mali. The village is 40 km west of the town of Yanfolila and 4 km east of the Sankarani River that marks the border of Mali with Guinea.
