= Soloba =

- Village
- Location in Mali
- Coordinates: 11°11′45″N 8°27′0″W
- Country: Mali
- Region: Sikasso Region
- Cercle: Yanfolila Cercle
- Commune: Yallankoro-Soloba
- Time zone: UTC+0 (GMT)

Soloba is a village and seat of the rural commune of Yallankoro-Soloba in the Cercle of Yanfolila in the Sikasso Region of southern Mali. The village is 32 km west of Yanfolila and 4 km from the Sankarani River that marks the border with Guinea. It is the birthplace of photographer Malick Sidibé.
