= Tagandougou =

- Commune
- Location in Mali
- Coordinates: 11°38′23″N 8°14′39″W
- Country: Mali
- Region: Sikasso Region
- Cercle: Yanfolila Cercle

Area
  - Total: 614 km^{2} (237 sq mi)

Population (2009 census)
  - Total: 5,775
  - Density: 9.41/km^{2} (24.4/sq mi)
- Time zone: UTC+0 (GMT)

Tagandougou is a rural commune in the Cercle of Yanfolila in the Sikasso Region of southern Mali. The commune covers an area of 614 square kilometers and includes 7 villages. In the 2009 census it had a population of 5,775. The village of Binko, the administrative center (chef-lieu) of the commune, is 52 km north of Yanfolila on the western side of the Sélingué Dam.
