= Yallankoro-Soloba =

- Commune
- Location in Mali
- Coordinates: 11°11′45″N 8°27′0″W
- Country: Mali
- Region: Sikasso Region
- Cercle: Yanfolila Cercle

Area
  - Total: 285 km^{2} (110 sq mi)

Population (2009 census)
  - Total: 11,722
  - Density: 41.1/km^{2} (107/sq mi)
- Time zone: UTC+0 (GMT)

Yallankoro-Soloba is a rural commune in the Cercle of Yanfolila in the Sikasso Region of southern Mali. The commune covers an area of 285 square kilometers and includes 8 villages. In the 2009 census it had a population of 11,722. The village of Soloba, the administrative center (chef-lieu) of the commune, is 32 km west of Yanfolila and only around 4 km from the Sankarani River that marks the border with Guinea.
