= Djallon-Foula =

- Commune
- Location in Mali
- Coordinates: 11°8′54″N 8°31′11″W
- Country: Mali
- Region: Sikasso Region
- Cercle: Yanfolila Cercle

Area
  - Total: 471 km^{2} (182 sq mi)

Population (2009 census)
  - Total: 10,678
- Time zone: UTC+0 (GMT)

Djallon-Foula is a rural commune in the Cercle of Yanfolila in the Sikasso Region of southern Mali. The commune covers an area of 471 square kilometers and includes eight villages. In the 2009 census it had a population of 10,678. The village of Guélélinkoro, the administrative center (chef-lieu) of the commune, is 40 km west of Yanfolila and 4 km east of the Sankarani River that marks the border of Mali with Guinea.
