= Sankarani =

- Commune
- Location in Mali
- Coordinates: 11°24′1″N 8°18′42″W
- Country: Mali
- Region: Sikasso Region
- Cercle: Yanfolila Cercle

Area
  - Total: 229 km^{2} (88 sq mi)

Population (2009 census)
  - Total: 7,876
  - Density: 34.4/km^{2} (89.1/sq mi)
- Time zone: UTC+0 (GMT)

Sankarani is a rural commune in the Cercle of Yanfolila in the Sikasso Region of southern Mali. The commune covers an area of 229 square kilometers and includes 8 villages. In the 2009 census it had a population of 7,876. The village of Bambala, the administrative center (chef-lieu) of the commune, is 30 km northwest of Yanfolila on the western shore of Lake Sélingué.
