= Filamana =

- Village
- Location in Mali
- Coordinates: 10°29′55″N 7°57′12″W
- Country: Mali
- Region: Sikasso Region
- Cercle: Yanfolila Cercle
- Commune: Koussan
- Time zone: UTC+0 (GMT)

Filamana is a village and center of the commune of Koussan located in the Cercle of Yanfolila within the Sikasso Region of southern Mali. The village id situated 79 km south-southeast of Yanfolila.
