= Siékorolé =

- Village
- Location in Mali
- Coordinates: 11°19′23″N 8°15′44″W
- Country: Mali
- Region: Sikasso Region
- Cercle: Yanfolila Cercle
- Commune: Séré Moussa Ani Samou
- Time zone: UTC+0 (GMT)

Siékorolé is a village and seat of the commune of Séré Moussa Ani Samou in the Cercle of Yanfolila in the Sikasso Region of southern Mali. The village is 20 km northwest of Yanfolila.
