= Natasha Braier =

Argentine cinematographer

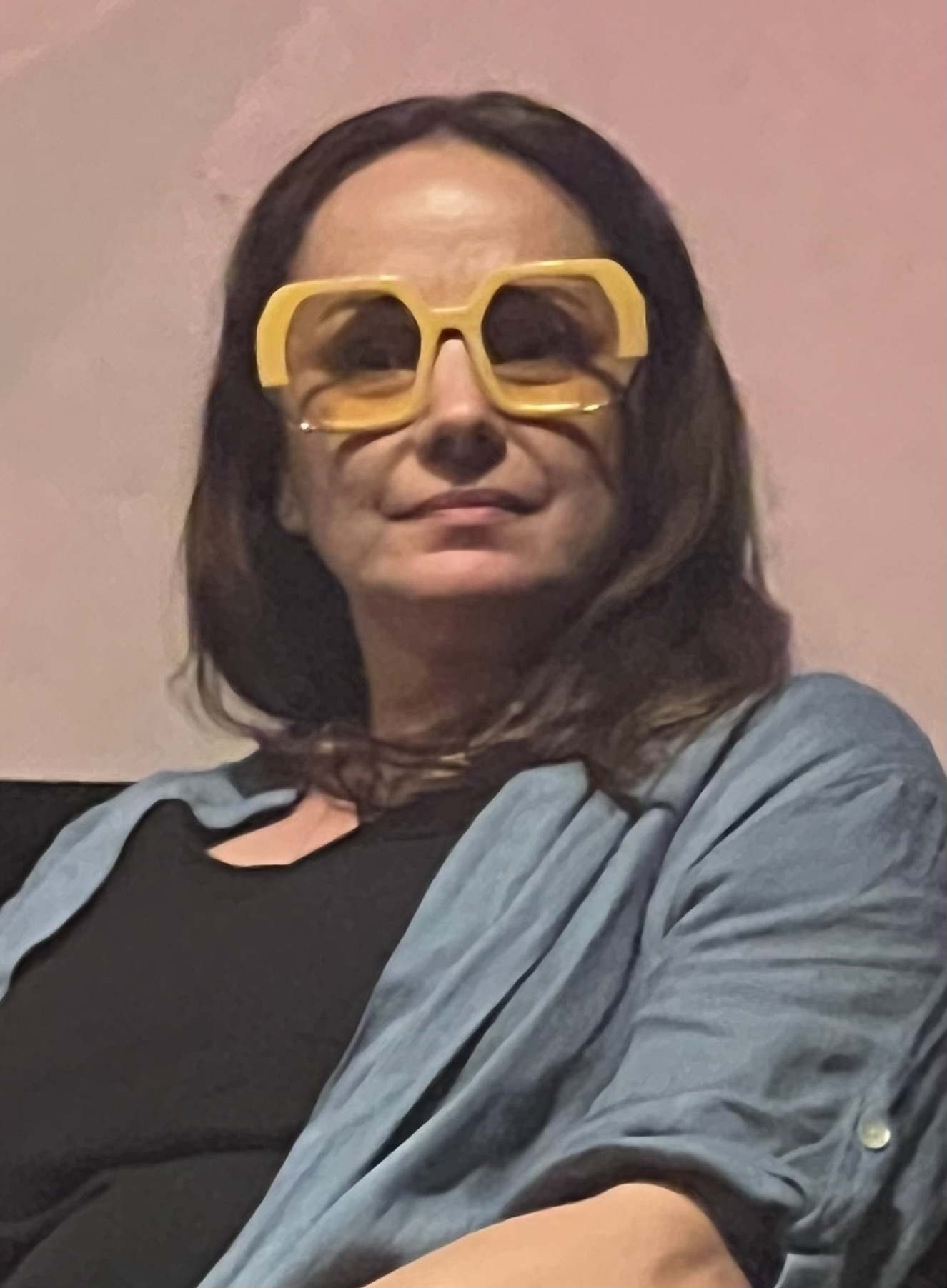
- Braier in 2026
- Born: December 11, 1974 (age 51); Buenos Aires, Argentina
- Occupation: Cinematographer
- Years active: 1996–present

Natasha Braier (born December 11, 1974) is an Argentinian cinematographer.

== Life and career ==
A native of Buenos Aires, Braier is the daughter of two Freudian psychoanalysts.

She earned a master's degree in cinematography at the National Film and Television School.

Braier currently resides in Los Angeles, California.

== Filmography ==
=== Feature film ===
Year	Title	Director	Notes
2005	RedMeansGo	Erica Dunton	
2006	Glue	Alexis Dos Santos	
2007	XXY	Lucía Puenzo	
2007	In the City of Sylvia	José Luis Guerín	
2008	Somers Town	Shane Meadows	
2009	The Milk of Sorrow	Claudia Llosa	
2010	The Infidel	Josh Appignanesi	
2013	Chinese Puzzle	Cédric Klapisch	
2014	The Rover	David Michôd	
2016	The Neon Demon	Nicolas Winding Refn	
2018	Gloria Bell	Sebastián Lelio	
2019	Honey Boy	Alma Har'el	
2022	She Said	Maria Schrader	
2024	Norbert	José Corral Llorente	With Chema Hernández
2026	I Love Boosters	Boots Riley	

Documentary film

Year	Title	Director
2008	Dolce Vita Africana	Cosima Spender
2016	Science of Compassion	Shekhar Kapur

=== Television ===
Year	Title	Director	Notes
2011	Fronteras	Claudia Llosa	Segment Loxoro
2019	Foodie Love	Isabel Coixet	Episodes "Solo un café" and "Breakfast in Kentucky"
2022	American Gigolo	David Hollander	Episode "Pilot"; Also directed episode "Sunday Girl"

== Awards and nominations ==
Year	Body	Award	Title	Result	Ref.
2009	Manaki Brothers Film Festival	Golden Camera 300	The Milk of Sorrow	Won	
2017	Robert Awards	Best Cinematography	The Neon Demon	Won	
2019	Sundance Film Festival	Special Jury Award for Vision and Craft	Honey Boy	Won	
