= Bolo-Fouta =

- Commune
- Location in Mali
- Coordinates: 11°9′2″N 7°48′20″W
- Country: Mali
- Region: Sikasso Region
- Cercle: Yanfolila Cercle

Area
  - Total: 171 km^{2} (66 sq mi)

Population (2009 census)
  - Total: 4,413
  - Density: 25.8/km^{2} (66.8/sq mi)
- Time zone: UTC+0 (GMT)

Bolo-Fouta is a rural commune in the Cercle of Yanfolila in the Sikasso Region of southern Mali. The commune covers an area of 171 square kilometers and includes 4 villages. In the 2009 census it had a population of 4,413. The village of Doussoudiana, the administrative center (chef-lieu) of the commune, is 38 km east of Yanfolila.
