= Gouandiaka =

- Commune
- Location in Mali
- Coordinates: 10°47′10″N 8°11′30″W
- Country: Mali
- Region: Sikasso Region
- Cercle: Yanfolila Cercle
- Admin HQ (Chef-lieu): Kalana

Area
  - Total: 1,169 km^{2} (451 sq mi)

Population (2009 census)
  - Total: 26,287
  - Density: 22.49/km^{2} (58.24/sq mi)
- Time zone: UTC+0 (GMT)

Gouandiaka is a rural commune in the Cercle of Yanfolila in the Sikasso Region of southern Mali. The commune covers an area of 1,169 square kilometers and includes 29 villages. In the 2009 census it had a population of 26,287. The village of Kalana, the administrative center (chef-lieu) of the commune, is 44 km south of Yanfolila.
