= Séré Moussa Ani Samou =

- Commune
- Location in Mali
- Coordinates: 11°19′23″N 8°15′44″W
- Country: Mali
- Region: Sikasso Region
- Cercle: Yanfolila Cercle

Area
  - Total: 552 km^{2} (213 sq mi)

Population (2009 census)
  - Total: 18,088
  - Density: 32.8/km^{2} (84.9/sq mi)
- Time zone: UTC+0 (GMT)

Séré Moussa Ani Samou is a rural commune in the Cercle of Yanfolila in the Sikasso Region of southern Mali. The commune covers an area of 552 square kilometers and includes 15 villages. In the 2009 census it had a population of 18,088. The village of Siékorolé, the administrative center (chef-lieu) of the commune, is 20 km northwest of Yanfolila.
