= Kalana, Mali =

Kalana
- Village
- Location in Mali
- Coordinates: 10°47′10″N 8°11′30″W
- Country: Mali
- Region: Sikasso Region
- Cercle: Yanfolila Cercle
- Commune: Gouandiaka
- Time zone: UTC+0 (GMT)

Kalana is a village and seat of the commune of Gouandiaka in the Cercle of Yanfolila in the Sikasso Region of southern Mali. It is 44 km south of Yanfolila.
