= Elizabeth Spender =

Film actress (born 1950)

- Born: 1950 (age 75–76)
- Occupation: Actress
- Spouse: Barry Humphries (m. 1990; died 2023)
- Parent(s): Stephen Spender; Natasha Spender
- Relatives: Matthew Spender (brother)

Elizabeth Spender (born 1950) is a film and television actress known for her role in Brazil.

== Early life and education ==
Spender is the daughter of concert pianist Natasha Spender (née Litvin) and the poet, novelist and essayist Stephen Spender. She studied drama at the Bristol Old Vic Theatre School and Drama Centre London. She also attended an Arvon Foundation television play-writing course which was taught by Jack Rosenthal.

== Career ==
Among numerous television and film credits, she appeared in Terry Gilliam's 1985 cult film Brazil.

She has written two BBC TV dramas: Hedgehog Wedding (1987) produced by Innes Lloyd, and These Foolish Things (1989) which starred Lindsay Duncan. In the 1990s she wrote a series of Pastability cookbooks. In 2005 she published a memoir of her childhood, The Wild Horse Diaries (ISBN 9780733619755).

== Personal life ==
From 1990 until his death in 2023, she was married to the Australian actor and satirist Barry Humphries. They had met at a Groucho Club party in 1988.

== Filmography ==
=== Film ===
Year	Title	Role	Notes
1981	Priest of Love	Elsa Weekley	
1985	Brazil	Alison / 'Barbara' Lint	
1987	The Felons	Florence	
1996	The Leading Man	Anne	

=== Television ===
Year	Title	Role	Notes
1973	Frankenstein: The True Story	Ballroom Guest	Television film
1979	Feet First	Fay Faith	Episode #1.3
1979	Premiere	Trudi	Episode: "Over There"
1979	Testament of Youth	Christina	Episode: "1918"
1980	The Professionals	Helen Tippett	Episode: "Blood Sports"
1980	BBC2 Playhouse	Constance	Episode: "The Happy Autumn Fields"
1981	Something in Disguise	Annabel	Episode: "A New Life"
1982	Nancy Astor	Henrietta	Episode: "Scandals"
1984	Oxbridge Blues	Girl at party	Episode: "The Muse"
1984	The Secret Servant	Melinda Fay	2 episodes
1984	Talk to Me	Kate	Television film
1986	ScreenPlay	Magdalena Hofdemel	Episode: "The Mozart Inquest"
1988	Sherlock Holmes	Laura Lyons	Episode: "The Hound of the Baskervilles"
1991	Selling Hitler	Valkyrie / Marlene	4 episodes
1998–1999	Fast Tracks	Judy Brumfield	3 episodes
2023	Barry Humphries: A Tribute	—N/a	Television special
