= Tigerlily Films =

Tigerlily Films is a British film and television production company established in 2000, working in documentary, drama, feature films and branded content. Their feature film credits include The Market: A Tale of Trade (Winner of Best Film at Antalya Golden Orange Film Festival in 2008), She, A Chinese (winner of the Locarno Golden Leopard in 2009), Transit and Jadoo, and their documentaries include After the Apocalypse, Only When I Dance, Black Power Salute, 37 Uses For a Dead Sheep and Dolce Vita Africana.

== Company ==
Tigerlily Films was established by co-managing directors Natasha Dack and Nikki Parrott, who first met when students at the Royal College of Art Film School. After producing many music videos, commercials, TV channel idents and short films through their sister company, UFO Films, Tigerlily Films was created to concentrate on documentaries and dramas.

In 2001, Tigerlily Films was awarded a slate deal with the UK Film Council. In 2006 Tigerlily was awarded a MEDIA slate deal for documentaries, which was renewed for a further slate in 2008.

The company has produced several documentaries for BBC Four’s Storyville series, including Footprints, 37 Uses For a Dead Sheep and Dolce Vita Africana, a documentary about Malian photographer Malick Sidibe.

Tigerlily also produces branded content, idents and commercials. Previous work includes Honda idents for Channel 4, Sci-Fi Channel idents, branded content films for Sony Creatology and for Rexona/Lotus F1.

== Filmography ==
- Jadoo (2013) - Co-production Company
- Home Sweet Home (2012/III) - Co-production Company
- "My Life: My Birthday Shook the World (#3.6)" (2012) - Production Company
- Apples (2012) - Production Company
- Wham! Bam! Islam! (2011) - Co-production Company
- “Random Acts: Lemn Sissay: Elephant in the Room” (2011) - Production Company
- “Random Acts: Lemn Sissay: Applecart Art” (2011) - Production Company
- “Random Acts: Lemn Sissay: Torch” (2011) - Production Company
- “Random Acts: Lemn Sissay: Speed” (2011) - Production Company
- “Random Acts: Lemn Sissay: Architecture” (2011) - Production Company
- After the Apocalypse (2010) - Production Company
- She, a Chinese (2009) - Production Company (production)
- Only When I Dance (2009) - Production Company
- The Market: A Tale of Trade (2008) - Production Company
- Black Power Salute (2008) (TV) - Production Company
- Dolce vita africana (2008) - Production Company
- Goth Cruise (2008) - Production Company
- “3 Minute Wonder: Night Haunts: Midnight Pilgrims – Tyburn Convent" (2008) - Production Company
- “3 Minute Wonder: Night Haunts: Night Cleaners" (2008) - Production Company
- “3 Minute Wonder: Night Haunts: Thames Barger" (2008) - Production Company
- “3 Minute Wonder: Night Haunts: Sleep Clinic" (2008) - Production Company
- "3 Minute Wonder: Bravo!: Happy Birthday Bra" (2007) - Production Company
- "3 Minute Wonder: Bravo!: Me, My Bra and I" (2007) - Production Company
- "3 Minute Wonder: Bravo!: The Liberators" (2007) - Production Company
- "3 Minute Wonder: Bravo!: The Bra Lady" (2007) - Production Company
- “3 Minute Wonder: Making Waves: Liverpool Unzipped” (2007) - Production Company
- “3 Minute Wonder: Making Waves: Open Line” (2007) - Production Company
- “3 Minute Wonder: Making Waves: Mick & Clive” (2007) - Production Company
- “3 Minute Wonder: Making Waves: Igor” (2007) - Production Company
- Alexis Arquette: She's My Brother (2007) - Production Company
- Weddings and Beheadings (2007) - Production Company
- 37 Uses for a Dead Sheep (2006) - Production Company
- Transit (2005) (TV) - Production Company
- "Patrick's Planet" (2005) - Production Company
- Gyppo (2004) - Production Company
- Footprints (2003) (TV) - Production Company
- First Communion Day (2002) (TV) - Production Company
- Lambeth Marsh (2000) - Production Company
- The Elevator (2000) - Production Company
- Electric Frank (1998) - Production Company
- Anthrakitis (1998) - Production Company
- Romeo Thinks Again (1998) - Production Company
