= Djiguiya de Koloni =

- Commune
- Location in Mali
- Coordinates: 11°2′22″N 7°45′40″W
- Country: Mali
- Region: Sikasso Region
- Cercle: Yanfolila Cercle

Area
  - Total: 559 km^{2} (216 sq mi)

Population (2009 census)
  - Total: 6,857
  - Density: 12.3/km^{2} (31.8/sq mi)
- Time zone: UTC+0 (GMT)

Djiguiya de Koloni is a rural commune in the Cercle of Yanfolila in the Sikasso Region of southern Mali. The commune covers an area of 559 square kilometers and includes 9 villages. In the 2009 census it had a population of 6,857. The village of Koloni, the administrative center (chef-lieu) of the commune, is 46 km southeast of Yanfolila.
