= Yorobougoula =

- Village
- Location in Mali
- Coordinates: 10°54′45″N 8°0′0″W
- Country: Mali
- Region: Sikasso Region
- Cercle: Yanfolila Cercle
- Commune: Gouanan
- Time zone: UTC+0 (GMT)

Yorobougoula is a village and seat of the commune of Gouanan in the Cercle of Yanfolila in the Sikasso Region of southern Mali.
