= Doussoudiana =

- Village
- Location in Mali
- Coordinates: 11°9′2″N 7°48′20″W
- Country: Mali
- Region: Sikasso Region
- Cercle: Yanfolila Cercle
- Commune: Bolo-Fouta
- Time zone: UTC+0 (GMT)

Doussoudiana is a village and seat of the commune of Bolo-Fouta in the Cercle of Yanfolila in the Sikasso Region of southern Mali.
