= Malick Sidibé =

Malian photographer (1935–2016)

- Born: 1935; Soloba, Mali
- Died: 14 April 2016 (aged 80–81); Bamako, Mali
- Citizenship: Mali
- Education: Institut National des Arts de Bamako
- Occupation: Photographer
- Awards: Hasselblad Award; Golden Lion for Lifetime Achievement

Malick Sidibé (1935 – 14 April 2016) was a Malian photographer from a Fulani (Fula) village in Soloba, who was noted for his black-and-white studies of popular culture in the 1960s in Bamako, Mali. Sidibé had a long and fruitful career as a photographer in Bamako, and was a well-known figure in his community. In 1994, he had his first exhibition outside of Mali and received much critical praise for his carefully composed portraits. Sidibé's work has since become well known and renowned on a global scale. His work was the subject of a number of publications and exhibited throughout Europe and the United States. In 2007, he received a Golden Lion for Lifetime Achievement at the Venice Biennale, becoming both the first photographer and the first African so recognized. Other awards he has received include a Hasselblad Award for photography in 2003, an International Center of Photography Infinity Award for Lifetime Achievement (2008), and a World Press Photo award (2010).

Sidibé's work is held in the collections of The Contemporary African Art Collection (CAAC), the J. Paul Getty Museum in Los Angeles, and the Museum of Modern Art in New York City.

== Life and work ==
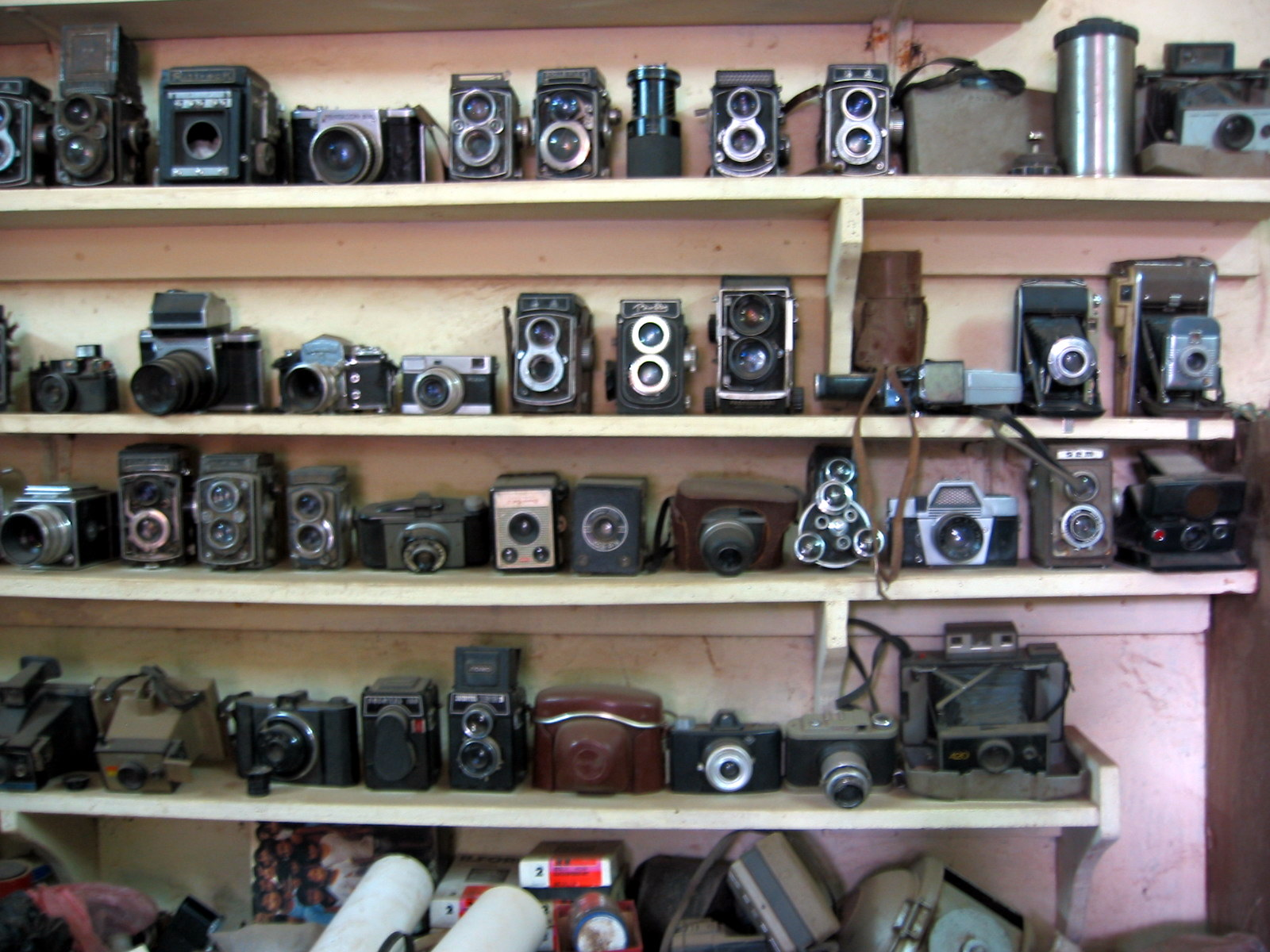
Sidibé's studio in Bamako, showing his cameras and equipment

Sidibé was born in the village of Soloba, 300 km from Bamako, in Mali. His father, Kolo Barry Sidibé, was a Fula stock breeder, farmer, and skilled hunter. Malick's father had wanted him to attend school, but passed before he was able to attend at the age of 16. In 1955, photographer Gérard Guillat came to the school looking for a student to decorate his studio, eventually hiring Sidibé. Guillat was impressed with his work and took him on as an apprentice. Sidibé's first tasks included calibrating equipment, and delivering prints. He soon learned more about photography as he assisted Guillat, and eventually took on his own clients. In 1957, Guillat closed his studio, and Sidibé began taking photographs of Bamako nightlife. He specialized in documentary photography, focusing particularly on the youth culture of the Malian capital. Sidibé took photographs at sport events, the beach, nightclubs, concerts, and even tagged along while the young men seduced girls. He increasingly became noted for his black-and-white studies of popular culture in the 1960s in Bamako. In the 1970s, Sidibé turned towards the making of studio portraits. His background in drawing became useful:

As a rule, when I was working in the studio, I did a lot of the positioning. As I have a background in drawing, I was able to set up certain positions in my portraits. I didn't want my subjects to look like mummies. I would give them positions that brought something alive in them.

In 1962, Sidibé opened his own studio in the Bagadadji neighborhood of Bamako. Sidibé continued to take photos of the surprise parties and club gatherings of the city until 1976. He attributed ending his career in reportagé to fewer club parties, rise in availability of affordable cameras, and the growth of the auto-lab film development industry. Sidibé continued to shoot black and white studio portraits, ID photos, and fix broken cameras at his Bamako studio. While Sidibé was locally famous for decades, he was not introduced into the Western fine art world until 1994 when he had a chance encounter with French curator André Magnin. One of the best known of Sidibé's works from that time is Nuit de Noel, Happy Club (Christmas Eve, Happy Club) (1963), depicting a smiling couple – the man in a suit, the woman in a Western party dress (but barefoot) and both dancing, presumably, to music. And it was images like these that revealed how Sidibé's photographic style was inextricably linked to music. This connection is something that Sidibé had spoken about during interviews, over the years.

"We were entering a new era, and people wanted to dance. Music freed us. Suddenly, young men could get close to young women, hold them in their hands. Before, it was not allowed. And everyone wanted to be photographed dancing up close."

It is perhaps no surprise that other Malian artists, such as the musicians Salif Keita and Ali Farka Touré, also came to international attention in the 1990s at almost the same moment as Malian photography was being recognized.

"Throughout the 1960s and '70s, in graphic, vigorous, black-and-white pictures, Sidibé captured the dynamism and joy of a rapidly changing West Africa. In particular, he honed in on the vernaculars of style: the brash suits, the purposefully clashing prints, the girls pairing their headdresses with their cat-eye shades, the little kids in full tribal costume and face paint, the dancers kicking off their shoes. The party, the club, the dance floor—these were his settings, the places where people came to be seen and dressed the part. From midnight till dawn, Sidibé roamed the city, party-hopping, shooting hundreds of frames every weekend."

Sidibé used flash when out in the field, but only tungsten lighting in the studio. He used an Agfa 6 × 6 camera with bellows to shoot weddings and more formal events, and a Foca Sport 24 x 36 for his more candid work. He was known as a very charming person and would tell his clients jokes to put them at ease while shooting portraits. The Grammy award-winning video of Janet Jackson's 1997 song "Got 'til It's Gone" is strongly indebted to the photographic style of Sidibé, and the video pays tribute to a particular time (during the 1960s and '70s) that Sidibé's pictures had helped to document. This was the time period just after the French Sudan (and then the Mali Federation) had gained Independence from France in 1960. This new era (post-1960) has, subsequently, been characterized by various observers as a post-colonial (and post-apartheid) awakening of consciousness. Many of those who admire Sidibé's work believe that he somehow captured the joy and wonder of this awakening, and that it is seen in the faces, scenes, and images that he helped to illuminate. More recently, Sidibé's influence can be seen directly through Inna Modja's 2015 video for her song "Tombouctou", as it was filmed in Sidibé's photography studio.

In 2006, Tigerlily Films made a documentary entitled Dolce Vita Africana about Sidibé, filming him at work in his studio in Bamako, having a reunion with many of his friends (and former photographic subjects) from his younger days, and speaking to him about his work.

Sidibé became the first African and the first photographer to be awarded the Golden Lion for Lifetime Achievement at the Venice Biennale in 2007. Robert Storr, the show's artistic director, said:

No African artist has done more to enhance photography's stature in the region, contribute to its history, enrich its image archive or increase our awareness of the textures and transformations of African culture in the second half of the 20th century and the beginning of the 21st than Malick Sidibé.

Sidibé died of complications from diabetes in Bamako. He was survived by 17 children and three wives.

Sidibé's work was included in the 2025 exhibition Photography and the Black Arts Movement, 1955–1985 at the National Gallery of Art.

== Publications ==
=== Publications by Sidibé ===
- Malick Sidibé. Zurich; New York: Scalo, 1998. ISBN 9783931141936. Edited by André Magnin. With an introduction by Magnin, and essays by Sibidé ("Studio Malick"), Youssouf Doumbia, ("Ambiance totale avec Garrincha!"), Panka Dembelé ("Twist again!"), and Boubacar "Kar Kar" Traoré ("Elvis est vivant!"). Included a four-song music CD by Kar Kar.
- Malick Sidibé, Photographe: "vues de dos" photographies. Carnets de la création, Mali. Montreal: Editions de l'oeil, 2001. ISBN 9782912415189. With a text by Amadou Chab Touré. 24 pages.
- Malick Sidibe: Photographs: the Hasselblad Award 2003. Göteborg, Sweden: Hasselblad Center; Göttingen: Steidl, 2003. ISBN 9783882439731. With a foreword by Gunilla Knape, an essay by Manthia Diawara, "The 1960s in Bamako: Malick Sidibé and James Brown", and a transcript of an interview with Sidibé by André Magnin. Published on the occasion of the exhibition Malick Sidibé: 2003 Hasselblad Award Winner held at the Hasselblad Center, Göteborg, Sweden, 2003.
- Malick Sidibé: Chemises. Göttingen: Steidl, 2007. ISBN 9783865215239. Catalog of an exhibition presented at Foam Fotografiemuseum Amsterdam and at Musée Nicệphore Niépce, Chalon-sur-Saône.
- Malick Sidibe. Wilsele, Belgium: Exhibitions International, 2008. By Foundation Zinsou. ISBN 978-9057791048.
- Bagadadji. Saint-Brieuc, France: GwinZegal, 2008. ISBN 9782952809924. With an essay by Florian Ebner, "La scène de Bagadadji". Portraits of the inhabitants of Bagadadji, Bamako, taken between 1964 and 1976.
  - English-language version.
  - French-language version.
  - German-language version.
- Perception. Saint-Brieuc, France: GwinZegal, 2008. ISBN 9782952809955. In French. Studio portraits made in Brittany, France, over the course of three weeks in July 2006.
- Malick Sidibé: La Vie en Rose. Milan: Silvana, 2010. Edited and with text by Laura Incardona and Laura Serani. ISBN 978-8836617166.
- Malick Sidibé: The Portrait of Mali (Sinetica Landscape). Milan: Skira, 2011. Edited by Laura Incardona, Laura Serani, and Sabrina Zannier. ISBN 978-8857211251. Text in English, French and Italian.
- Malick Sidibé: Au village. Montreuil, France: Éditions de L'Œil, 2011. ISBN 978-2351371329. Text by Brigitte Ollier. Studio portraits taken in Sidibé's native village of Soloba over the course of 50 years. In French.
- Malick Sidibé. fr:Photo Poche No. 145. Arles, France: fr:Actes Sud, 2013. ISBN 978-2-330-01229-8. With an introduction by Laura Serani.

=== Publications with contributions by Sidibé ===
- Photographes de Bamako: de 1935 à nos jours. Collection Soleil. Paris: Revue Noire, 1989. ISBN 978-2909571218. Photographs by Sidibé, Mountaga Dembélé, Seydou Keïta, Félix Diallo, Sakaly, AMAP, Alioune Bâ, Emmanuel Daou, Abdourahmane Sakaly, and others. With a text by Érika Nimis. In French and English.
- In/sight: African Photographers, 1940 to the Present. New York: Solomon R. Guggenheim Museum, 1996. ISBN 9780810968950. With an introduction by Clare Bell and essays by Okwui Enwezor, Olu Oguibe, and Octavio Zaya. Photographs by Sidibé, Cornélius Yao Azaglo Augustt, Oladélé Ajiboyé Bamgboyé, Zarina Bhimji, Gordon Bleach, Nabil Boutros, Cloete Breytenbach, Salla Casset, Mody Sory Diallo, Mohammed Dib, Kamel Dridi, Touhami Ennadre, Mathew Faji, Rotimi Fani-Kayode, Samuel Fosso, Jellel Gasteli, Meïssa Gaye, Christian Gbagbo, David Goldblatt, Bob Gosani, Ranjith Kally, Seydou Keita, Peter Magubane, Santu Mofokeng, G. R. Naidoo, Lamia Naji, Gopal Naransamy, Lionel Oostendorp, Ricardo Rangel, and Iké Udé. Catalogue of an exhibition held at the Solomon R. Guggenheim Museum, May–September 1996.
- Clubs of Bamako: 9 March-16 April 2000. Houston, TX: Rice University Art Gallery, 2000. OCLC 45496053. Photographs by Sidibé, Emile Guebehi, Koffi Kouakou, and Coulibaly Siaka Paul. Catalogue of an exhibition.
- You Look Beautiful Like That: The Portrait – Photographs of Seydou Keita and Malick Sidibe. New Haven, CT: Yale University Press, 2001. ISBN 978-0300091885. Edited by Michelle Lamuniere.
- Samuel Fosso, Seydou Keïta, Malick Sidibé: Portraits of Pride: West African Portrait Photography. Katalog / Moderna Museet 318. Stockholm: Moderna Museet; Raster-Förl, 2002. ISBN 978-9171006776. Photographs by Sibidé, Samuel Fosso, and Seydou Keïta. Catalogue of an exhibition held at Moderna Museet, Stockholm, September–October 2002; Norskt Fotomuseum, March–April 2003. In Swedish and English.
- African Art Now: Masterpieces From the Jean Pigozzi Collection. London; New York: Merrell, 2005. ISBN 978-0890902950. By André Magnin, Alison de Lima Greene, Alvia J. Wardlaw, and Thomas McEvilley. Paintings, photographs, sculpture and installation art by 33 artists. Catalogue of an exhibition of work from The Contemporary African Art Collection held at Museum of Fine Arts, Houston.
- The Poetics of Cloth: African Textiles, Recent Art. New York: Grey Art Gallery, New York University, 2008. ISBN 9780615220833. Edited by Lynn Gumpert. With essays by Kofi Anyidoho, Lynn Gumpert, and John Picton, and contributions by Jennifer S. Brown, Lydie Diakhaté, Janet Goldner, Lynn Gumpert, John Picton, and Doran H. Ross. Reproductions of paintings, sculptures, videos and photographs by Sidibé, El Anatsui, Samuel Cophis, Viye Diba, Sokari Douglas Camp, Groupe Bogolan Kasobane, Abdoulaye Konaté, Rachid Koraïchi, Atta Kwami, Grace Ndiritu, Nike Okundaye, Owusu-Ankomah, Yinka Shonibare, Nontsikelelo "Lolo" Veleko, Rikki Wemega-Kwawu, and Sue Williamson. "Published on the occasion of an exhibition held at Grey Art Gallery, Sept. 16–Dec. 6, 2008."
- Events of the Self: Portraiture and Social Identity: Contemporary African Photography from the Walther Collection. Burlafingen, Germany: The Walther Collection; Göttingen, Germany: Steidl, 2010. ISBN 9783869301570. Edited by Okwui Enwezor. With texts by Willis E. Hartshorn and Artur Walther, Okwui Enwezor, Gabriele Conrath-Scholl, Virginia Heckert, Chika Okeke-Agulu, Deborah Willis ("Malick Sidibé': the front of the back view"), Santu Mofokeng, and Kobena Mercer. Photographs by Sibidé, Sammy Baloji, Oladélé Ajiboyé Bamgboyé, Yto Barrada, Bernd and Hilla Becher, Candice Breitz, Allan deSouza, Theo Eshetu, Rotimi Fani-Kayode, Samuel Fosso, David Goldblatt, Kay Hassan, Romuald Hazoumè, Pieter Hugo, Seydou Keïta, Maha Maamoun, Boubacar Touré Mandémory, Salem Mekuria, Santu Mofokeng, Zwelethu Mthethwa, Zanele Muholi, James Muriuku, Ingrid Mwangi, Grace Ndiritu, J.D. 'Okhai Ojeikere, Jo Ractliffe, August Sander, Berni Searle, Mikhael Subotzky, Guy Tillim, Hentie van der Merwe, and Nontsikelelo Veleko. In English with German translation. Published to accompany an exhibition in Burlafingen, Germany, June 2010.
- Everything was Moving: Photography from the 60s and 70s. London: Barbican Art Gallery, 2012. ISBN 9780946372393. Edited by Kate Bush and Gerry Badger. With texts by Bush ("Everything was moving"), Badger ("Spirit of the times, spirit of place: a view of photography in the 1960s and 1970s"), Gavin Jantjes ("Ernest Cole"), Sean O'Hagan ("The unreal everyday: William Eggleston's America" and "Against detachment: Bruce Davidson's photographs of America during the Civil Rights Era"), Tanya Barson ("Graciela Iturbide: a matter of complicity"), T. J. Demos ("On Sigmar Polke's Der Bärenkampf"), Helen Petrovsky ("Boris Mikhailov: towards a new universality"), Boris Mikhailov ("Yesterday's sandwich"), Ian Jeffrey ("Shomei Tomatsu"), Julian Stallabrass ("Rather a hawk?: the photography of Larry Burrows"), Robert Pledge ("Li Zhensheng: the cinematographer behind the photographer"), Manthia Diawara ("The sixties in Bamako: Malick Sidibé and James Brown"), Shanay Jhaveri ("Raghubir Singh and the geographical culture of India"), and Raghubir Singh ("River of colour: an Indian view"). Photographs by Sidibé, David Goldblatt, Ernest Cole, William Eggleston, Bruce Davidson, Graciela Iturbide, Sigmar Polke, Boris Mikhailov, Shomei Tomatsu, Larry Burrows, Li Zhensheng, and Raghubir Singh. Published on the occasion of the exhibition Everything was Moving: Photography from the 60s and 70s, curated by Kate Bush, September 2012–January 2013 at Barbican Art Gallery, Barbican Centre, London.
- Malian Portrait Photography. New Platz, New York: Samuel Dorsky Museum of Art, 2013. ISBN 9780615510941. Photographs by Sidibé and Seydou Keïta, El Hadj Hamidou Maïga, Abdourahmane Sakaly, and El Hadj Tijani Àdìgún Sitou. With text by Daniel Leers. "Published on the occasion of the exhibition Malian Portrait Photography on display from January 23–April 14, 2013, in the North Gallery of the Samuel Dorsky Museum of Art at the State University of New York at New Paltz."
- Afriphoto II. Collection Afriphoto, Vols 5–8. Trézélan: Filigranes, 2005. ISBN 9782350460079. Vol. 5 is by Sidibé, vol. 6 is by Bill Akwa Bétotè, vol. 7 is by Omar D, and vol. 8 is by Fouad Hamza Tibin and Mohamed Yahia Issa. Edited by Corinne Julien. With texts by Guy Hersant, Jacques Matinet, and Claude Iverné. In French.

=== Publications about Sidibé ===
- Retrats de l'Anima: Fotografia Africana. Barcelona: La Caixa Foundation, 1997. OCLC 50666491. By Sélim Benattiam, Cristina de Borbón, and Rosa Casamada. In Catalan and English. An exhibition catalogue. With a contribution by Mounira Khemir, "De una Punta a otra de Africa. Impresionas Fotograficas".
- The 1960s in Bamako: Malick Sidibé and James Brown. Paper Series on the Arts, Culture, and Society, Paper No. 11. By Manthia Diawara. New York: Andy Warhol Foundation for the Visual Arts, 2001. OCLC 47999579. About Sidibé and James Brown. (Note: The text can be read here within the Andy Warhol Foundation for the Visual Arts website.)
- Black Renaissance/Renaissance Noire, Vol. 4, No. 2/3. New York: New York University, 2002. Included an essay by Manthia Diawara, The 1960s in Bamako: Malick Sidibé and James Brown.
- Black Cultural Traffic: Crossroads in Global Performance and Popular Culture. Ann Arbor: University of Michigan, 2005. Edited by Harry J. Elam Jr., and Kennell Jackson Jr. ISBN 9780472025459. Includes a chapter by Manthia Diawara, "The 1960s in Bamako: Malick Sidibé and James Brown".

== Awards ==
- 2003: Hasselblad Award for photography
- 2007: Golden Lion for Lifetime Achievement, Venice Biennale
- 2008: Infinity Award for Lifetime Achievement, International Center of Photography (ICP), New York
- 2010: World Press Photo award – first prize singles, Arts and Entertainment

== Collections ==
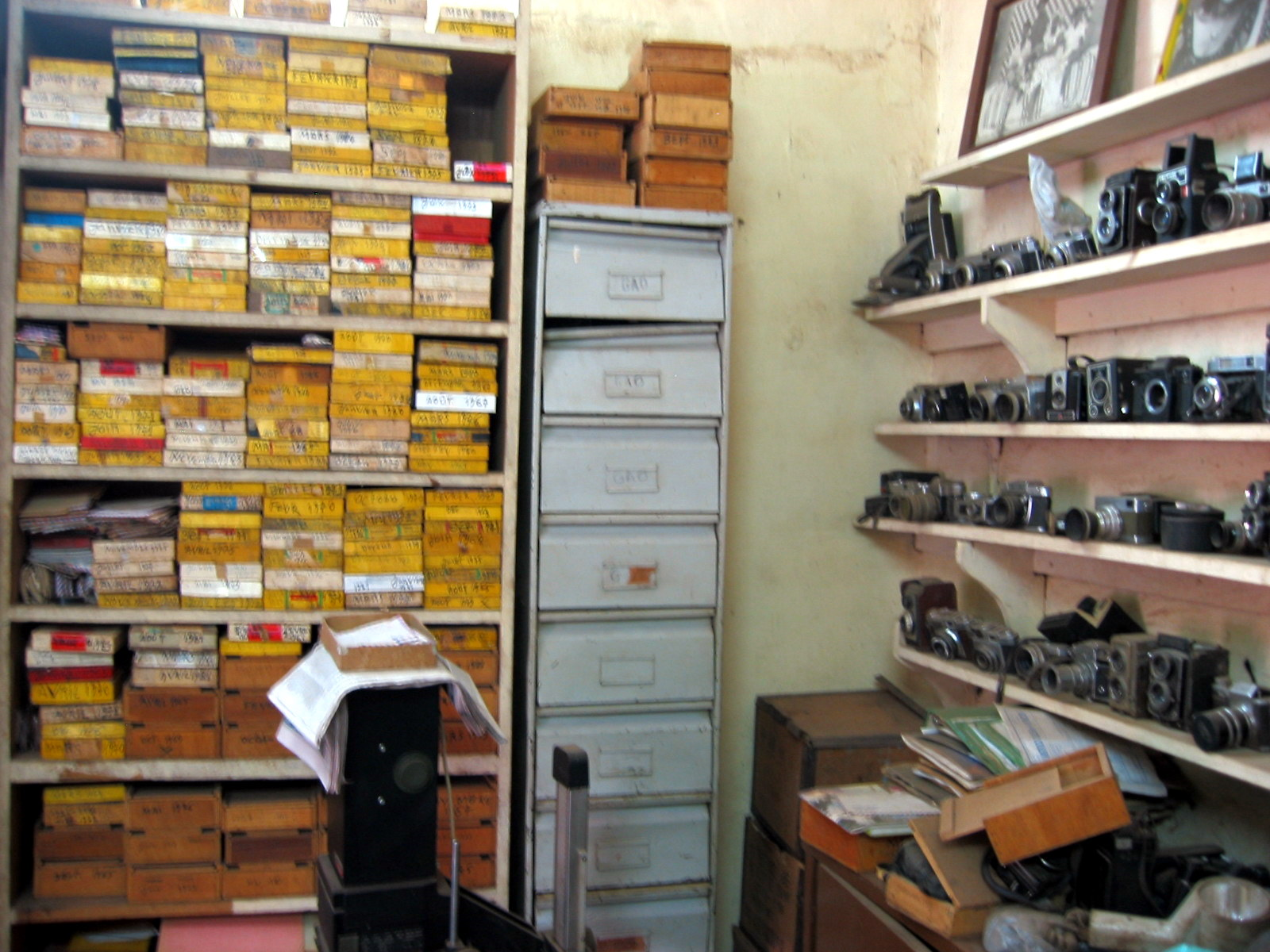
Sidibé's negative collection, in his studio in Bamako

Sidibé's work is held in the following public collections:

- The Art Institute of Chicago, Chicago, Illinois
- The Contemporary African Art Collection (CAAC) of Jean Pigozzi, Geneva
- J. Paul Getty Museum, Los Angeles, CA
- Museum of Modern Art, New York
- Metropolitan Museum of Art, New York
- San Francisco Museum of Modern Art, San Francisco
- Baltimore Museum of Art, Baltimore, MD
- Birmingham Museum of Art, Birmingham, AL
- Studio Museum in Harlem (New York)
- High Museum of Art, Atlanta, GA
- International Center of Photography, New York
- Moderna Museet, Stockholm
- The Museum of Fine Arts, Houston, Houston, Texas

== Exhibitions ==
=== Solo exhibitions ===
- 1995: Malick Sidibé: Bamako 1962–1976, Fondation Cartier pour l'Art Contemporain, Paris
- 1999: Museum of Contemporary Art, Chicago, IL
- 1999: Malick Sidibé. Photographie, Dany Keller Galerie, Munich
- 1999: Cool Cats and Twist Club, Australian Centre for Photography, Sydney, Australia
- 2000: Centre d’Art Contemporain Genève, Geneva, Switzerland
- 2001: Galleria Nazionale d'Arte Moderna, Rome, Italy
- 2001: Stedelijk Museum Amsterdam, Netherlands
- 2002: HackelBury Fine Art Limited, London
- 2003: Hasselblad Center, Gothenburg Museum of Art, Gothenburg, Sweden
- 2004: CAV Coimbra Visual Arts Centre, Coimbra, Portugal
- 2004: Museet for Fotokunst, Brandts Klaedefabrik, Odense, Denmark
- 2005: Photographs: 1960–2004, Jack Shainman Gallery, New York, USA
- 2007: Malick Sidibé. C'est Pas Ma Faute, Musee des arts derniers, Paris
- 2007: Malick Sidibé. Los Sabena Club, Fifty One Fine Art Photography, Antwerp, Belgium
- 2008: Malick Sidibé. Chemises, Foam Fotografiemuseum Amsterdam, Amsterdam, Netherlands
- 2009: Malick Sidibé. Bamako Nights, Musée Nicéphore Niépce, Chalon sur Saône, France
- 2010: "Studio Malick", Tristan Hoare, London
- 2011: Malick Sidibé. The Eye of Bamako, M+B Gallery, Los Angeles, CA
- 2015: Studio Malick. Gares de Bretagne et Montparnasse, Frac Bretagne, Conseil régional and SNCF
- 2014: Malick Sidibé, Jack Shainman Gallery, New York, USA
- 2016: It's Too Funky in Here! By Malick Sidibé, FIFTY ONE TOO, Antwerp, Belgium
- 2017: Malick Sidibé. The Eye of Modern Mali, Somerset House, London His first solo exhibition in the UK.

=== Group exhibitions and festivals ===
- 1995: Seydou Keita & Malick Sidibe: Photographs From Mali, Fruitmarket Gallery, Edinburgh, Scotland
- 1996: Double vie, Double vue, Fondation Cartier pour l'art contemporain, Paris, France
- 1996: By Night, Fondation Cartier pour l'art contemporain, Paris, France
- 1999: 6th International İstanbul Biennial 1999, International Istanbul Biennial, Istanbul, Turkey
- 2000: Africa: Past-Present, Fifty One Fine Art Photography, Antwerp
- 2001–2003: You look beautiful like that: The Portrait of Photographs of Seydou Keïta and Malick Sidibé, Fogg Museum, Harvard Art Museums, Cambridge, MA; UCLA Hammer Museum, University of California, Los Angeles, USA; Norton Museum of Art, West Palm Beach FL; National Portrait Gallery, London; Williams College Museum of Art, Williamstown, Massachusetts, USA
- 2004: Photography: Inaugural Installation, Museum of Modern Art (MoMA), New York, USA
- 2004: Seeds and Roots, The Studio Museum in Harlem, New York, USA
- 2005: African Art Now – Masterpieces from the Jean Pigozzi Collection, National Museum of African Art, Washington, USA
- 2007: Why Africa? The work of 13 photographers including Sidibé, Frédéric Bruly Bouabré, Bodys Isek Kingelez, Chéri Samba, Makonde Lilanga, and Keita Seydou, Pinacoteca Giovanni e Marella Agnelli, Turin, Italy.
- 2009: Masters of Photography, Fifty One Fine Art Photography, Antwerp, Belgium
- 2009: Some Tribes, Christophe Guye Galerie, Zurich, Switzerland
- 2010: Posing Beauty in African American Culture, Art Gallery of Hamilton, Hamilton, USA
- 2010: Un Rêve Utile: Photographie Africaine 1960–2010, BOZAR – Palais des Beaux-Arts, Brussels
- 2010: Represent: Imaging African American Culture in Contemporary Art, Hagedorn Foundation Gallery, Atlanta, USA
- 2010: African Stories, Marrakech Art Fair, Marrakech
- 2011: Paris Photo, Grand Palais, The Walther Collection
- 2012: Afrika, hin und zurück, Museum Folkwang, Essen
- 2012: Gaze – The Changing Face of Portrait Photography, Istanbul Modern, Istanbul, Turkey
- 2012: Everything Was Moving: Photography from the 60s and 70s, Barbican Centre,
- 2014: Back to Front, Mariane Ibrahim Gallery, Seattle, USA
- 2014: Ici l'Afrique, Château de Penthes, Pregny-Chambésy, France
- 2015: The Pistil's waitz, Gallery Fifty One, Antwerp, Belgium
- 2015: Making Africa. Un Continente De Diseño Contemporáneo, Guggenheim Museum Bilbao, Bilbao, Spain
- 2016: VIVRE !!, Cité nationale de l'histoire de l'immigration, Paris, France
- 2016: Regarding Africa: Contemporary Art and Afro-Futurism, Tel Aviv Museum of Art, Tel Aviv, Israel
- 2017: Back Stories, Mariane Ibrahim Gallery, Seattle, USA
- 2017: Il Cacciatore Bianco / The White Hunter, FM Centro per l'Arte Contemporanea, Milan, Italy
- 2017: Rhona Hoffman. 40 Years: Part 3. Political, Rhona Hoffman Gallery, Chicago, USA
- 2020: Through an African Lens: Sub-Saharan Photography from the Museum's Collections, The Museum of Fine Arts, Houston, Houston, Texas

== Film and television appearances ==
- Malick Sidibé: portrait of the artist as a portraitist (2006). OCLC 68907552. Directed by Susan Vogel for the National Museum of Mali / Prince Street Pictures. Produced by Vogel, Samuel Sidbe, and Catherine de Clippel. Interview with Sidibé by Jean-Paul Colleyn. In French with English subtitles.
- Dolce Vita Africana (2008, Tigerlily Films). 62 mins. Directed by Cosima Spender. Produced by Natasha Dack, Nikki Parrott, and Spender. A documentary about Sidibé, and about Malian history as told through people he photographed. In Bamanankan and French. The film was shown as part of BBC4's Storyville series in March 2008.
- Malick Sidibé, le Partage (2013, P.O.M. Films; Éditions de L'Œil, ADAV). 52 mins. DVD and brochure. Film by Thomas Glaser, text by Gaël Teicher. ISBN 9782351371558. The film is in French with French and English subtitles, and the text is in French.
