= Gouanan =

- Commune
- Location in Mali
- Coordinates: 10°54′45″N 8°0′0″W
- Country: Mali
- Region: Sikasso Region
- Cercle: Yanfolila Cercle

Area
  - Total: 1,747 km^{2} (675 sq mi)

Population (2009 census)
  - Total: 24,704
  - Density: 14.14/km^{2} (36.62/sq mi)
- Time zone: UTC+0 (GMT)

Gouanan is a rural commune in the Cercle of Yanfolila in the Sikasso Region of southern Mali. The commune covers an area of 1747 square kilometers and includes 35 villages. In the 2009 census it had a population of 24,704. The village of Yorobougoula, the administrative center (chef-lieu) of the commune, is 34 km southeast of Yanfolila.

Gouanan was a jamana of Wassoulou made up of 55 villages.
