= Koussan =

- Commune
- Location in Mali
- Coordinates: 10°29′55″N 7°57′12″W
- Country: Mali
- Region: Sikasso Region
- Cercle: Yanfolila Cercle

Area
  - Total: 1,457 km^{2} (563 sq mi)

Population (2009 census)
  - Total: 10,178
  - Density: 6.986/km^{2} (18.09/sq mi)
- Time zone: UTC+0 (GMT)

Koussan is a rural commune in the Cercle of Yanfolila in the Sikasso Region of southern Mali. The commune covers an area of 1,457 square kilometers and includes 16 villages. In the 2009 census it had a population of 10,178. The village of Filamana, the administrative center (chef-lieu) of the commune, is 79 km south-southeast of Yanfolila.
