= David Levinthal =

American photographer

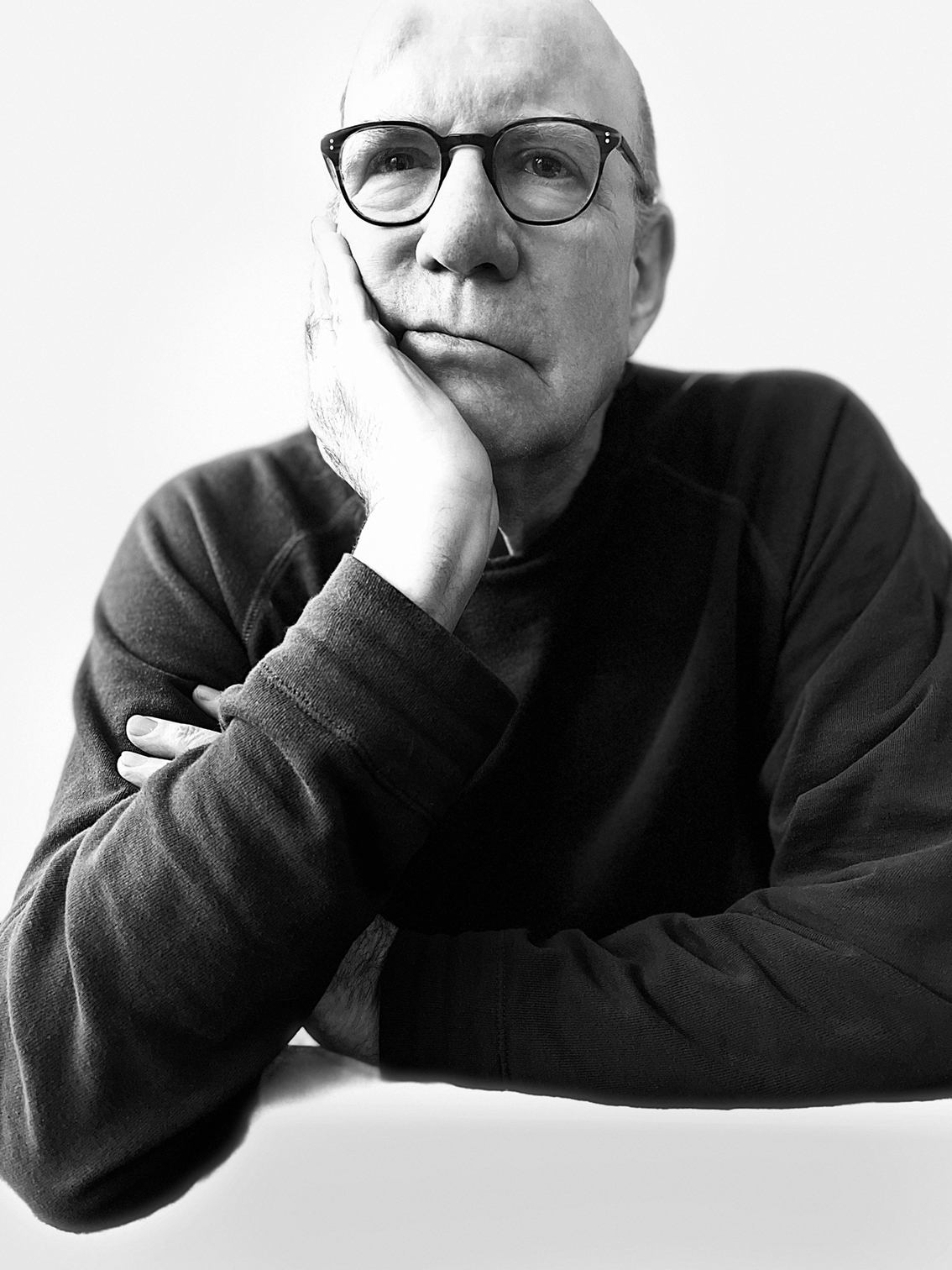
- Levinthal in 2024
- Born: March 8, 1949 (age 77); San Francisco, California, U.S.
- Education: Stanford University (BA); Yale University (MFA); Massachusetts Institute of Technology (MS)
- Known for: Photography
- Awards: Guggenheim Fellowship (1995), National Endowment for the Arts (1990–1991)
- Website: www.davidlevinthal.com

David Lawrence Levinthal (born March 8, 1949) is an American photographer who lives and works in New York City. He uses small toys and props with lighting to construct miniature environments for subject matters varying from war scenes, to voyeurism, to racial and political references, to American pop culture.

Levinthal's major series include Hitler Moves East (1972–1975), Modern Romance (1983–1985), Wild West (1986–1989), Desire (1991–1992), Blackface (1995–1998), Barbie (1997–1998), Baseball (1998–2004), History (2010–2018), and Vietnam (2018-2022).

== Career ==
Levinthal was born in 1949 in San Francisco, California. He received a Master of Science in Management Science from the MIT Sloan School of Management (1981), an MFA in Photography from Yale University (1973), and a BA in Studio Art from Stanford University (1970). He was the recipient of a Guggenheim Fellowship from the John Simon Guggenheim Memorial Foundation in 1995 and a fellowship from the National Endowment for the Arts in 1990–1991.

He has had retrospective exhibitions of his work at the International Center of Photography, George Eastman Museum, and Smithsonian American Art Museum.

Levinthal utilizes primarily large-format Polaroid photography. His works touch upon aspects of American culture, from Barbie to baseball to X-rated dolls. Levinthal's major series include Hitler Moves East (1972–1975), Modern Romance (1983–1985), Wild West (1986–1989), Desire (1991–1992), Blackface (1995–1998), Barbie (1997–1998), Baseball (1998–2004), History (2010–2018), and Vietnam (2018-2022).

His series, Blackface, consists of close-ups of black memorabilia, household objects infused with African-American stereotypes, causing controversy that forced the Institute of Contemporary Art of Philadelphia to cancel the exhibition while still in its early planning stages.

Toys are intriguing, and I want to see what I can do with them. On a deeper level, they represent one way that society socializes its young.

— Levinthal

Ever since I began working with toys, I have been intrigued with the idea that these seemingly benign objects could take on such incredible power and personality simply by the way they were photographed. I began to realize that by carefully selecting the depth of field and making it narrow, I could create a sense of movement and reality that was in fact not there.

— Levinthal

== Books ==
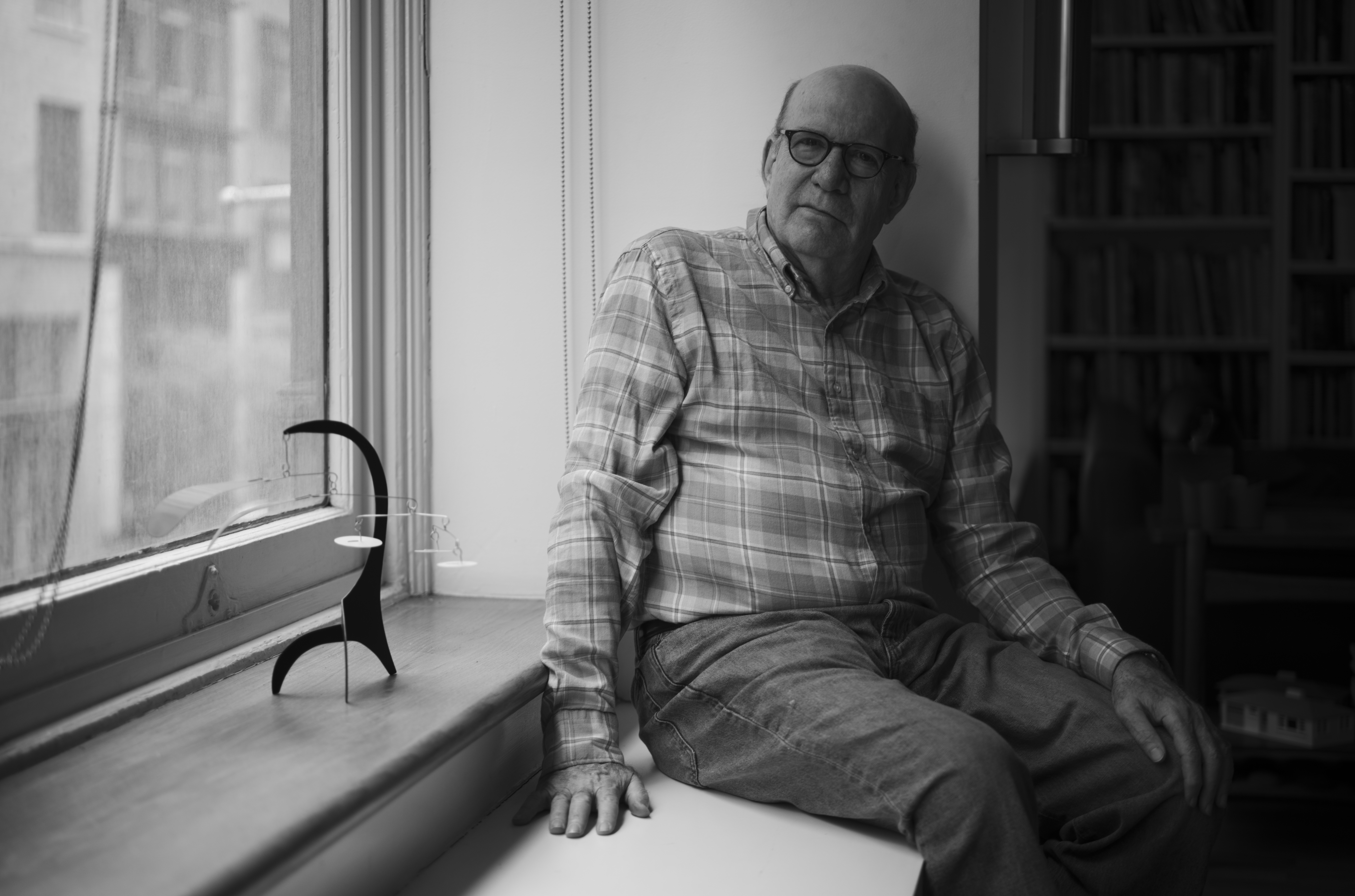
David Levinthal in 2022

- Hitler Moves East: A Graphic Chronicle, 1941–43 (Sheed, Andrews & McMeel, 1977). Published with Garry Trudeau.
- The Wild West (Smithsonian Institution, 1993). Text by Richard B. Woodward.
- Small Wonder: Worlds in a Box (Smithsonian Institution, 1995). Text by David Corey.
- Barbie Millicent Roberts (Pantheon, 1998). Text by Valerie Steele.
- Mein Kampf (Twin Palms, 1998). Texts by James Young, Roger Rosenblatt, and Gary Trudeau.
- Blackface (Arena Editions, 1999). Text by Manthia Diawara.
- XXX (Galerie Xippas, 2000). Text by Cecilia Andersson.
- David Levinthal: Modern Romance (St. Ann's, 2001). Text by Eugenia Parry.
- Netsuke (Galerie Xippas, 2004). Text by Eugenia Parry.
- David Levinthal: Work from 1975-1996 (International Center of Photography, 1997). Texts by Charles Stainback and Richard Woodward.
- Baseball (Empire, 2006). Text by Jonathan Mahler.
- I.E.D: War in Afghanistan and Iraq (powerHouse, 2009). Text by Levinthal.
- Bad Barbie (JMc & GHB Editions, 2009). Texts by Richard Prince and John McWhinnie.
- Hitler Moves East: A Graphic Chronicle, 1941-43: 35th Anniversary Edition (Andrews McMeel, 2013). Texts by Roger Rosenblatt and Garry Trudeau.
- War Games (Kehrer Verlag, 2013). Texts by Dave Hickey, Paul Roth, and Kaitlin Booher.
- History (Kehrer Verlag, 2015). Texts by Lisa Hostetler and Dave Hickey.
- War, Myth, Desire: Box Set (Kehrer Verlag, 2018). Texts by Lisa Hostetler, Joanna Marsh, Dave Hickey, Garry Trudeau, Levinthal, and Roger Rosenblatt.
- War, Myth, Desire (Kehrer Verlag, 2018). Texts by Lisa Hostetler, Joanna Marsh, Dave Hickey.
- Vietnam (Kehrer Verlag, 2024). Texts by Lisa Hostetler, Walter Kirn, and Bernard Henri-Lévy.

== Collections ==
Levinthal's work is held in the following permanent collections:

- Art Institute of Chicago
- Centre Pompidou in Paris
- National Gallery of Art in Washington, D.C.
- Metropolitan Museum of Art
- Minneapolis Institute of Art
- Museum of Modern Art
- Whitney Museum of American Art in New York City
