= Manthia Diawara =

Malian writer, filmmaker, scholar and art historian (born 1953)

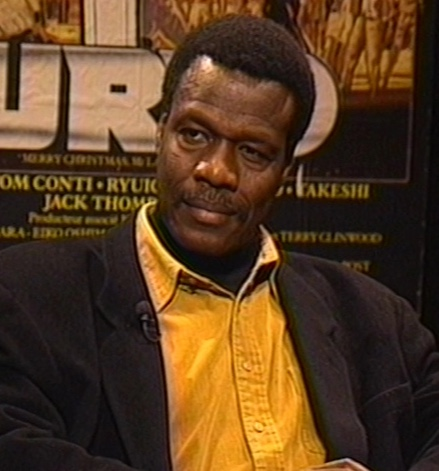
- Diawara on CUNY TV's Cinema Then, Cinema Now (1994)
- Born: December 19, 1953 (age 72); Bamako, Mali
- Education: Indiana University, University of Pennsylvania and the University of California at Santa Barbara.
- Occupations: Writer, filmmaker, theorist, professor, producer
- Writing career
- Genres: Film, history, literature, theory, art history
- Subjects: Africana Studies, Film Studies, Comparative Literature, Art History

Manthia Diawara (born December 19, 1953) is a Malian writer, filmmaker, cultural theorist, scholar, and art historian. He holds the title of University Professor at New York University (NYU), where he is Director of the Institute of Afro-American Affairs.

== Biography ==
Diawara was born in Bamako, Mali, and received his early education in France. He later received a PhD from Indiana University in 1985. Prior to teaching at NYU, Diawara taught at the University of Pennsylvania and the University of California at Santa Barbara.

Much of his research has been in the field of black cultural studies. Diawara has sought to incorporate consideration of the material conditions of African Americans to provide a broader context for the study of African diasporic culture. An aspect of this formulation has been the privileging of "Blackness" in all its possible forms rather than as relevant to a single, perhaps monolithic definition of black culture.

Diawara has contributed significantly to the study of black film. In 1992, Indiana University Press published his African Cinema: Politics & Culture and in 1993, Routledge published a volume he edited entitled Black-American Cinema. A filmmaker himself, Diawara has written and directed a number of films.

His 1998 book In Search of Africa is an account of his return to his childhood home of Guinea and was published by Harvard University Press.

Diawara is the editor-in-chief of Renaissance Noire, a journal of arts, culture, and politics dedicated to work that engages contemporary Black concerns. He serves on the advisory board of October, and is also on the editorial collective of Public Culture.

In 2003, Diawara released We Won't Budge: A Malaria Memoir, the title a tribute to Salif Keita's anthemic protest song "Nou Pas Bouger". The book was described by The Village Voice as "by turns elegiac, unsentimental, angry, and wise....his story unfolds in the triumphant days post-1960 (when Mali gained independence from France), trips into reverie for a youth spent in thrall to rock and roll, and evokes his awakenings to art and racism in the West."

Diawara serves on the board of TransAfrica Forum, alongside Harry Belafonte, Danny Glover, and Walter Mosley, which supported Barack Obama's successful candidacy for president in 2008.

In 2015, he was featured in the documentary Sembene! on the life and career of legendary Senegalese filmmaker Ousmane Sembene, a filmmaker Diawara himself profiled in his own documentary on the filmmaker, Sembene: the Making of African Cinema.

In 2022, Diawara directed AI: African Intelligence, an essay documentary. The film had its international premiere on February 18, 2023, at the Berlin International Film Festival

== Fellowships and honors ==
Jury Member, The National Black Programming Consortium, Inc., Columbus, Ohio, 1992, 1989; Jury Member, The Paul Robeson Award, The Pan-African Film Festival of Ouagadougou, 1987; NAACP Top of the Mountain Award, 1998.

== Works ==
=== Selected bibliography ===
Books (author)

- African Cinema: Politics and Culture (First ed.). Bloomington, IN: Indiana University Press. 1992. ISBN 0-253-20707-X.
- In Search of Africa (First ed.). Cambridge, MA: Harvard University Press. 1998. ISBN 0-674-00408-6.
- Levinthal, David; Diawara, Manthia (1999). Blackface (First ed.). Santa Fe, NM: Arena. ISBN 1-892041-06-5.
- The 1960s in Bamako: Malick Sidibé and James Brown. Paper series on the arts, culture, and society, no. 11. New York: Andy Warhol Foundation for the Visual Arts, 2001. OCLC 47999579. About Malick Sidibé and James Brown.
- We Won't Budge: An Exile in the World (First ed.). New York: Basic Civitas Books. 2003. ISBN 0-465-01709-6.
- Diawara, Manthia; Knape, Gunilla; Magnin, Andre (2004). Malick Sidibe: Photographs (First ed.). Germany: Steidl/Hasselblad Center. ISBN 3-88243-973-4.

Books (editor)

- Diawara, Manthia (1993). Black American Cinema (AFI Film Readers) (First ed.). London: Routledge. ISBN 0-415-90397-1.
- Baker, Houston; Diawara, Manthia; Lindeborg, Ruth H. (1996). Black British Cultural Studies: A Reader (Black Literature and Culture Series) (First ed.). Chicago, IL: University of Chicago Press. ISBN 0-226-14482-8.
- Mosely, Walter; Diawara, Manthia; Taylor, Clyde; Austin, Regina (1999). Black Genius: African American Solutions to African American Problems (First ed.). New York: W.W. Norton & Co. ISBN 0-393-31978-4.

Articles

- Diawara, Manthia (May 4, 2003). "Lives: The Pretender". The New York Times Magazine: 108. .

=== Filmography ===
- Sembène: the Making of African Cinema, 1994.
- Rouch in Reverse, 1995.
- In Search of Africa, 1997.
- Diaspora Conversations: from Goree to Dogon, 2000
- Bamako Siki Kan, 2002.
- Conakry Kas, 2003.
- Who's Afraid of Ngugi?, 2006.
- Maison Tropicale, 2008.
- Édouard Glissant: one world in relation, 2010.
- Negritude, a Dialogue between Soyinka and Senghor, 2015.
- An Opera of the World, 2017. The film was screened at documenta 14.
- A Letter from Yene (2022).
- AI: African Intelligence (2022). The film was screened at the Berlinale - Berlin International Film Festival.
- Angela Davis: A World of Greater Freedom (2023). The film was screened at the Sharjah Biennial
