= Cosima Spender =

Anglo-Italian film director, producer and writer

Cosima Spender (born in Siena, Italy) is an Anglo-Italian film director, producer and writer who has worked in varying capacities on Dolce Vita Africana (2008 director and producer), Without Gorky (2011 director and writer) and Palio (2015 writer and director). Palio won the best documentary editing award at the 2015 Tribeca Film Festival.

Spender was born in Italy but moved to England when she was fourteen. She received a degree in Anthropology and Art History at the School of Oriental and African Studies. She then went on to enroll in the post-graduate documentary directing course at the National Film and Television School also in England.

Spender is married to and sometimes collaborates with the film editor Valerio Bonelli.

Her father, Matthew Spender, is son of the poet Stephen Spender and pianist Natasha Spender; her mother, Maro, is daughter of the Armenian artist Arshile Gorky.
