= Palio (2015 film) =

- Film poster
- Directed by: Cosima Spender
- Written by: John Hunt; Cosima Spender
- Produced by: James Gay-Rees; John Hunt
- Release date: 18 April 2015 (Tribeca Film Festival)
- Running time: 92 minutes
- Countries: United Kingdom; Italy
- Language: Italian

Palio is a 2015 British documentary film. Filmed in Siena, Italy, the film documents Palio di Siena, the oldest continually run horse race in the world that is held twice each year. It is directed by Cosima Spender, and produced by James Gay-Rees and John Hunt. It was written by Hunt and Spender.

The documentary premiered on 18 April 2015 during the Tribeca Film Festival, where it won Best Editing for a Documentary (Valerio Bonelli). It additionally received a nomination in the category for Best Documentary at the British Independent Film Awards.

== Critical reception ==
On review aggregator website Rotten Tomatoes the film has an approval rating of 95% based on 20 critics, with an average rating of 7.5/10. On Metacritic, the film have an above average score of 73 out of 100 based on 9 critics, indicating "generally favorable reviews".

Mike Hale in writing on the feature for a Tribeca film Festival roundup in The New York Times described it as "Rocky on Horseback". Eight months later, another reviewer from The New York Times, Daniel M. Gold, reviewed the film and wrote that "Despite its oversights, the film — shot and scored beautifully — is an enthusiastic introduction to this delirious event and its peposo of passion, style and intrigue".

Joe Leydon in reviewing the film in Variety said "Cosima Spender's entertaining documentary about a storied Italian horse race is as dramatically satisfying as the most crowd-pleasing scripted sports saga".

Peter Bradshaw of The Guardian called Palio, "[a] handsome-looking film".
