= The Temple (novel) =

1988 semi-autobiographical novel by Stephen Spender

First edition (publ. Faber & Faber)

The Temple is a semi-autobiographical novel written by Stephen Spender, sometimes labelled a bildungsroman because of its explorations of youth and first love. It was written after Spender spent his summer holiday in Germany in 1929 and recounts his experiences there. It was not completed until the early 1930s (after Spender had failed his finals at Oxford University in 1930 and moved to Hamburg). Due to its frank depictions of homosexuality, The Temple was not published in Britain until 1988, twenty-one years after the decriminalisation of homosexuality.

== Plot ==
The Temple begins in Oxford, where Paul Schoner meets Simon Wilmot and William Bradshaw, caricatures of the young W.H. Auden and Christopher Isherwood respectively. They encourage him to visit Germany, hinting that Paul might prefer Germany to Britain because of Germany's liberal attitudes towards sex and the body. During this section, Paul is introduced to Ernst Stockmann, a fan of his poetry who later invites him to visit his family home in Hamburg.

Paul visits Ernst Stockmann, meeting his wealthy mother and friends, Joachim Lenz and Willy Lassel. During his time at the Stockmann household, Paul experiences the liberality of German youth culture first-hand, attending a party at which he drinks too much and meets Irmi, his later love affair. Paul, Ernst, Joachim and Willy also visit Hamburg's notorious quarter Sankt Pauli. In Sankt Pauli, at a bar named The Three Stars, Paul meets some young male prostitutes who claim to be destitute. It is on this evening, while he is drunk, that Paul agrees to go on holiday to the Baltic with Ernst despite being uncomfortable in Ernst's company.

When Paul and Ernst arrive at the hotel by the Baltic where they will be staying, Paul is distressed to find that Ernst has booked them into a shared room. Paul feels suffocated by Ernst's clear affection for him and tries to deter Ernst by telling him that he is not interested. Afterward, Paul ponders Stephen Wilmot's quasi-Freudian premise that it is kindest to offer love in return to those who love you, especially if you do not find them attractive. As a result, when Ernst comes on to Paul in the hotel room, Paul accepts his attention and they have an uncomfortable sexual encounter. In the morning, Paul is keen to escape the hotel room, and runs down to a beach, where he meets Irmi again. They have a more satisfying sexual experience on the beach.

In the next chapter, Paul goes on a trip with Joachim Lenz to the Rhine. On this trip, Joachim makes it clear that he intends to fall in love, but there is little indication that he and Paul could be lovers. Nevertheless, Paul is distressed when Joachim books him an adjacent hotel room so that Joachim can stay with a young man named Heinrich, whom he met on the beach.

In Part Two, "Towards the Dark", Paul returns to Germany in the winter of 1932. Spender admits in his introduction to the 1988 edition that both parts had taken place in 1929 in reality, but that he moved this part forward to winter 1932 to increase the sense of foreboding (as Adolf Hitler came to power in Germany later that winter). In this section, Paul visits several of his friends again, most notably Willy Lassel, who is now engaged to a Nazi woman, and Joachim Lenz, whose relationship with Heinrich is struggling. Heinrich has made friends with Erich, a fascist man. Paul meets him and is disgusted and disturbed by his ideology. Soon after, Paul visits Joachim again and finds him with a cut on his face, staying in a trashed flat. Joachim tells Paul how one of Heinrich's Nazi friends had threatened him and destroyed his possessions after Joachim defiled a Nazi party uniform belonging to Heinrich. This discussion about their former acquaintances is the end of the novel.

== Biographical background ==
During the holiday in 1929 on which The Temple is based, Spender formed friendships with Herbert List (photographer) and Ernst Robert Curtius (German critic), the latter of which introduced him to and cultivated his passion for Rilke, Hölderlin, Schiller, and Goethe. Spender had a particularly significant relationship with German culture which he found heavily conflicted with his Jewish roots. His taste for German society sets him apart from some of his contemporaries; however, even after contemplating suicide if the Nazis were to invade England due to his abhorrence of their regime, he still maintained a love of Germany, returning to it after the war and writing a book about its ruins.
