= Transit (2005 film) =

- Written by: Murilo Pasta; Niall McCormick
- Directed by: Niall McCormick
- Starring: Anna Slynko; Humberto Busto; Shelley Conn; Victor Gatonye
- Theme music composer: Srdjan Kurpjel; Steve Wellington
- Country of origin: United Kingdom
- Original language: English

Production
- Producer: Nikki Parrott
- Cinematography: Jan Jonaeus
- Editors: Andrija Zafranović; Sven Pavlinić

Original release
- Network: MTV
- Release: 1 December 2005

Transit is a 2005 television film made by MTV Europe and Tigerlily Films. It was the first TV movie made by MTV.

It was filmed in St. Petersburg, Mexico City, Nairobi and Los Angeles and shows the lives of 4 people travelling across the globe. During their journeys they think and reason about issues of life such as emotionality and sexuality.

== Plot ==
Transit is presented in a non-linear narrative and follows four main characters from around the world who meet in fortuitous circumstances. The film opens in Los Angeles sometime in 2004, where Asha, an Americanized Indian woman, returns from her trip to Nairobi, Kenya and is riding a taxi driving through the freeway.

Six months earlier in St. Petersburg, Russia. Tatjana, a secretary, is in an abusive relationship with Yuri, a cab driver and drug user. On impulse, she ends the relationship and proceeds to have sex with a Mexican businessman named Ruben, whom she has flirted with in her boss's office to the chagrin of her close friend, Masha.

Tatjana naively believes that Ruben is the man she wants to be with, and so she ends up flying to Mexico City to follow him. Upon tracking his residence, Tatjana is dismayed when a woman holding a baby in her arms states that she is Ruben's wife after saying that she is looking for Ruben. Tatjana goes to a public park to make a call on a payphone and scream her frustrations to Ruben on the phone. Emotionally tired and exhausted from the flight and carrying her large stroller bag around the city in the heat, Tatjana loses consciousness and faints on the spot.

Nearby, a man has observed Tatjana whilst enjoying a picnic with his friends. A brief flashback of two months prior reveals the man to be Jose Luis, nicknamed Champignon (mushroom) or Champy for short, by his handsome yet womanizing friend, Blanco. Champy feels envy and resentment towards Blanco as he is unsuccessful in finding a girlfriend, whilst Blanco already has a relationship but finds time to enjoy infidelities with beautiful women, despite Blanco's good intentions to pair him with women during his secret trips with his mistresses in Acapulco.

Champy, however, has landed a job with a brewery company, and the story returns to present time to the picnic with Champy, Blanco, and the rest of their friends to celebrate Champy's new job. When Champy sees Tatjana faint after her phone call, he immediately runs to her side with his friends chasing after him. The group crowds around the unknown girl, and one of Champy's female friends suggest that he take her to his apartment to recover.

In Los Angeles, Asha is shown with Vip, her fiancé who is also an Americanized Indian, having lunch to celebrate an event. Asha is a film student on her way to Kenya to shoot her graduation documentary film. Her parents are conservative and traditional Indian people, and they record a heartfelt video message to Asha's uncle and aunt, whom she will be residing with once she arrives in Nairobi.

On the eve before her flight, Asha stumbles upon a sex tape of Vip with one of his female Caucasian colleagues she found while preparing to follow Vip to a nightclub where he his partying with his friends. Hurt by this betrayal, she goes to the nightclub and witnesses with her very eyes that Vip is indeed not the man she knows. The couple argue outside the club and Asha terminates their engagement after it is further revealed that Vip has had more than one instance of his sexual liaisons with other women.

During their fight, Champy is seen by his car packing things in the trunk. The scene then cuts to Champy and Asha in an empty bar, with Champy writing down his contact details on his company's promotional sticky note paper and give it to Asha.

In Nairobi, Asha is living with her relatives. Her documentary project comes to a temporary obstacle, with her original concept scrapped because of lack of funds from her documentary subject, and she is frustrated at having to start over and look for a new story angle. The story also introduces Matthew, a local who is into the burgeoning hip-hop culture of Nairobi.

== About the film ==
MTV Europe and Tigerlily Films produced this film to air directly on television on all MTV Networks on 1 December, the World AIDS Day. Its goal is to make teenagers think about matters such as sex and relationships.

Transit was made as part of MTV's Staying Alive campaign, which aims to raise HIV awareness and reduce discrimination against HIV positive individuals. The movie was partially funded by the Swedish International Development Cooperation Agency.

The film is also available as a free download via the Staying Alive website. Unfortunately this was removed when MTV and the Staying Alive Foundation changed the design of their website in 2008, for the 27th World AIDS Day since the virus, HIV, that eventually leads to the development of AIDS, was discovered. The film Transit can now be found to watch on YouTube.
