= Wassoulou-Ballé =

- Commune
- Location in Mali
- Coordinates: 11°10′43″N 8°9′20″W
- Country: Mali
- Region: Sikasso Region
- Cercle: Yanfolila Cercle

Area
  - Total: 1,594 km^{2} (615 sq mi)

Population (2009 census)
  - Total: 51,727
  - Density: 32.45/km^{2} (84.05/sq mi)
- Time zone: UTC+0 (GMT)

Wassoulou-Ballé is a rural commune in the Cercle of Yanfolila in the Sikasso Region of southern Mali. The administrative center (chef-lieu) of the commune is the town of Yanfolila. The town is also the administrative center of the cercle. It lies 272 km west of Sikasso, 164 km south of Bamako and 23 km from the border with Guinea. The commune covers an area of 1,594 square kilometers and includes the town of Yanfolila and 29 villages. In the 2009 census it had a population of 51,727.
