= Dolce Vita Africana =

2008 film by Cosima Spender

- Directed by: Cosima Spender
- Produced by: Natasha Dack; Nikki Parrott; Cosima Spender
- Cinematography: Natasha Braier
- Edited by: Emiliano Battista
- Release date: 2008
- Running time: 59 minutes
- Country: United Kingdom

Dolce Vita Africana is a British 2008 documentary film directed by Cosima Spender and about the Malian photographer Malick Sidibé.

== Synopsis ==
Dolce Vita Africana is a documentary about the internationally renowned Malian photographer Malick Sidibé, whose iconic images from the late 1950s through the 70s captured the carefree spirit of his generation asserting their freedom after independence and up until an Islamic coup ushered in years of military dictatorship. The filmmaker travels to Sidibé's studio in Bamako, Mali, to witness the artist at work and meet many of the subjects of his earlier photographs, whose personal stories also tell the history of Mali.

== Reception ==
The New York Amsterdam News said the film has "a rich fusion of Malian music that colors the soundtrack, enhancing the dances, fashion and athletic games enjoyed by the youth of the period". Le Monde journalist Claire Guillot called it "a sensitive and touching film, letting the photographer speak for himself and live his life". Keith Watson of Metro wrote, "You get so accustomed to images of Africa focusing on the traumatic disasters and negative stories which have swept across the continent that Dolce Vita Africana felt like discovering an entirely new world."
