= Stephen Spender =

English poet and man of letters (1909–1995)

Sir Stephen Spender CBE
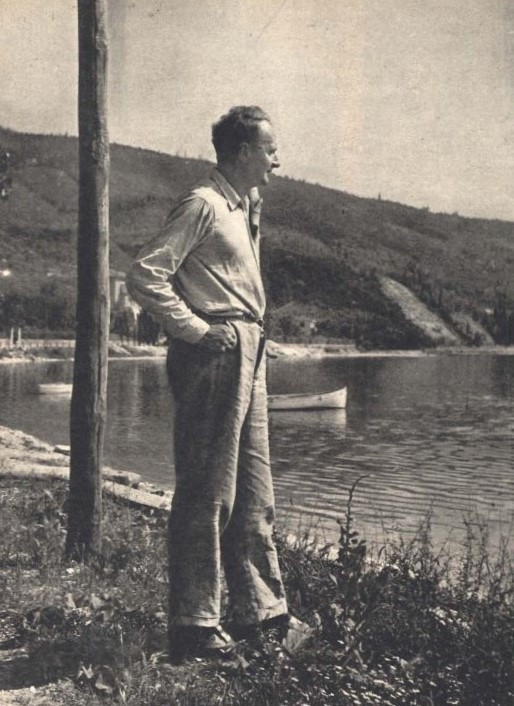
- Spender in 1933
- Born: 28 February 1909; Kensington, London, England
- Died: 16 July 1995 (aged 86); St John's Wood, London, England
- Education: University College, Oxford
- Occupations: Poet, novelist, essayist
- Spouse: Inez Pearn (m. 1936; div. 1939) Natasha Litvin (m. 1941)
- Children: Elizabeth; Matthew
- Parent(s): Harold Spender and Violet Hilda Schuster

Sir Stephen Harold Spender CBE (28 February 1909 – 16 July 1995) was an English poet, novelist and essayist whose work concentrated on themes of social injustice and the class struggle. He was appointed U.S. Poet Laureate Consultant in Poetry to the Library of Congress in 1965.

== Early life ==
Spender was born in Kensington, London, to journalist Harold Spender and Violet Hilda Schuster, a painter and poet, of German Jewish heritage. He went first to Hall School in Hampstead and then at 13 to Gresham's School, Holt, and later Charlecote School in Worthing, but he was unhappy there. On the death of his mother, he was transferred to University College School (Hampstead), which he later described as "that gentlest of schools". Spender left for Nantes and Lausanne and then went up to University College, Oxford (much later, in 1973, he was made an honorary fellow). Spender said at various times throughout his life that he never passed any exam. Perhaps his closest friend and the man who had the biggest influence on him was W. H. Auden, who introduced him to Christopher Isherwood. Spender handprinted the earliest version of Auden's Poems. He left Oxford without taking a degree and in 1929 moved to Hamburg. Isherwood invited him to Berlin. Every six months, Spender went back to England.

Spender was acquainted with fellow Auden Group members Louis MacNeice, Edward Upward and Cecil Day-Lewis. He was friendly with David Jones and later came to know William Butler Yeats, Allen Ginsberg, Ted Hughes, Joseph Brodsky, Isaiah Berlin, Mary McCarthy, Roy Campbell, Raymond Chandler, Dylan Thomas, Jean-Paul Sartre, Colin Wilson, Aleister Crowley, F. T. Prince and T. S. Eliot, as well as members of the Bloomsbury Group, particularly Virginia Woolf. He was involved with American writer William Goyen and later traveled with a group through India with Goyen's former partner, American artist Joseph Glasco.

== Career ==
Spender began work on a novel in 1929, which was not published until 1988, under the title The Temple. This partly-autobiographical novel is about a young man who travels to Germany and finds a culture at once more open than England's, particularly about relationships between men, and shows frightening harbingers of Nazism that are confusingly related to the very openness the man admires. Spender wrote in his 1988 introduction:

In the late Twenties young English writers were more concerned with censorship than with politics.... 1929 was the last year of that strange Indian Summer—the Weimar Republic. For many of my friends and for myself, Germany seemed a paradise where there was no censorship and young Germans enjoyed extraordinary freedom in their lives

Spender was discovered by T. S. Eliot, an editor at Faber and Faber, in 1933.

His early poetry, notably Poems (1933), was often inspired by social protest. Living in Vienna, he further expressed his convictions in Forward from Liberalism; in Vienna (1934), a long poem in praise of the 1934 uprising of Austrian socialists; and in Trial of a Judge (1938), an antifascist drama in verse.

At the Shakespeare and Company bookstore in Paris, which published the first edition of James Joyce's Ulysses, historic figures made rare appearances to read their work: Paul Valéry, André Gide and Eliot. Hemingway even broke his rule of not reading in public if Spender would read with him. Since Spender agreed, Hemingway appeared for a rare reading in public with him.

In 1936, Spender became a member of the Communist Party of Great Britain. Harry Pollitt, its head, invited him to write for the Daily Worker on the Moscow Trials. In late 1936, Spender married Inez Pearn, whom he had recently met at an Aid to Spain meeting. She was described as "small and rather ironic" and "strikingly good-looking".

In January 1937, during the Spanish Civil War, the Daily Worker sent Spender to Spain on a mission to observe and report on the Soviet ship Komsomol, which had sunk while carrying Soviet weapons to the Second Spanish Republic. He travelled to Tangier with his close friend, T. C. Worsley and tried to enter Spain via Cádiz, but they were sent back. They then travelled to Valencia, where Spender met Hemingway and Manuel Altolaguirre. A secondary (or possibly the primary) reason for his trip was an initially unsuccessful attempt to rescue his jilted lover, the "former Welsh Guardsman turned occasional prostitute" Tony Hyndman, who had left for Spain two days after Spender's marriage to join the International Brigade. Hyndman saw action at the Battle of Jarama in February 1937, and promptly deserted. He was captured and imprisoned in a Republican jail on charges of desertion and cowardice. Spender eventually secured his release and repatriation, in the process being forced to disclose the sexual nature of their relationship to Harry Pollitt, head of the Communist Party of Great Britain, leading shortly afterwards to his departure from the Party.

In July 1937, Spender attended the Second International Writers' Congress, the purpose of which was to discuss the attitude of intellectuals to the war, held in Valencia, Barcelona and Madrid and attended by many writers, including Hemingway, André Malraux, and Pablo Neruda.

Spender was imprisoned for a while in Albacete. In Madrid, he met Malraux; they discussed Gide's Retour de l'U.R.S.S.. Because of medical problems, he went back to England and bought a house in Lavenham. In 1939, he divorced.

Spender's 1938 translations of works by Bertolt Brecht and Miguel Hernández appeared in John Lehmann's New Writing.

Spender felt close to the Jewish people; his mother, Violet Hilda Schuster, was half-Jewish (her father's family were German Jews who converted to Christianity, and her mother came from an upper-class family of Catholic German, Lutheran Danish and distant Italian descent). His second wife, Natasha, whom he married in 1941, was also Jewish. In 1942, he joined the fire brigade of Cricklewood and Maresfield Gardens as a volunteer. Spender met several times with the poet Edwin Muir.

After leaving the Communist Party, Spender wrote of his disillusionment with communism in the essay collection The God that Failed (1949), along with Arthur Koestler and others. It is thought that one of the big areas of disappointment was the Molotov–Ribbentrop Pact between Germany and the Soviet Union, which many leftists saw as a betrayal. Like Auden, Isherwood and several other outspoken opponents of fascism in the 1930s, Spender did not see active military service in World War II. He was initially graded C upon examination because of his earlier colitis, poor eyesight, varicose veins and the long-term effects of a tapeworm in 1934. But he pulled strings to be reexamined and was upgraded to B, which meant he could serve in the London Auxiliary Fire Service. Spender spent the winter of 1940 teaching at Blundell's School, taking a position that had been vacated by Manning Clark, who returned to Australia as a consequence of the war to teach at Geelong Grammar.

After the war, Spender was a member of the Allied Control Commission, restoring civil authority in Germany.

With Cyril Connolly and Peter Watson, Spender co-founded Horizon magazine and served as its editor from 1939 to 1941. From 1947 to 1949, he went to the US several times and saw Auden and Isherwood. He was the editor of Encounter magazine from 1953 to 1966 but resigned after it emerged that the Congress for Cultural Freedom, which published it, was covertly funded by the CIA.

Spender insisted that he was unaware of the ultimate source of the magazine's funds. He taught at various American institutions including University of California at Berkeley and Northwestern University. He accepted the Elliston Chair of Poetry at the University of Cincinnati in 1954. In 1961, he became professor of rhetoric at Gresham College, London.

Spender helped found the magazine Index on Censorship, was involved in the founding of the Poetry Book Society and did work for UNESCO. He was appointed the 17th Poet Laureate Consultant in Poetry to the Library of Congress in 1965.

During the late 1960s, Spender frequently visited the University of Connecticut, which he declared had the "most congenial teaching faculty" he had encountered in the United States.

Spender was Professor of English at University College London from 1970 to 1977 and then became professor emeritus. He was appointed a Commander of the Order of the British Empire (CBE) in the 1962 Birthday Honours, and knighted in the 1983 Birthday Honours. At a ceremony commemorating the 40th anniversary of the Normandy Invasion on 6 June 1984, US President Ronald Reagan quoted from Spender's poem "The Truly Great" in his remarks:

Gentlemen, I look at you and I think of the words of Stephen Spender's poem. You are men who in your 'lives fought for life... and left the vivid air signed with your honor'.

== World of art ==
Spender also engaged profoundly with the world of art, including intellectual exchanges with Pablo Picasso. The artist Henry Moore did etchings and lithographs to accompany the work of writers, including Charles Baudelaire and Spender. Moore's work in that regard also included illustrations of the literature of Dante, Gide and Shakespeare. The exhibition was held at The Henry Moore Foundation.

Spender "collected and befriended artists such as Arp, Auerbach, Bacon, Freud, Giacometti, Gorky, Guston, Hockney, Moore, Morandi, Picasso and others". In The Worlds of Stephen Spender, the artist Frank Auerbach selected art work by those masters to accompany Spender's poems.

Spender wrote China Diary with Hockney in 1982, published by Thames and Hudson art publishers in London.

The Russian-born artist Wassily Kandinsky created an etching for Spender, Fraternity, in 1939.

== Personal life ==
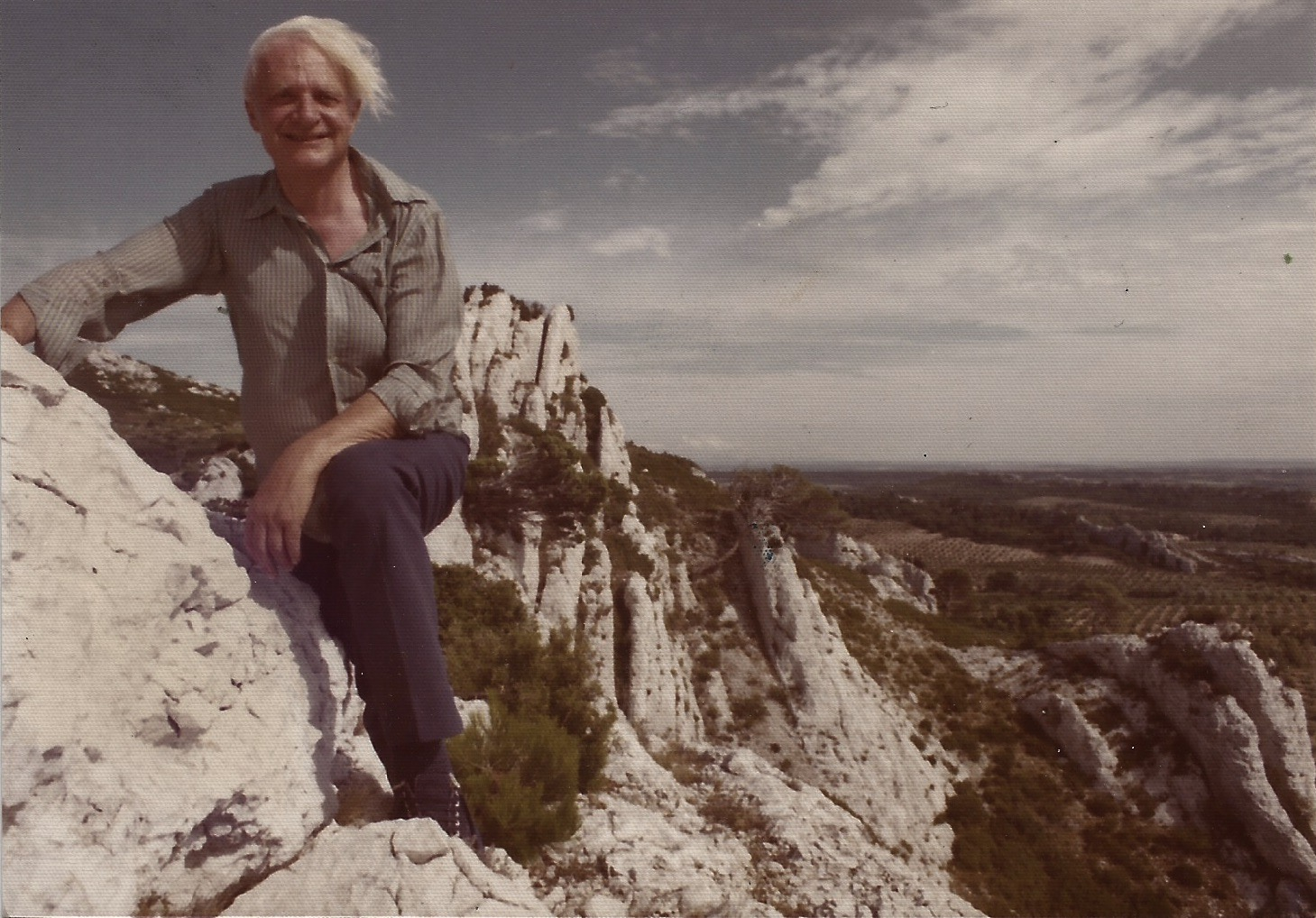
Stephen Spender on a holiday in the South of France, photographed by Keith Milow, ca. 1970

Spender had multiple relationships with both men and women during his life. In 1933, he fell in love with Tony Hyndman, and they lived together from 1935 to 1936. In 1934, Spender had an affair with Muriel Gardiner. In a letter to Christopher Isherwood in September 1934, he wrote, "I find boys much more attractive, in fact I am rather more than usually susceptible, but actually I find the actual sexual act with women more satisfactory, more terrible, more disgusting, and, in fact, more everything". In December 1936, shortly after the end of his relationship with Hyndman, Spender fell in love with and married Inez Pearn after an engagement of only three weeks. The marriage broke down in 1939. In 1941, Spender married Natasha Litvin, a concert pianist. The marriage lasted until his death. Their daughter, Elizabeth Spender, previously an actress, was married to the Australian actor and satirist Barry Humphries until his death in April 2023, and their son, Matthew Spender, was married to the daughter of the Armenian artist Arshile Gorky.

Spender's sexuality has been the subject of debate. His seemingly changing attitudes have caused him to be labelled bisexual, repressed, latently homophobic, or simply something complex that resists easy labelling. Many of his friends in his earlier years were gay. Spender had many affairs with men in his earlier years, most notably Hyndman, who was called "Jimmy Younger" in his memoir World Within World. After his affair with Muriel Gardiner, he shifted his focus to heterosexuality, but his relationship with Hyndman complicated both that relationship and his short-lived marriage to Pearn. His marriage to Litvin in 1941 seems to have marked the end of his romantic relationships with men but not the end of all homosexual activity, as his unexpurgated diaries have revealed. Subsequently, he toned down homosexual allusions in later editions of his poetry. The following line was revised in a republished edition: "Whatever happens, I shall never be alone. I shall always have a boy, a railway fare, or a revolution" to "Whatever happens, I shall never be alone. I shall always have an affair, a railway fare, or a revolution". Nevertheless, he was a founding member of the Homosexual Law Reform Society, which lobbied for the repeal of British sodomy laws. Spender sued author David Leavitt for allegedly using his relationship with "Jimmy Younger" in Leavitt's While England Sleeps in 1994. The case was settled out of court, with Leavitt removing certain portions from his text.

== Death ==
On 16 July 1995, Spender died of a heart attack in Westminster, London, aged 86. He was buried in the graveyard of St Mary on Paddington Green Church, in London.

== Stephen Spender Trust ==
The Stephen Spender Trust is a registered charity that was founded to widen the knowledge of 20th-century literature, with a particular focus on Spender's circle of writers, and to promote literary translation. The trust's activities include poetry readings; academic conferences; a seminar series in partnership with the Institute of English Studies; an archive programme in conjunction with the British Library and the Bodleian; work with schools via Translation Nation; the Guardian Stephen Spender Prize, an annual poetry translation prize established in 2004; and the Joseph Brodsky/Stephen Spender Prize, a worldwide Russian–English translation competition.

== Awards and honours ==
Spender was awarded the Golden PEN Award in 1995.

== Works ==
=== Poetry ===
- Twenty Poems (1930)
- Poems (1933)
- Vienna (1934)
- The Still Centre (1939)
- Ruins and Visions (1942)
- Spiritual Exercises (1943, privately printed)
- Poems of Dedication (1947)
- The Edge of Being (1949)
- Collected Poems, 1928–1953 (1955)
- Selected Poems (1965)
- The Express (1966)
- The Generous Days (1971)
- Selected Poems (1974)
- Recent Poems (1978)
- Collected Poems 1928–1985 (1986)
- Dolphins (1994)
- New Collected Poems, edited by Michael Brett, (2004)

=== Drama ===
- Trial of a Judge (1938)
- Rasputin's End (opera libretto, music by Nicolas Nabokov, 1958)
- The Oedipus Trilogy (1985)

=== Novels and short story collections ===
- The Burning Cactus (1936, stories)
- The Backward Son (1940)
- Engaged in Writing (1958)
- The Temple (written 1929; published 1988)

=== Criticism, travel books and essays ===
- The Destructive Element (1935)
- Forward from Liberalism (1937)
- Life and the Poet (1942)
- Citizens in War – and After (1945)
- European Witness (1946)
- Poetry Since 1939 (1945)
- The God that Failed (1949, with others, ex-Communists' testimonies)
- Learning Laughter (1952)
- The Creative Element (1953)
- The Making of a Poem
- The Struggle of the Modern (1963)
- The Year of the Young Rebels (1969)
- D. H. Lawrence: Novelist, Poet, Prophet (edited by Spender, 1973)
- Love-Hate Relations (1974)
- Eliot (1975; Fontana Modern Masters)
- W. H. Auden: A Tribute (edited by Spender, 1975)
- The Thirties and After (1978)
- China Diary (with David Hockney, 1982)

=== Memoir ===
- World Within World (1951). This autobiography is a re-creation of much of the political and social atmosphere of the 1930s.

=== Letters and journals ===
- Letters to Christopher: Stephen Spender's Letter to Christopher Isherwood (1980)
- Journals, 1939–1983 (1985)
- New Selected Journals, 1939–1995 (2012)

== See also ==
- List of Gresham Professors of Rhetoric
