= Only When I Dance =

- Directed by: Beadie Finzi
- Produced by: Giorgia Lo Savio; Nikki Parrott
- Starring: Irlan Santos da Silva; Isabela Coracy
- Edited by: Alan Levy; Felipe Lacerda
- Music by: Stephen Hilton
- Production company: Tigerlily Films
- Release date: April 2009 (Tribeca)
- Running time: 78 minutes
- Country: United Kingdom
- Language: Portuguese

Only When I Dance (also known as Nés Pour Danser and Vida Ballet) is a 2009 British documentary film directed by Beadie Finzi and strarring Irlan Santos da Silva and Isabela Coracy.

== Synopsis ==
Only When I Dance tells the story of two teenagers, Irlan and Isabela, who pursue their dreams of becoming professional ballet dancers as a way to escape the violent slums of Rio de Janeiro.

== Production ==
The producers spent over three years trying to find the candidates to be filmed, and the film took around ten months to film.

== Release ==
The film premiered at the Tribeca Film Festival in April 2009. It was subsequently shown at several other major film festivals, including the Edinburgh International Film Festival, the San Francisco International DocFest, the Rio Film Festival, Guadalajara Film Festival and Sheffield Doc/Fest. It was broadcast on television in the United Kingdom on Christmas Day 2009. It was released in USA in summer 2010. Prior to release it was pitched at the 2007 Sheffield Doc/Fest MeetMarket.

== Reception ==
The Guardian awarded the film four out of five stars and calling it a "moving, if rather shallow documentary".

The website Eye for Film awarded the film three and a half out of five stars, saying the film "shows how an artistic calling can be imbued with life-and-death determination."
