= Matthew Spender =

English sculptor (1945–2026)

Matthew Spender (6 February 1945 – 31 May 2026) was an English sculptor and writer.

== Life and career ==
Spender was born in London, England in 1945, the son of the poet Stephen Spender and the pianist Natasha Spender. He was the father of Saskia Spender and the filmmaker Cosima Spender. He was educated at Westminster School and in later life made a statue of the school's foundress, Elizabeth I, which was unveiled in 2010.

He was the author of From a High Place: A Life of Arshile Gorky (1999), a biography of his father-in-law, the artist Arshile Gorky, and A House in St John's Wood (2015), about his father, the poet Stephen Spender. He also wrote Within Tuscany: Reflections on a Time and Place (1992, Viking, and 1993, Penguin).

Spender died in Gaiole in Chianti, Tuscany on 31 May 2026, at the age of 81.
