= Natasha Spender =

English pianist and author (1919–2010)

Natasha Spender, Lady Spender (née Litvin; 18 April 1919 – 21 October 2010) was an English pianist and author. She was the second wife of the writer Sir Stephen Spender.

== Biography ==
She was born in London. Her maternal family emigrated to Britain as Jewish refugees from Lithuania. Her mother, Rachel, learned English after the family settled in Glasgow, and later became an actress at the Old Vic. Her father, who was married to another woman, was the music critic, Edwin Evans.

Due to her mother's work and precarous financial situation as a child Litvin was fostered her first nine years by a family in Maidenhead. She would later come to be raised in the family of George and Margaret Booth (her foster father was a son of Charles Booth) at Funtington House in West Sussex.

The Booths seeing that she had a talent for music encouraged her in this pursuit. At age 16, Litvin won a scholarship to the Royal College of Music and studied with Clifford Curzon and Arthur Benjamin. After the Second World War, she gave a concert at the former Bergen-Belsen concentration camp to inmates who were recovering in its hospital wing. She was the soloist in the world's first televised concert for the BBC, the last night of The Proms on 13 September 1947 from the Royal Albert Hall.

She first met Stephen Spender in 1940, marrying him in 1941, and the couple were for many years part of a literary circle which included W. H. Auden, Christopher Isherwood, T. S. Eliot and Sir Isaiah Berlin. They divided their time between their homes in St John's Wood and Mas St Jerome in Provence.

In her forties she was forced to give up the piano because of breast cancer, which affected her arm muscles, but she quickly re-established herself as an academic specialising in the psychology of music, and contributed to the Grove Dictionary of Music and Musicians. A collection of writings, about her late husband and her passion for gardening, An English Garden in Provence, appeared in 2004.

In 2007, Spender appeared on BBC Radio 4's Desert Island Discs, choosing Mozart's 1st movement of String Quintet in G Minor, Walter de la Mare's Desert Islands: An Anthology, and her grand piano as her selected favourite record, book and luxury item respectively.

Lady Spender died on 21 October 2010 at the age of 91. An archive of her papers is held at the Bodleian Library

She had two children with Stephen Spender: their daughter Elizabeth "Lizzie" Spender, previously an actress, is the widow of the Australian actor and satirist Barry Humphries, and their son Matthew Spender is married to the daughter of the Armenian-born artist Arshile Gorky.
