= Sélingué Dam =

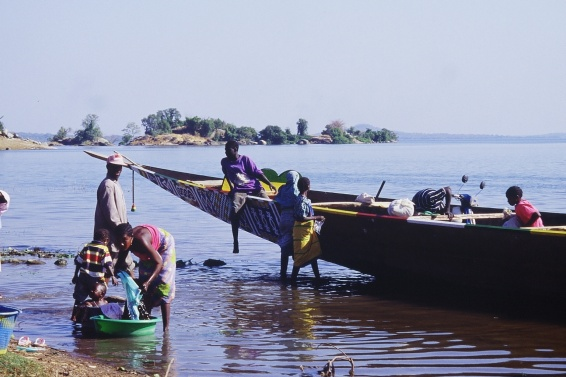
- Local people on the shore of Lake Sélingué

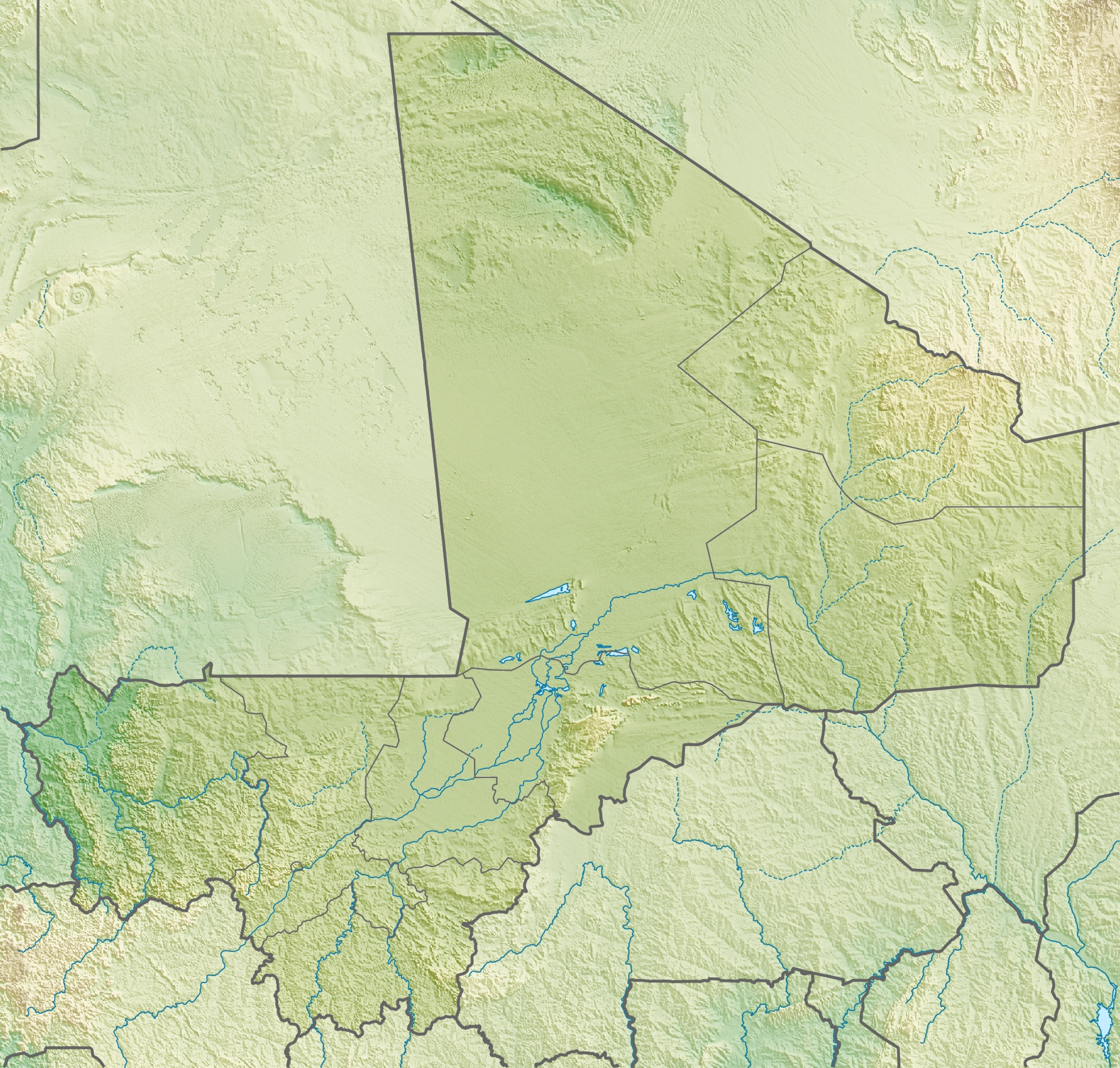
- Location within Mali
- Official name: Barrage de Sélingué (French)
- Location: Sikasso Region, Mali
- Coordinates: 11°38′17.7″N 8°13′47.2″W
- Purpose: Power, irrigation
- Construction began: 1979
- Opening date: 1982
- Construction cost: 140 million US dollars
- Operator: Office of Rural Development of Sélingué

Dam and spillways
- Impounds: Sankarani River
- Height: 23 metres (75 ft)
- Length: 2,600 metres (8,500 ft)
- Spillway capacity: 3,500 m^{3}/s (120,000 cu ft/s)

Reservoir
- Creates: Lake Sélingué
- Total capacity: 2,630,000,000 m^{3} (2,130,000 acre⋅ft)
- Surface area: 430 km^{2} (170 mi^{2})

Power Station
- Turbines: 4 x 11 MW Kaplan-type
- Installed capacity: 44 MW
- Annual generation: 200 million kWh

The Sélingué Dam (French: Barrage de Sélingué) is an embankment dam with a gravity section located in the Sikasso Region, on the Sankarani River, one of the affluents of the Niger River. It is an important center of energy production in Mali surpassed only by the Manantali Dam on the Bafing River.

Its construction, at the cost of 140 million US dollars, was financed by several backers.

The dam has a crest length of 2,600 metres (8,500 ft) and a height of 23 metres (75 ft). With a power output of 44 MW, the dam has an energy output of 200 million kilowatt-hours per year. The dam provides Bamako, Kati, Koulikoro, Ségou, Fana, Dioïla, Yanfolila and Kalana with electricity. It was brought into service in 1982, and renovated between 1996 and 2001.

The retaining basin of the dam forms the artificial Lake Sélingué. The water level has a maximum height of 349 metres (1,145 ft) but varies throughout the year. When full the lake stores 2.2 cubic kilometres (0.53 cu mi) of water and has an area of 409 square kilometres (158 sq mi). It allows agriculture on the irrigated perimeters, managed by the Office of Rural Development of Sélingué, as well as fishing.
