= Lake Sélingué =

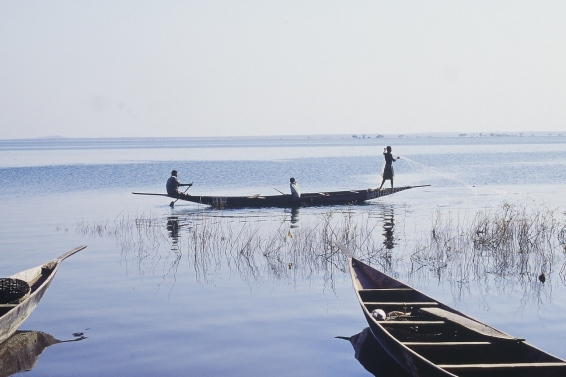
- Fishermen casting nets on Lake Sélingué

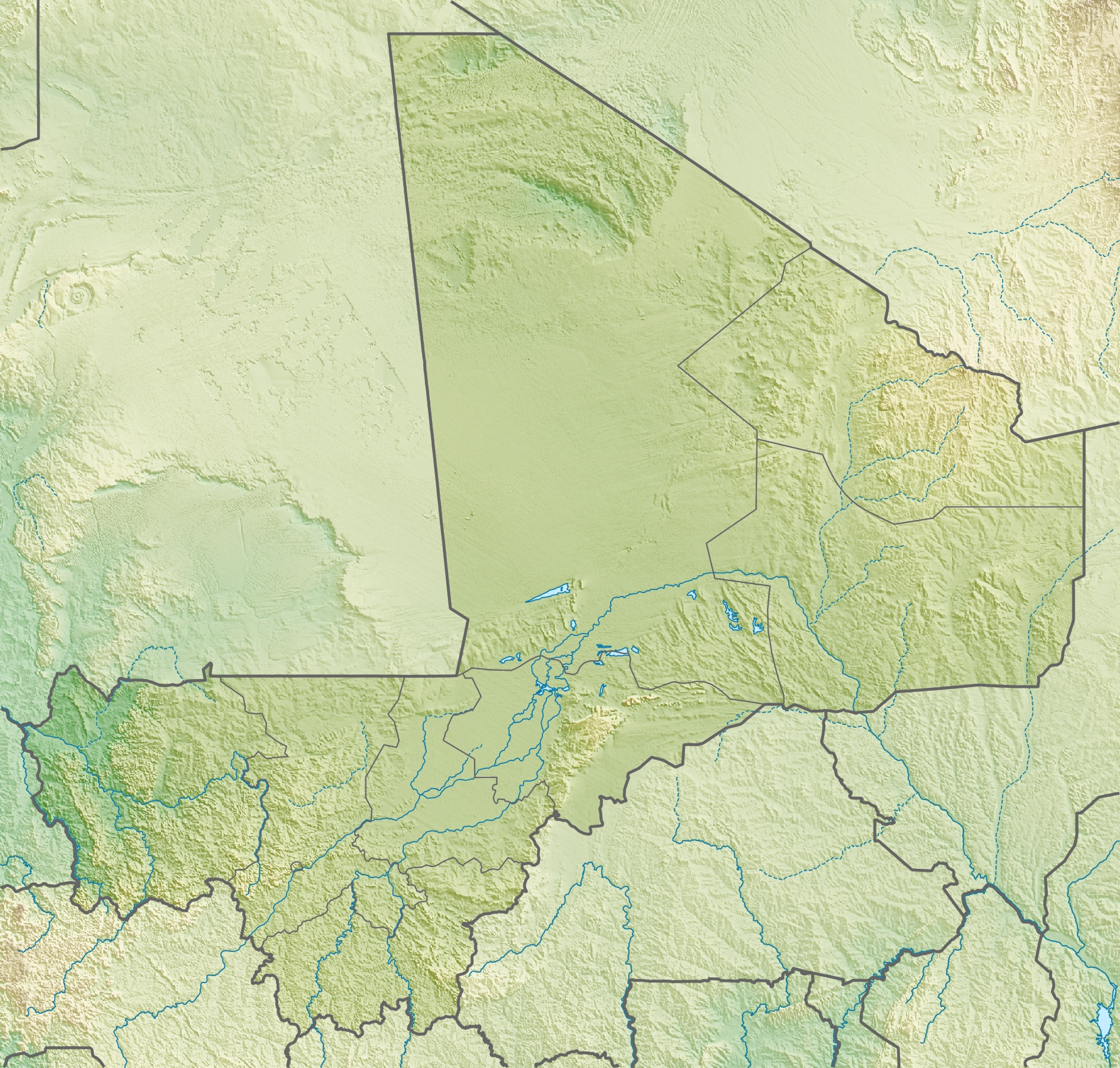
- Location within Mali
- Location: Sikasso Region
- Coordinates: 11°37′N 8°14′W
- Type: Monomictic reservoir
- Basin countries: Mali, Guinea
- Surface area: 409 km^{2} (158 sq mi) (max)
- Average depth: 5.3 m (17 ft)
- Max. depth: 20 m (66 ft)
- Water volume: 2.166 km^{3} (1,756,000 acre⋅ft)
- Surface elevation: 348.5–340.0 m (1,143.4–1,115.5 ft)
- Settlements: La Carrière, Faraba

Lake Sélingué is a 409 km^{2} artificial lake in Mali's Sikasso Region, formed by the Sélingué Hydroelectric dam on the Sankarani River. Its southwestern arm forms part of the border with Guinea. Lake Sélingué, rising and falling in the rainy and dry seasons, allows agriculture on the irrigated perimeters, managed by the Office of Rural Development of Sélingué, as well as fishing. Since its creation, numerous communities have grown along the lake, the two largest being the towns of La Carrière and Faraba. Fishing the lake provides employment for more than 8,000 people in its various fishing communities, with an annual catch of around 4,000 tonnes. Most fish available in Bamako come from Lake Sélingué.

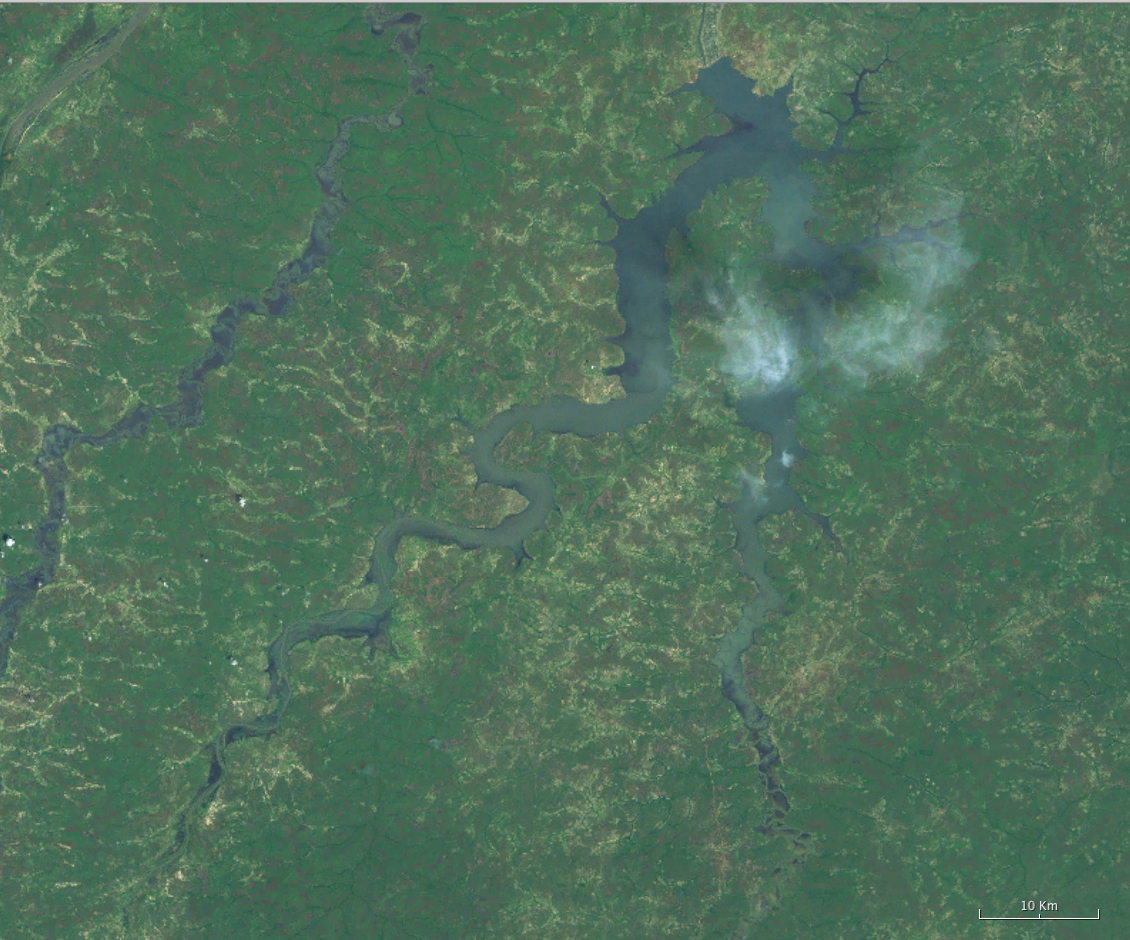
Lake Sélingué seen from space.

Sélingué is Mali's second largest artificial lake (reservoir) after Lake Manantali, created by the construction of the Manantali dam in 1988.
