= Sankarani River =

River in West Africa

Coordinates: 12°00′15″N 8°18′46″W

Designations

Ramsar Wetland
- Official name: Sankarani-Fié
- Designated: 17 January 2002
- Reference no.: 1167

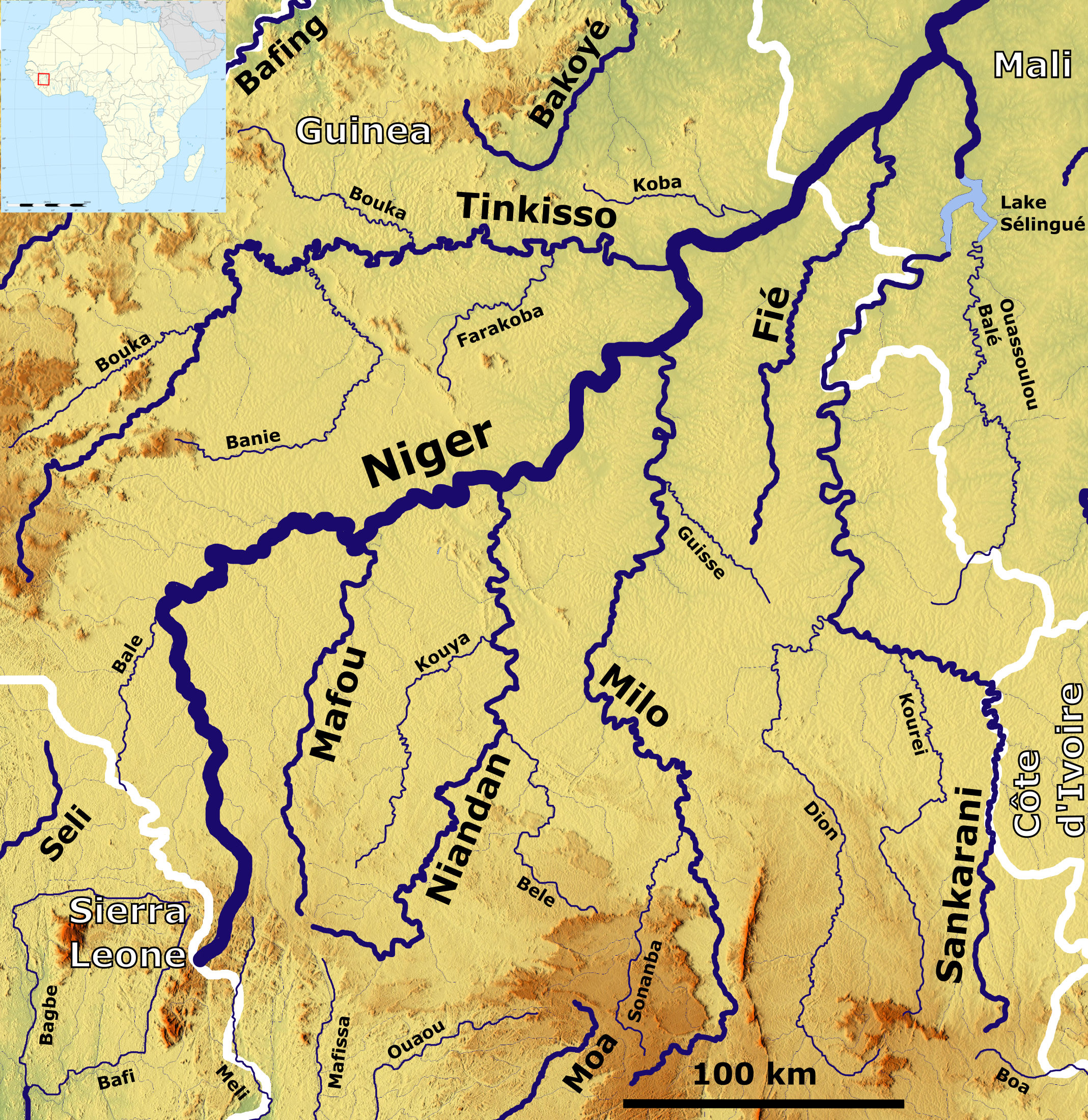
The Upper Niger in Guinea with the Sankarani (right)

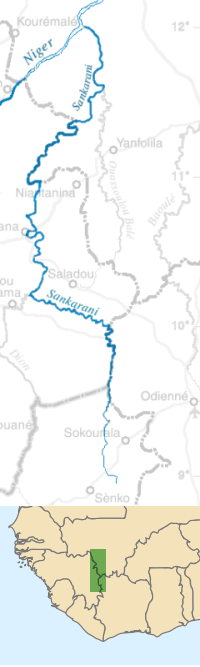

The Sankarani River (French: Fleuve Sankarani) is a tributary of the Niger River. Flowing northward from the Guinea Highlands of the Fouta Djallon in Guinea, it crosses into southern Mali, where it joins the Niger approximately 40 kilometres (25 mi) upstream of Bamako, the capital of Mali. It forms part of the Ivory Coast-Guinea and Guinea–Mali borders.

The Sankarani River watershed, traditionally well suited to crops and rich in iron and gold, covers some 35,500 square kilometres (13,700 sq mi), two-thirds of which are in Guinea, where it is joined by three tributaries: the Kourai, Yeremou and Dion Rivers. In Mali, it flows into the Niger River upstream of Bamako near the village of Kourouba.

Construction of the Sélingué Dam began in 1980, with the goal of supplying Bamako with electricity; it was inaugurated on 13 December 1982. It and the accompanying hydroelectric plant comprised the largest development project in Malian history up to that time. The plant has the capacity to produce 44.8 million kilowatt-hours of electricity. An irrigation scheme was also implemented, initially to compensate people who had to be moved; it covered 1,200 hectares (3,000 acres), split up among 1943 plot holders, or 60,000 hectares (150,000 acres).

The Sankanarni has a discontinuous floodplain over a distance of 170 kilometres (110 mi) in Guinea. The river banks support gallery forests, though the Selingue Dam's reservoir covered many of them. As of 2008, more than a thousand fishermen caught "between 400 and 1000 kg/day in peak season and 10 to 50 kg/day in low season (March to May)" in the section of the river between the dam and the junction with the Niger.

At the height of its power, from the 13th to 16th centuries CE, the capital of the ancient Mali Empire is believed to have been at Niani, on the banks of the Sankarani.
