= Yanfolila Cercle =

Coordinates: 10°55′N 8°05′W

- Cercle
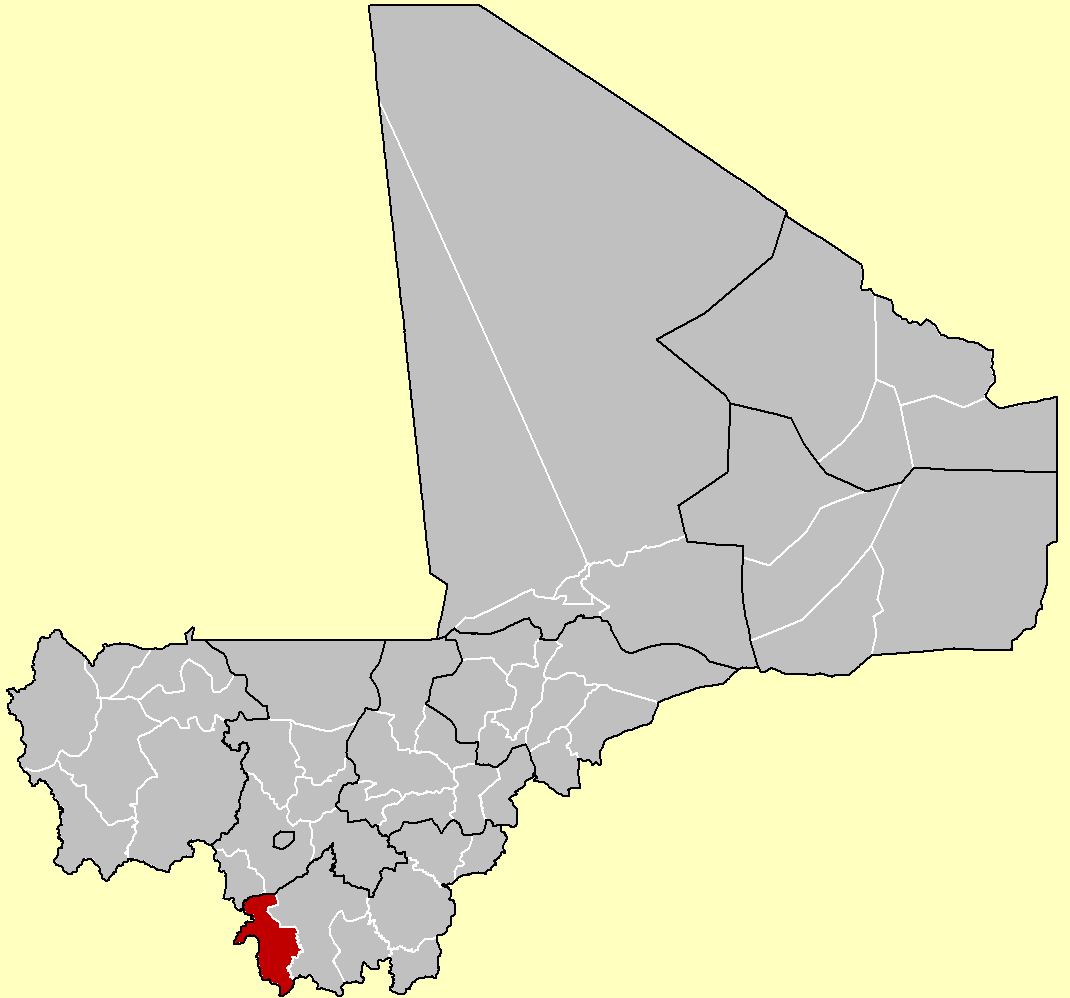
- Location of the Cercle of Yanfolila in Mali
- Country: Mali
- Region: Sikasso Region
- Admin HQ (Chef-lieu): Yanfolila

Area
  - Total: 9,240 km^{2} (3,570 sq mi)

Population (2009 census)
  - Total: 211,824
  - Density: 22.9/km^{2} (59.4/sq mi)
- Time zone: UTC+0 (GMT)

Yanfolila Cercle is an administrative subdivision of the Sikasso Region of southern Mali. The administrative center (chef-lieu) is the town of Yanfolila.

The cercle is divided into 12 communes:

- Baya
- Bolo-Fouta
- Djallon-Foula
- Djiguiya de Koloni
- Gouanan
- Gouandiaka
- Koussan
- Sankarani
- Séré Moussa Ani Samou De Siékorolé
- Tagandougou
- Wassoulou-Ballé
- Yallankoro-Soloba

The town of Yanfolila lies within the rural commune of Wassoulou-Ballé.
