= Yanfolila =

- Town
- Location in Mali
- Coordinates: 11°10′43″N 8°9′20″W
- Country: Mali
- Region: Sikasso Region
- Cercle: Yanfolila Cercle
- Commune: Wassoulou-Ballé
- Time zone: UTC+0 (GMT)

Yanfolila is a town and seat of both the Yanfolila Cercle and the Wassoulou-Ballé rural commune in the Sikasso Region of southern Mali. The town lies 272 km west of Sikasso, 164 km south of Bamako and 23 km from the border with Guinea.
