= Arame Diène =

Senegalese activist and politician (1926-2005)

- Born: 1926
- Died: 2005 (aged 78–79)
- Occupations: Activist and politician

Arame Diène (1926–2005) was a Senegalese activist and politician and a self-made woman. Born in the Lebou ethnic group, Diène family home is located in the popular quarter of Medina in Dakar.

== Education ==
Diène did not attend French schools, the lack of schooling was based on the Lebous culture: girls were not allowed to attend school. Society counted her out they categorized her as illiterate and traditionally destined to remain at home.

== Career ==
Diène entered politics in 1945, following family tradition; her parents were notable Lebous supporters of Alfred Goux. Diene's husband was a member of the Socialist Party of Senegal. She was a member of the Senegalese Democratic Bloc before joining the Socialist Party of Senegal in 1947 with her husband. Diène is considered the mother of Socialist Party.

In 1981, Prime Minister Abdou Diouf defeated Leopold Sedar Senghor as president. She was elected to the National Assembly in 1983 alongside Ramatoulaye Seck and Aïda Mbaye; all three women became known for their political abilities despite a lack of formal education. Said to be the first person to speak Wolof on the floor of the National Assembly, she was the first illiterate woman elected to that body. Diène served thirty-seven years of service to politics, changing political power structures.

== Personal life ==
She has been referred to by some as the "mother" of the Senegalese Socialist Party, and played a significant role in its women's movement, heading the women's section of the party and the regional party organization in Cap-Vert. She limited her participation during sessions of the Assembly, speaking about issues affecting farmers, women, children, and health; she preferred not to speak about defense and financial matters.
