= Government of Senegal =

- Central government

Overview
- Established: 25 November 1958; 66 years ago
- State: Senegal
- Leader: President (Bassirou Diomaye Faye)
- Website: www.sec.gouv.sn (in French)

The Government of Senegal (French: Gouvernement du Sénégal) is the union government created by the constitution of Senegal, consisting of the executive, parliament, and judiciary. The Seat of the Government is located in Dakar. The government is led by the president (currently Bassirou Diomaye Faye).

== Executive branch ==
The president is elected by popular vote for a five-year term. The Council of Ministers is appointed by the president. The 2001 constitution introduced a two-term limit for the president; a March 2016 referendum restored the presidential term to five years from seven.

== Legislative branch ==
The National Assembly (Assemblée Nationale) comprises 165 members elected for five-year terms by parallel voting. Of these, 90 are elected by plurality vote in single and multi-seat constituencies across Senegal, with a further 15 elected from overseas voters. The remaining 60 elected through proportional representation. The Senate, an indirectly elected upper chamber, was abolished in 2012, leaving a unicameral system.

== Politics ==
Politics in Senegal takes place within the framework of a presidential democratic republic. The president is the head of state and government. Executive power in Senegal is concentrated in the president's hands.

== Judicial branch ==
The nation's highest courts that deal with business issues are the constitutional council and the Court of Cassation, members of which are named by the president.

== Administrative divisions ==
Senegal is subdivided into 13 regions (régions, singular – région):

Dakar, Diourbel, Fatick, Kaolack, Kédougou, Kolda, Louga, Matam, Saint-Louis, Sédhiou, Tambacounda, Thiès, Ziguinchor. Local administrators are all appointed by and responsible to the President.

== International relations ==
Senegal joined with the Gambia to form the nominal confederation of Senegambia in 1982. However, the envisaged integration of the two countries was never carried out, and the union was dissolved in 1989. Despite peace talks, a separatist group in the southern Casamance region has sporadically clashed with government forces since 1982. Senegal has a long history of participating in international peacekeeping.

Senegal is a member of ACCT, ACP, AfDB, ECA, ECOWAS, FAO, FZ, G-15, G-77, IAEA, IBRD, ICAO, ICCt, ICC, ICFTU, ICRM, IDA, IDB, IFAD, IFC, IFRCS, ILO, IMF, IMO, Inmarsat, Intelsat, Interpol, IOC, IOM, ITU, MIPONUH, NAM, OAU, OIC, OPCW, PCA, UN, UNCTAD, UNESCO, UNIDO, UNIKOM, UNMIBH, UNMIK, UNTAET, UPU, WADB, WAEMU, WCL, WCO, WFTU, WHO, WIPO, WMO, WToO, and WTrO.

Senegal has acted as a mediator between Sudan and Chad over the crisis in Darfur.

== See also ==
- Politics of Senegal
