= 1988 Senegalese general election =

- 28 February 1988
- Presidential election
- Turnout: 58.77%
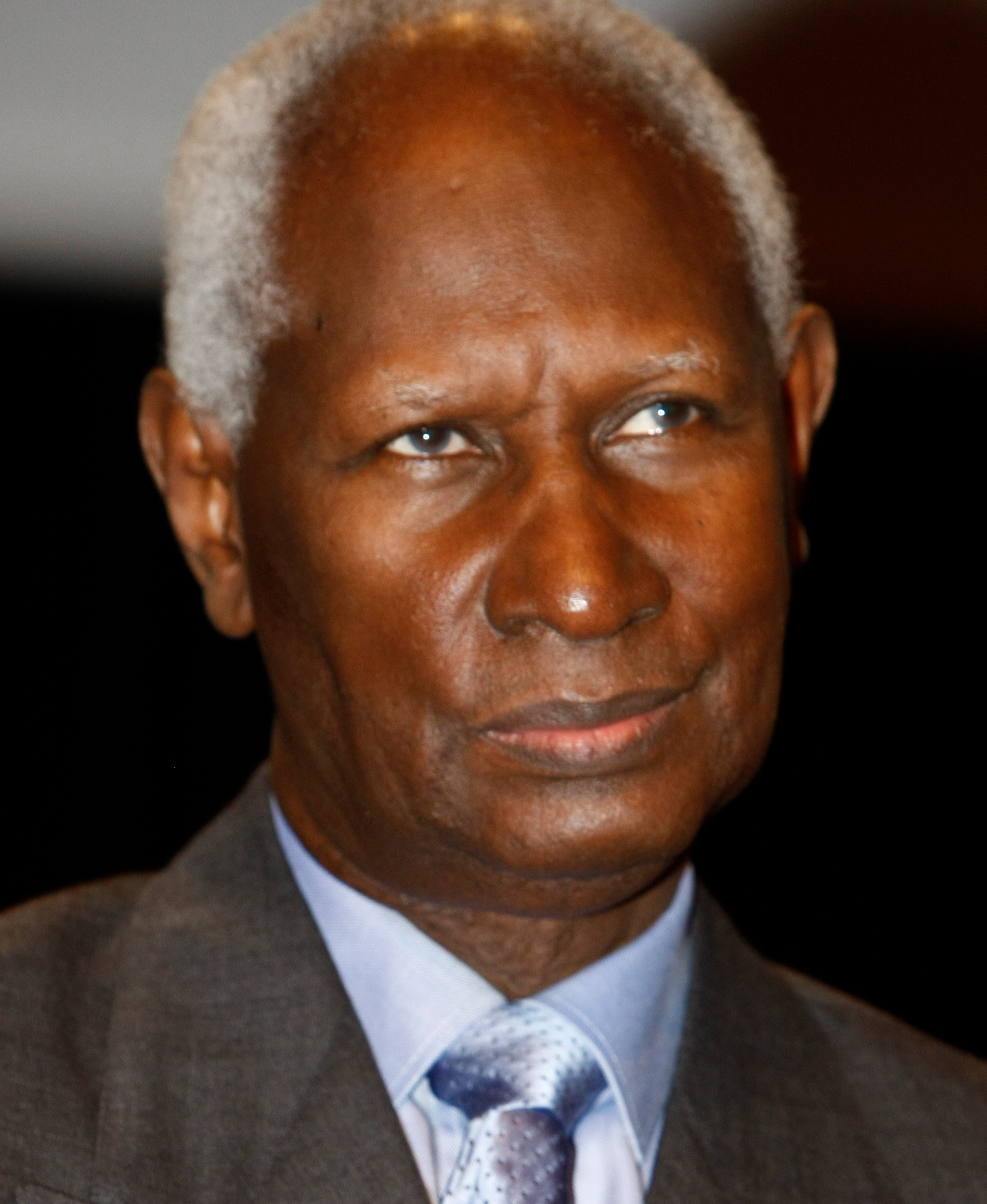

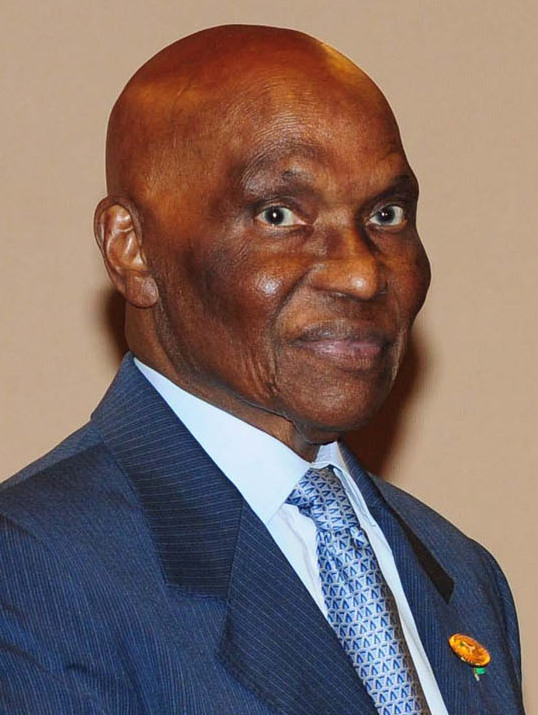
Candidate	Abdou Diouf	Abdoulaye Wade
Party	PS	PDS
Popular vote	828,301	291,869
Percentage	73.21%	25.80%
President before election
Abdou Diouf
PS
Elected President
Abdou Diouf
PS
- Parliamentary election
- Turnout: 57.87%
Party	Leader	Vote %	Seats	+/–
PS	Abdou Diouf	71.34	103	−8
PDS	Abdoulaye Wade	24.74	17	+9
This lists parties that won seats. See the complete results below.

General elections were held in Senegal on 28 February 1988 to elect a president and National Assembly. Incumbent president Abdou Diouf defeated three other candidates in the presidential election, whilst in the National Assembly election Diouf's Socialist Party won 103 of the 120 seats. Voter turnout was 58% in the Assembly election and 59% in the presidential election.

Public disorder broke out during the election. President Diouf declared a state of emergency amid riots. Supporters of Wade made accusations that the election was fraudulent. Wade described the results as "ridiculous."

== Results ==
=== President ===
Candidate	Party	Votes	%
Abdou Diouf	Socialist Party	828,301	73.21
Abdoulaye Wade	Senegalese Democratic Party	291,869	25.80
Babacar Niang	Party for the Liberation of the People	8,449	0.75
Landing Savané	And-Jëf/Revolutionary Movement for New Democracy	2,849	0.25
Total		1,131,468	100.00
Valid votes		1,131,468	99.64
Invalid/blank votes		4,033	0.36
Total votes		1,135,501	100.00
Registered voters/turnout		1,932,265	58.77
Source: African Elections Database

=== National Assembly ===
Party	Votes	%	Seats	+/–
Socialist Party	794,559	71.34	103	–8
Senegalese Democratic Party	275,552	24.74	17	+8
Democratic League/Movement for the Labour Party	15,664	1.41	0	0
Party for the Liberation of the People	13,186	1.18	0	New
Party of Independence and Labour	9,304	0.84	0	0
Senegalese Democratic Party – Renewal	5,481	0.49	0	New
Total	1,113,746	100.00	120	0
Valid votes	1,113,746	99.60		
Invalid/blank votes	4,500	0.40		
Total votes	1,118,246	100.00		
Registered voters/turnout	1,932,265	57.87		
Source: African Elections Database
