= Aïda Mbaye =

Senegalese politician

- Born: Saint-Louis, Senegal
- Citizenship: Senegalese
- Occupation: Politician
- Known for: One of three women elected to the National Assembly in 1983 despite lack of formal education
- Office: Member of the National Assembly
- Political party: Socialist Party of Senegal

Aïda Mbaye was a Senegalese politician.

Alongside Arame Diène and Ramatoulaye Seck, Mbaye was elected to the National Assembly in the 1983 general election; all three women became known for their political abilities despite a lack of formal education. A native of Saint-Louis, she was a member of the Socialist Party of Senegal and served as an official for the regional union of Tambacounda at the time of her nomination and election.
