= Ramatoulaye Seck =

Senegalese politician

Ramatoulaye Seck was a Senegalese politician.

Alongside Arame Diène and Aïda Mbaye, Seck was elected to the National Assembly in 1983; all three women became known for their political abilities despite a lack of formal education. She was a member of the Socialist Party of Senegal, and was nominated by the local party union as a substitute for Diène, alongside whom she was elected.
