= Democracy in Senegal =

The democracy in Senegal was touted as one of the more stable democracies in Africa, with a long tradition of peaceful democratic discourse. Democratization proceeded gradually from 1970s to 1990s.

Events surrounding the 2019 election have given rise to growing concerns. Opposition leaders have been arrested on what some see as trumped-up charges and subsequent demonstrations have been met with lethal force. The 2024 Senegalese presidential election was postponed by a decree of the outgoing President Macky Sall on 3 February. In a sign of resilience of democracy in Senegal the Senegalese Constitutional Council ordered the presidential election to be held as soon as possible and was held accordingly on 24 March 2024. The result of this election was confirmed both by the second placed presidential candidate Amadou Ba and the Senegal's Supreme Court.

As of 2024, Senegal was the 10th most electoral democratic country in Africa according to V-Dem Democracy indices.

== Early dominance by the Parti Socialiste ==
When Senegal became independent from French colonialism, a rather liberal electoral tradition was left behind that set Senegal apart from other countries gaining their independence at the time. Leopold Senghor's Union Progressiste Senegalaise (UPS) was positioned to facilitate a one-party hegemonic state at the moment of Senegal's independence. In 1962, a split within the UPS left the Parti Socialiste (PS) in power; Senghor established a plurality winner-take-all formula for national elections that effectively ensured one-party rule in the clientelist context. However, local elections employing the same formula were disrupted by rural unrest stemming from economic failures. The PS introduced limited reforms that led to the registration of its eventual rival, the Parti Democratique Senegalaise (PDS). Further, in 1976, Senghor, wishing to leave a democratic legacy in Senegal, amended the constitution to promote a three-party system.

In 1978, the PS faced a growing threat from Cheikh Anta Diop and his party, the Rassemblement National Democratique (RND). Senghor again turned to democratic reforms to buttress his political legitimacy: the 1978 election saw 100 seats in the legislature determined by proportional representation (PR), and recognized three parties on the ballot (including the PDS, but notably excluding the RND). The three recognized parties were given stringent ideological platforms, to which they were constitutionally obligated to adhere. While the immediate impact of this was to extend Senghor's term in power and reinforce the ruling PS, the 1978 reforms also created the first official opposition party, greatly increasing the resources available to the PDS.

The dominance of the PS was borne of their political strategy, which combined a co-optation of liberal and democratic reforms with a systematic dependence on patronage networks inherited from the colonial era. Early leadership of the Senegalese party-state (including Senghor) avoided the military repression that plagued other early African democracies by becoming "patrimonial democrats" and liberalizing the country without dismantling the clientelist networks that kept the ruling party in power.

Abdou Diouf succeeded Senghor as President and head of the PS in 1981. Fearing mounting opposition from the PDS, Diouf revised the constitution again in 1983, this time eliminating the maximum number of parties to be recognized on the ballot. This reform again had mixed impacts: it allowed smaller opposition parties a greater opportunity to gain control over seats in the legislature, but also precluded coordination between opposition factions, enabling a sweeping victory for Diouf's PS in elections later that year.

== Coalition government reforms ==
Elections in 1988 followed the same pattern, but a stronger showing from the PDS forced Diouf to engage in short-lived unified government with his rival, Abdoulaye Wade. This yielded additional official resources to the PDS and led to further election reforms against Diouf's preferences. These reforms included lowering the voting age from 21 to 18, guaranteeing a secret ballot, representing all parties at polling stations, simplifying the voter registration process, guaranteeing all parties access to state media, and accepting foreign election monitors. Other procedural changes were brought about: the number of seats decided by PR was increased by 10, all of which came from the seats previously decided by plurality, and the first round of presidential elections was changed to require a minimum of 25% of the vote to decide a winner. In exchange for these changes, the presidential term was increased from 5 years to 7 years, separating future presidential elections from legislative contests and ostensibly ensuring extended control over the office for Diouf.

== The Sopi Revolution ==
Growing discontent with the PS throughout the 1990s led to the growth of the opposition party under Abdoulaye Wade. Wade built a platform promising sopi (a Wolof word meaning change), invoking certain institutional reforms desired by much of the country but systematically blocked by the PS in its first 30 years of independence. The 2000 election saw Wade into power and marked the first transition of power between opposing parties, a major step towards the theoretical consolidation of Senegalese democracy. Turnout in this election was 63%, and as the PS found itself unable to realistically battle electoral reforms, the opposition led by the PDS constructed a uniquely effective coalition that led to a transition of power in a free and fair election.

Despite an auspicious election in 2000, the sopi coalition in government did not live up to expectations. Wade revised the constitution in 2001, a mostly symbolic gesture; the only major change was a shortened presidential term, and the electoral procedures for the legislature were still designed to favor the ruling party. Wade's coalition won only 49.6% of the vote in the 2001 parliamentary election, yet secured nearly 3 in 4 seats. Wade made further attempts to consolidate power that were broadly opposed by the public. He repeatedly argued that the two-term limit on the presidency introduced under the 2001 constitution did not apply to his first term, since he was elected prior to its ratification. He also attempted to lower the vote percentage required to decide a victor in the first round of the presidential election, which would have made it easier for the PDS to prevent opposition coalitions from forming.

== Macky Sall ==
Wade won a second term in 2007, but lost in 2012 due to controversy over the legality of a third presidential term and the failure of his administration to pursue policies extending beyond valence issues. Macky Sall took over as President, bringing the Alliance pour la Republique (APR) to power and consolidating Senegal's democracy with two peaceful transitions post-election. However, the value of this consolidation has been questioned due to the wide margins by which the critical elections were won; vote margins of 41% in 2000 and 32% in 2012 are too great to comfortably declare these elections competitive.

== Local government ==
From 1972 to 1984, the national government in Senegal began introducing local councils as a "safety valve" of governance. These local councils demonstrated some of the early principles of democratization through decentralization that would later become prominent among reformists, but were not designed primarily for this purpose. Rather, the councils were subject to the veto of the national government over most of their decisions, and could even be dissolved involuntarily.

As local government came to be seen as inherently more democratic than centralized government, leaders in Senegal attempted to exert control over those elected to local office. Candidates for local election had to be presented by national parties through 1996. This allowed the ruling PS to secure a majority of seats in local government as well as dominate the national government. One consequence of this was that PS renouvellements (local party elections) have been fiercely contested; several have generated violent conflict.

Senegal is noteworthy in that localities do not tend to be distinctly partisan. This fact combines with the clientelist dynamic present in Senegal and shared in many neopatrimonial regimes to encourage electoral targeting of village units. Because local figures wield significant customary authority over their domains, the local village can be treated as a bloc whose interests are pursued by local political and religious leaders. When a village is well-organized at the local level and is capable of expressing a clear electoral consensus despite the lack of party loyalty, national politicians are incentivized to target the village in their campaigns more than villages that can not coordinate political action in such a manner. This results in a pattern by which non-partisan local communities that vote for the opposition are courted by the ruling party over the subsequent term, encouraging the locality to vote in the other direction in any immediately subsequent elections. Further, this dynamic promotes support for incumbents in rural areas, even when incumbents pursue policies that benefit residents of urban areas more (which is typically the case in Senegal). Because electoral support does not demonstrate strong partisan ties and is mostly dependent on clientelist exchange with local customary authorities, and because customary authority is more concentrated and pronounced in rural areas, rural voters more frequently vote for the party in power despite a lack of genuine electoral incentive to do so.

== Sufi Islam and democratization ==
Local government in Senegal since the 1990s has been described as "decentralized despotism," with reference to the manipulation of the clientelist dynamic by local religious leaders to reproduce socio-political authority. Sufi clerics, or marabouts, have attempted to leverage their following to enforce taxes and obtain political power on the local scale. For example, the city of Touba is effectively a "state within a state," wherein the customary authority of the khalife and Sufi marabouts overrides the legal authority of institutions of government. Maraboutic authority has survived in modern Senegal because the customary cultural identities that yield them authority are used equally by local urban and rural politicians to bridge-build with their constituencies. After Abdoulaye Wade won the 2000 presidential election, his first act was to visit Touba, continuing to promote strong clientelist ties to customary leaders.

In recent years, the development of a limited civil society has occurred alongside the proliferation of clientelist networks that cement customary local authorities. Literacy groups, youth groups, women's associations, and economic interest groups such as daahira, religious self-help groups formed in urban Senegal to support migrants. The Hizbut Tarqiyya daahira in Dakar has funded infrastructure projects and organized exhibitions for the history of Mouridism. Through such organizational structures, Sufi Islam in Senegal has traditionally been a stabilizing force in politics and a check on arbitrary government power. By advocating for Islam, religious leaders also (somewhat accidentally) played a crucial role in the democratization of the country from the 1990s onward. This is at least partially because Senegal has historically been one of the most religious countries in the world; a 2010 Pew survey found 98% of Senegal's population believe religion is very important to their lives. Consequently, the tensions that might normally exist between religious institutions and democratic ideals tangential to secularism are set aside by local religious figures, since they can be confident the role of religion will not be significantly diminished.

Marabouts played substantial roles in much of the democratization Senegal experienced in the 1990s and 2000s. In 1993, the decision of the khalife of the Mouride order not to endorse Abdou Diouf led to a substantial decrease in Diouf's support in subsequent elections. Entering the 2000 election, religious figures even delved directly into politics: Moustapha Sy of the Moustarchidine order founded the Parti de l’Unité et du Rassemblement (PUR).

== See also ==
- Elections in Senegal

== Bibliography ==
- Beck, Linda J (2001-10-01). "Reining in the Marabouts? Democratization and Local Governance in Senegal". African Affairs. 100 (401): 601–621.
- Mozaffar, S.; Vengroff, R. (2002–12). "A 'whole system' approach to the choice of electoral rules in democratizing countries:". Electoral Studies. 21 (4): 601–616.
- Villalón, Leonardo A. (2015-04-23). "Cautious Democrats: Religious Actors and Democratization Processes in Senegal". Politics and Religion. 8 (2): 305–333.
- Adebayo, A. G. (Akanmu Gafari), (2012). Managing conflicts in Africa's democratic transitions. Lexington Books.
- Fatton, Robert (1986). "The Democratization of Senegal (1976–1983): "Passive Revolution" and the Democratic Limits of Liberal Democracy". Review (Fernand Braudel Center). 10: 279–312.
- Grépin, Karen A. (2013). "Democratization and Universal Health Coverage: A Case Comparison of Ghana, Kenya, and Senegal" (PDF). Global Health Governance. 6.
- Gottlieb, Jessica (2020). "An Informational Theory of Electoral Targeting in Young Clientelistic Democracies: Evidence from Senegal". Quarterly Journal of Political Science. 15: 73–104.
- Fatton, Robert (1986–12). "Clientelism and Patronage in Senegal". African Studies Review. 29 (4): 61.
- Beck, Linda J. (Linda. 'Patrimonial democrats' in a culturally plural society : democratization and political accommodation in the patronage politics of Senegal.
- Koter, Dominika (2013-11-18). "Urban and rural voting patterns in Senegal: the spatial aspects of incumbency, c. 1978–2012". The Journal of Modern African Studies. 51 (4): 653–679.
