= 1978 Senegalese general election =

- 26 February 1978
- Presidential election
- Turnout: 63.12%
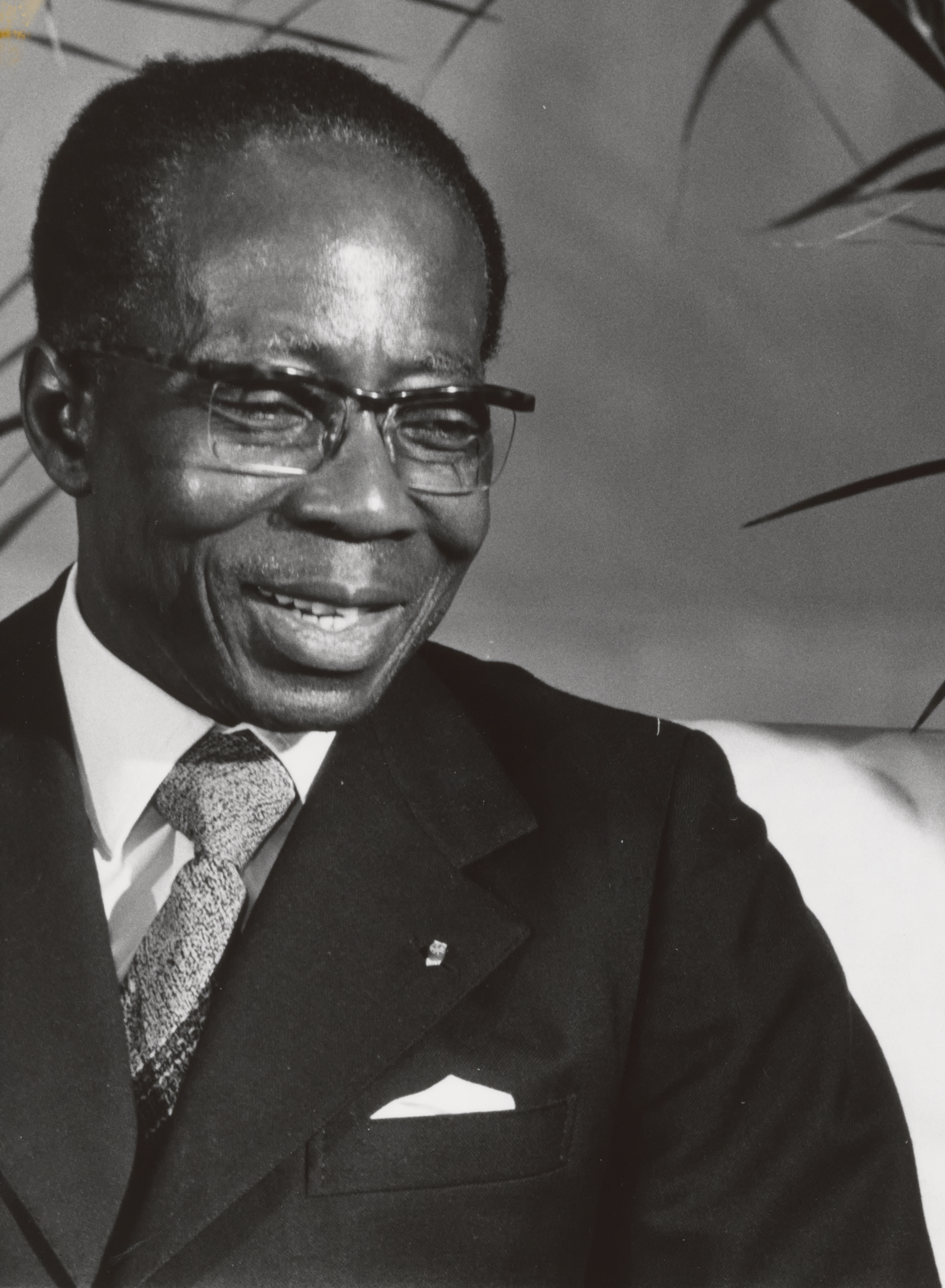

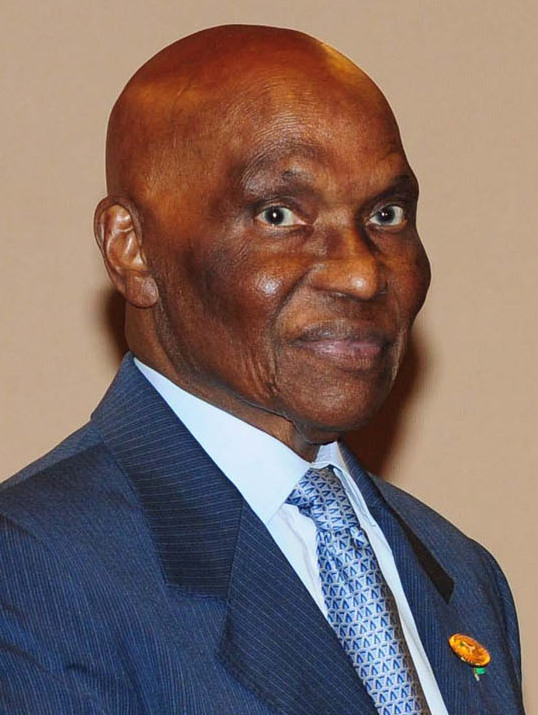
Candidate	Léopold Sédar Senghor	Abdoulaye Wade
Party	PS	PDS
Popular vote	807,515	174,817
Percentage	82.20%	17.80%
- Results by region
President before election
Léopold Sédar Senghor
PS
Elected President
Léopold Sédar Senghor
PS
- Parliamentary election
- Turnout: 62.64%
Party	Leader	Vote %	Seats	+/–
PS	Léopold Sédar Senghor	81.74	82	−18
PDS	Abdoulaye Wade	17.88	18	New
This lists parties that won seats. See the complete results below.

General elections were held in Senegal on 26 February 1978 to elect a president and National Assembly. Following a constitutional amendment in 1976, the elections were open to more than one party for the first time since 1963. President Léopold Sédar Senghor of the Socialist Party (formerly the Senegalese Progressive Union) was challenged by Abdoulaye Wade of the Senegalese Democratic Party, but won with 82% of the vote. Members of the National Assembly were elected by closed-list proportional representation. In the National Assembly election, the Socialist Party won 82 of the 100 seats. Voter turnout was 63%.

== Results ==
=== President ===
Candidate	Party	Votes	%
Léopold Sédar Senghor	Socialist Party	807,515	82.20
Abdoulaye Wade	Senegalese Democratic Party	174,817	17.80
Total		982,332	100.00
Valid votes		982,332	99.37
Invalid/blank votes		6,234	0.63
Total votes		988,566	100.00
Registered voters/turnout		1,566,250	63.12
Source: Nohlen et al.

=== National Assembly ===
Party	Votes	%	Seats	+/–
Socialist Party	790,799	81.74	82	–18
Senegalese Democratic Party	172,948	17.88	18	New
African Independence Party	3,734	0.39	0	New
Total	967,481	100.00	100	0
Valid votes	967,481	99.25		
Invalid/blank votes	7,344	0.75		
Total votes	974,825	100.00		
Registered voters/turnout	1,556,250	62.64		
Source: Nohlen et al.
