= Socialists United for Renaissance of Senegal =

Socialists United for Renaissance of Senegal (French: Les Socialistes Unis pour la Renaissance du Sénégal) is a political party in Senegal. The president of the party is Abdoulaye Makhtar Diop. The party was registered on May 24, 2004.

Diop, a dissident leader of the Socialist Party, aligned his party with the government of Senegal in May 2006.
