= Moustapha Lô =

Moustapha Lô (died 15 June 1967) was a Senegalese man who attempted to assassinate Senegalese President Léopold Sédar Senghor on 22 March 1967 at the Dakar Grand Mosque. Lô pointed his pistol towards Senghor after he had participated in the sermon of Tabaski, but the gun did not fire. Lô was convicted of treason, was sentenced to death by a Senegalese court and was executed by firing squad. Lô was the second of two people who have been executed by Senegal since its independence in 1960.
