= 1959 Senegalese parliamentary election =

Parliamentary elections were held in Senegal on 22 March 1959. The result was a victory for the Senegalese Progressive Union, which won all 80 seats. Voter turnout was 74%.

== Results ==
Party	Votes	%	Seats	+/–
Senegalese Progressive Union	682,865	82.99	80	+20
Senegalese Solidarity Party	99,330	12.07	0	New
African Regroupment Party – Senegal	40,270	4.89	0	New
Independents	347	0.04	0	New
Total	822,812	100.00	80	+20
Valid votes	822,812	99.83		
Invalid/blank votes	1,417	0.17		
Total votes	824,229	100.00		
Registered voters/turnout	1,107,057	74.45		
Source: African Elections Database
