= L'Unité africaine =

A man holding L'Unité africaine in Dakar in 1962.

L'Unité africaine was the main organ of the Senegalese Progressive Union. It was published monthly between 1958 and 1984. In 1984 it was replaced by L'Unité pour le socialisme.
