= 1968 Senegalese general election =

- 25 February 1968
- Presidential election
- Turnout: 94.69%
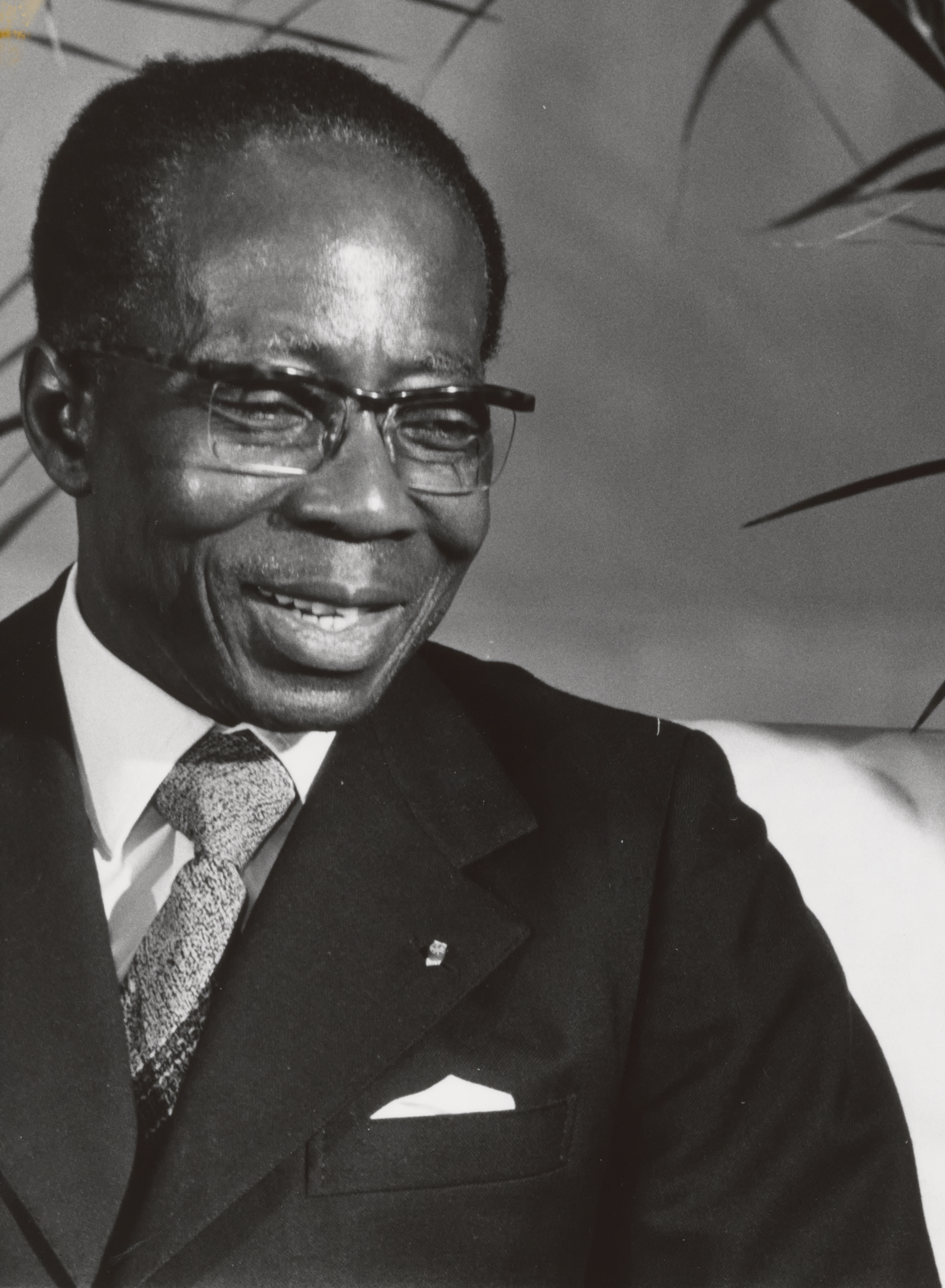
Candidate	Léopold Sédar Senghor
Party	UPS
Popular vote	1,229,927
Percentage	100%
President before election
Léopold Sédar Senghor
UPS
Elected President
Léopold Sédar Senghor
UPS
- Parliamentary election
- Turnout: 93.03%
Party	Leader	Vote %	Seats	+/–
UPS	Léopold Sédar Senghor	100	80	0
This lists parties that won seats. See the complete results below.

General elections were held in Senegal on 25 February 1968 to elect a President and National Assembly. After a series of party mergers, the country had become a one-party state, with the Senegalese Progressive Union (UPS) as the sole legal party, As a result, its leader, Léopold Sédar Senghor, was the only candidate in the presidential election and was re-elected unopposed. In the National Assembly election, voters were presented with a list of 80 UPS candidates to vote for. Voter turnout was 95% in the presidential election and 93% in the National Assembly election.

== Results ==
=== President ===
Candidate	Party	Votes	%
Léopold Sédar Senghor	Senegalese Progressive Union	1,229,927	100.00
Total		1,229,927	100.00
Valid votes		1,229,927	99.39
Invalid/blank votes		7,504	0.61
Total votes		1,237,431	100.00
Registered voters/turnout		1,306,791	94.69
Source: Sternberger et al.

=== National Assembly ===
Party	Votes	%	Seats	+/–
Senegalese Progressive Union	1,209,984	100.00	80	0
Total	1,209,984	100.00	80	0
Valid votes	1,209,984	99.53		
Invalid/blank votes	5,746	0.47		
Total votes	1,215,730	100.00		
Registered voters/turnout	1,306,791	93.03		
Source: Sternberger et al.
