= 1973 Senegalese general election =

- 28 January 1973
- Presidential election
- Turnout: 96.99%
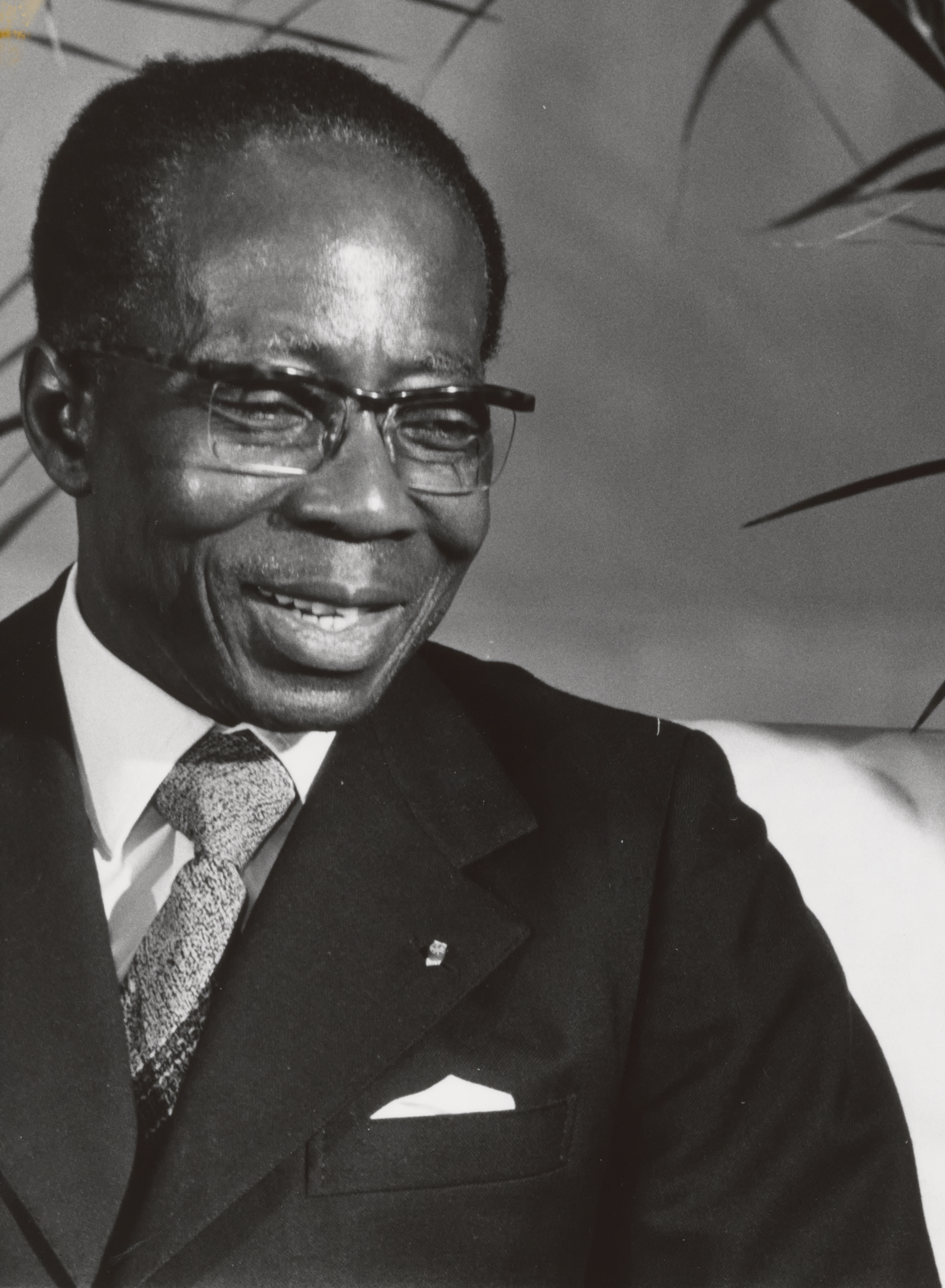
Candidate	Léopold Sédar Senghor
Party	UPS
Popular vote	1,357,056
Percentage	100%
President before election
Léopold Sédar Senghor
UPS
Elected President
Léopold Sédar Senghor
UPS
- Parliamentary election
- Turnout: 96.90%
Party	Leader	Vote %	Seats	+/–
UPS	Léopold Sédar Senghor	100	100	+20
This lists parties that won seats. See the complete results below.

General elections were held in Senegal on 28 January 1973 to elect a President and National Assembly. At the time the country was a one-party state, with the Senegalese Progressive Union (UPS) as the sole legal party, As a result, its leader, Léopold Sédar Senghor, was the only candidate in the presidential election and was re-elected unopposed. In the National Assembly election, voters were presented with a list of 100 UPS candidates (for the 100 seats) to vote for. Voter turnout was 97%.

== Results ==
=== President ===
Candidate	Party	Votes	%
Léopold Sédar Senghor	Senegalese Progressive Union	1,357,056	100.00
Total		1,357,056	100.00
Valid votes		1,357,056	99.98
Invalid/blank votes		303	0.02
Total votes		1,357,359	100.00
Registered voters/turnout		1,399,433	96.99
Source: Nohlen et al.

=== National Assembly ===
Party	Votes	%	Seats	+/–
Senegalese Progressive Union	1,355,306	100.00	100	+20
Total	1,355,306	100.00	100	+20
Valid votes	1,355,306	99.94		
Invalid/blank votes	793	0.06		
Total votes	1,356,099	100.00		
Registered voters/turnout	1,399,433	96.90		
Source: Nohlen et al.
