= L'Unité pour le socialisme =

L'Unité pour le socialisme is the main organ of the Socialist Party in Senegal. The magazine is published monthly since 1984. Its headquarters is in Dakar. It is the successor of L'Unité africaine which had been published monthly between 1958 and 1984.
