= 2016 Senegalese constitutional referendum =

- 20 March 2016

Results
Choice	Votes	%
Yes	1,367,592	62.64%
No	815,655	37.36%
Valid votes	2,183,247	99.10%
Invalid or blank votes	19,815	0.90%
Total votes	2,203,062	100.00%
Registered voters/turnout	5,709,582	38.59%

A constitutional referendum was held in Senegal on 20 March 2016. Proposed by President Macky Sall, it was the fourth constitutional referendum in Senegalese history. The proposed changes to the constitution were approved by 62% of voters. Voter turnout was 39%. A majority voted in favour in thirteen of the fourteen regions, with only Diourbel Region seeing a majority against.

== Background ==
Fifteen points were proposed to change the constitution which were discussed at a forum with Sall, religious and political leaders, as well as civil society, starting on 28 May 2016. Some opposition leaders did not attend the forum for multiple reasons, including that they believed the forum should have been held prior to the referendum. Sall's stated purpose for the referendum was "to reinforce our already great democracy and also to give a new dimension to our rights." Sall had run his campaign partially on the platform of constitutional reform and shortening the presidential term. In 2013 Senegal created a National Commission for Institutional Reform (CNRI) which had originally proposed a new draft of the constitution with 154 articles. However, this was rejected and replaced with the accepted 15 changes.

The referendum was received by some international observers as a move of progress towards democracy in politics in Sub-Saharan Africa in context with other referendums in the region that extended executive powers and term limits, such as a 2015 referendum in Rwanda and another 2015 referendum in the Republic of the Congo extending term limits. However, Sall was criticised for not shortening his own term despite the fact that the Constitutional Court had previously ruled that he could not change the term limits until he finished his term in 2019. During the campaigns prior to the referendum, opposition urged the public to vote no, claiming it was "meaningless" because the court had already voted that Sall would stay in office until 2019. Others criticised him for not explaining the proposals sufficiently before the vote occurred, therefore causing some to blame a perceived low voter turnout on the lack of clarity. Some debated whether or not this ruling by the court was actually binding or simply a suggestion. The legitimacy of the constitution has been criticised by various scholars, citing constitutional instability due to the high volume of constitutional amendments.

== Constitutional amendments ==
A total of 15 changes were proposed to the constitution:

1. Modernising the role of political parties in the democratic system
2. The participation of independent candidates in all types of elections
3. The promotion of local governance and of territorial development by creating the High Council of Local Authorities
4. Recognition of new rights for citizens: right to a healthy environment on their land holdings and their natural resources
5. The strengthening of citizenship by the consecration of the duty of the citizen
6. The restoration of the five-year term for the presidential mandate
7. Strengthening the rights of the opposition and its leader
8. Representation of Senegalese abroad by having their own dedicated deputies
9. The extension of the powers of the National Assembly in matters of monitoring government action and evaluating policies publicly
10. The submission to the Constitutional Council of organic laws for constitutional review before their promulgation
11. Increase in the number of members of the Constitutional Council from five to seven
12. The designation, by the president of the National Assembly, of two of the seven members of the Constitutional Council
13. The extension of the powers of the Constitutional Council to give opinions and hear exceptions of unconstitutionality raised before the Court of Appeal
14. The constitutionalisation of the principles of decentralisation and de-concentration
15. The intangibility of the provisions relating to the republican form, to secularism, with the indivisible, democratic and decentralised character of the state, the mode of election, the duration and the number of mandates consecutive years of the president of the republic.

=== Modernising the role of political parties ===
Article 4 was expanded, adding more rules and guidelines for political parties. One addition states that parties based on "one race, to one ethnicity, to one sex, to one religion, to one sect, to one language or to one part of the territory" are prohibited.

=== Participation of independent candidates in all types of elections ===
Before the referendum, independent candidates were unable to run in both legislative and local elections.

=== Creation of the High Council of Local Authorities ===
To some, part of the change represents a rebirth of the former Senate which was abolished in 2012. The decision to make the bicameral system unicameral came from the need to pay for the expensive damages caused by flooding in the country.

=== Recognition of new rights for citizens and the strengthening of the duty of the citizen ===
Subsections 25-1, 25-2, and 25-3 were added after article 25. The first two sentences of Article 25-1 state: "The natural resources belong to the people. They are used for the amelioration of the conditions of life." The first sentence of Article 25-2 states, "Each has the right to a healthy environment." The first sentence of Article 25-3 states, "Every citizen is held to scrupulously protect the Constitution, the laws and regulations, notably, to accomplish their civic duties and to respect the rights of others." It also states every citizen must defend the country against aggression, corruption, and misappropriation. Some also saw this as the potential for legalising same-sex marriage, which is currently criminalised, because of the vague wording.

=== Shortening of presidential term ===
When elected in 2012, incumbent president Macky Sall had promised on the campaign trail to shorten the presidential term back from seven years to five years which would reverse a 2008 Constitutional Revision from the previous president, Abdoulaye Wade. Contrary to the promise Sall made to end his mandate in 2017, the shortening of the presidential term would only apply for the next presidential election in 2019 onwards and therefore allowing him to finish his seven-year term. This led decision led to some to criticise his reversed promise. However, the Constitutional Court had ruled before the referendum took place that he could not shorten his term limit until he finished his first term in 2019.

=== Strengthening the rights of the opposition ===
Article 58 states: "The law defines this status and establishes the rights and duties accruing to them as well as to the Head of the opposition."

=== Deputies abroad ===
The following sentence was added to Article 59 of the Constitution: "The Senegalese abroad elect Deputies." The original bill only added 10 new deputies to represent Senegalese abroad, however, 15 new deputies were added in the end. Two new constituencies in Europe, one in the Americas and Oceania, one in Asia and the Middle East, and four others across Africa were added in order to elect the new deputies, with a total of eight new constituencies globally, adding to the 45 current domestic Departments of Senegal. Citizens directly elect their one representative based on where they are living. Citizens directly elect their one representative in person at a polling station in the nation where they live. Europe has six deputy seats, other parts of Africa have seven seats, and the Americas and Oceania have one combined seat as well as Asia and the Middle East.

In 2019, there were 310,000 registered diaspora voters in 49 countries. Current estimates of diaspora populations range between 550,000 and 2.5 million people. The diaspora mainly resides in Western Europe, Sub-Saharan Africa, North America, and some in North Africa and the Middle East, with the main countries of residence being France, Italy, and the Gambia. Voters abroad have typically been active in France, Italy, the United States, Spain, and Gabon. In 2017, financial flows from the diaspora population accounted for 13% of the Gross Domestic Product, mounting to 2.2 billion US dollars. The diaspora tends to have significant influence in Senegalese elections, either through direct voting or engaging with connections back home.

Some opposition in the Senegalese Democratic Party (PDS) resisted the increase of seats in the National Assembly. The deputy of the PDS called the measure "absurd." The PDS is a part of the Manko Wattu Sénégal coalition. For some this is because Sall's political coalition of Benno Bokk Yaakaar holds a dozen out of the 15 diaspora seats. Additionally, the opposition proposed to keep 150 seats of the legislature, but simply add 10 for the diaspora rather than adding 15 seats to create a total of 165 deputies.

=== Extension of the powers of the National Assembly ===
New measures were added to increase the powers of the National Assembly, including in Article 59 which explains the role of the Parliament. The article states that the National Assembly "votes, alone, the laws, controls the action of the Government and evaluates the public policies."

=== Submission to the Constitutional Council of organic laws ===
The organisation has the right to review laws "relating to the organisation and functioning of the public powers voted by the deputies to modify certain provisions of the Constitution." Relating to constitutional law, the following sentence was added to Article 78: "They may not be promulgated if the Constitutional Council, obligatorily referred [to the matter] by the President of the Republic, does not declare them [as] conforming to the Constitution."

=== Increase of Constitutional Council members from 5 to 7 and the nomination of Constitutional Council members by the president of the National Assembly ===
The council had previously been made up of five members appointed by the president of the republic. The change added two members, who would be appointed by the president from a list chosen by the president of the National Assembly. This is seen by some as an increase on the powers of the executive.

=== Extension of the powers of the Constitutional Council ===
This allows the Constitutional Council to have direct advisory powers and to hear matters of unconstitutionality raised by the Court of Appeal. The sentence "The Constitutional Council may be referred [to a matter] by the President of the Republic for [its] opinion" was added to Article 92 of the constitution.

=== Constitutionalisation of the principles of decentralisation and de-concentration ===
An increase of protection on laws regarding decentralisation and de-concentration which sometimes change with turnovers of power.

=== Intangibility of the provisions relating to the republican form, to secularism, with the indivisible, democratic and decentralised character of the state, the mode of election, the duration and the number of mandates consecutive years of the president of the republic. ===
The use of the word "secularism" worried some as Senegal is a state where 94% of residents identify as Muslim. Some see this addition as another way to legalise same-sex marriage or as a possibility for a third presidential term.

== Results ==
Choice	Votes	%
For	1,367,592	62.64
Against	815,655	37.36
Total	2,183,247	100.00
Valid votes	2,183,247	99.10
Invalid/blank votes	19,815	0.90
Total votes	2,203,062	100.00
Registered voters/turnout	5,709,582	38.59
Source: CENA, Direct Democracy

== See also ==
- Right of expatriates to vote in their country of origin
