= 1963 Senegalese general election =

- 1 December 1963
- Presidential election
- Turnout: 86.29%
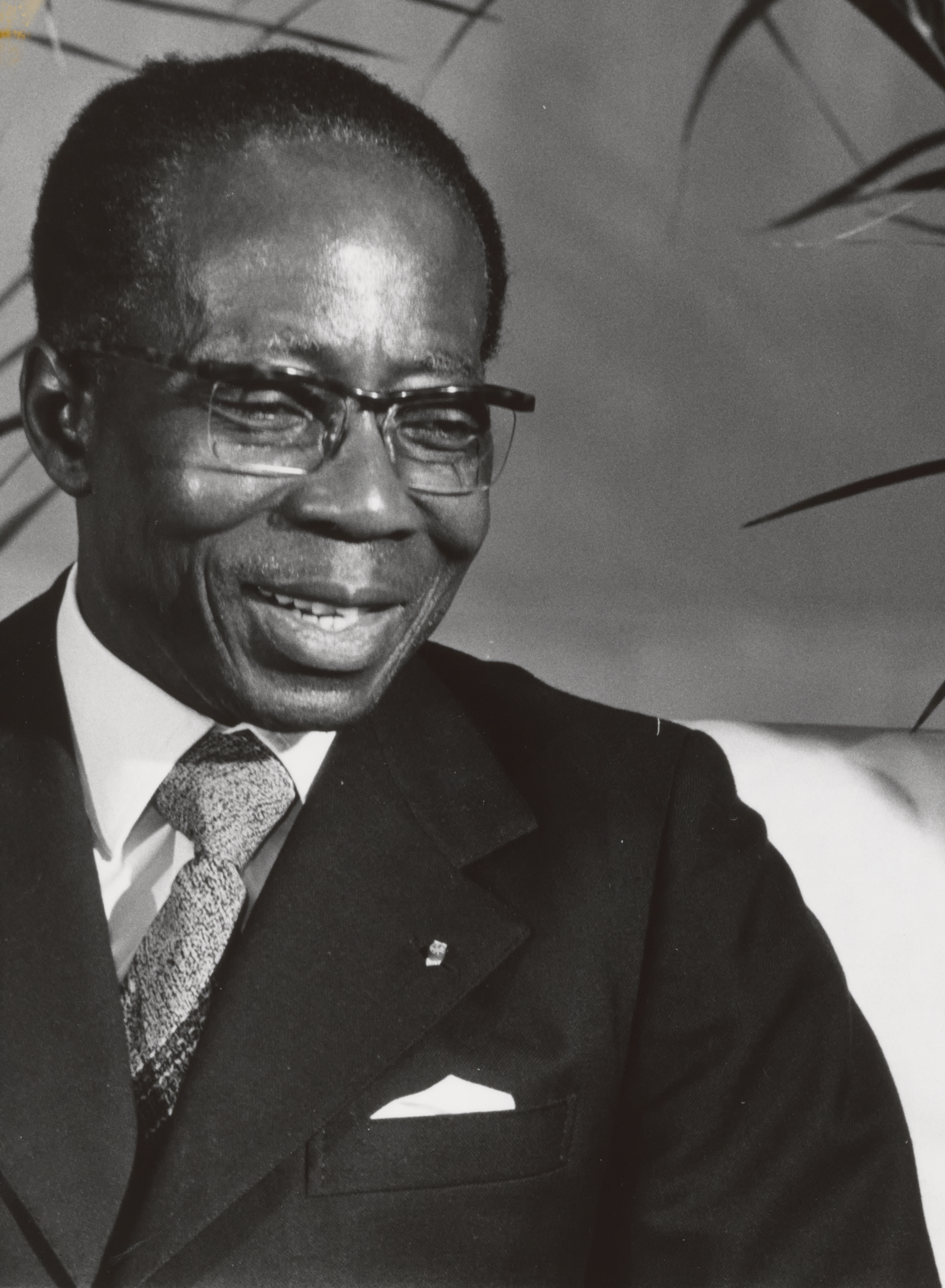
Candidate	Léopold Sédar Senghor
Party	UPS
Popular vote	1,149,935
Percentage	100%
President before election
Léopold Sédar Senghor
UPS
Elected President
Léopold Sédar Senghor
UPS
- Parliamentary election
- Turnout: 89.86%
Party	Leader	Vote %	Seats	+/–
UPS	Léopold Sédar Senghor	94.20	80	0
This lists parties that won seats. See the complete results below.

General elections were held in Senegal on 1 December 1963. It was the first time the president had been directly elected. However, incumbent Léopold Sédar Senghor of the Senegalese Progressive Union (UPS) was the only candidate, and was re-elected unopposed. The UPS also won all 80 seats in the National Assembly with 94% of the vote. Voter turnout was around 86% for the presidential election and 90% for the Assembly election.

== Results ==
=== President ===
Candidate	Party	Votes	%
Léopold Sédar Senghor	Senegalese Progressive Union	1,149,935	100.00
Total		1,149,935	100.00
Valid votes		1,149,935	99.47
Invalid/blank votes		6,124	0.53
Total votes		1,156,059	100.00
Registered voters/turnout		1,339,679	86.29
Source: Sternberger et al.

=== National Assembly ===
Party	Votes	%	Seats	+/–
Senegalese Progressive Union	1,132,518	94.20	80	0
Senegalese Democracy and Unity	69,776	5.80	0	0
Total	1,202,294	100.00	80	0
Valid votes	1,202,294	99.88		
Invalid/blank votes	1,488	0.12		
Total votes	1,203,782	100.00		
Registered voters/turnout	1,339,679	89.86		
Source: Sternberger et al.
