= Combat pour le socialisme =

Combat pour le socialisme (French for 'Struggle for Socialism') is the organ of the Working Committees of the Socialist Party in Senegal. It has been published monthly since 1986.
