= Constitution of Senegal =

The fourth Constitution of Senegal (French: Constitution de la République du Sénégal) was adopted in a 2001 referendum. It was amended by constitutional law № 2016-10 after a 2016 referendum.

== History ==
Senegal has previously had three other constitutions: in 1959, 1960, and in 1963.
