= President of Senegal =

Head of state and government

President of the Republic of Senegal Président de la République du Sénégal
- Coat of Arms of Senegal

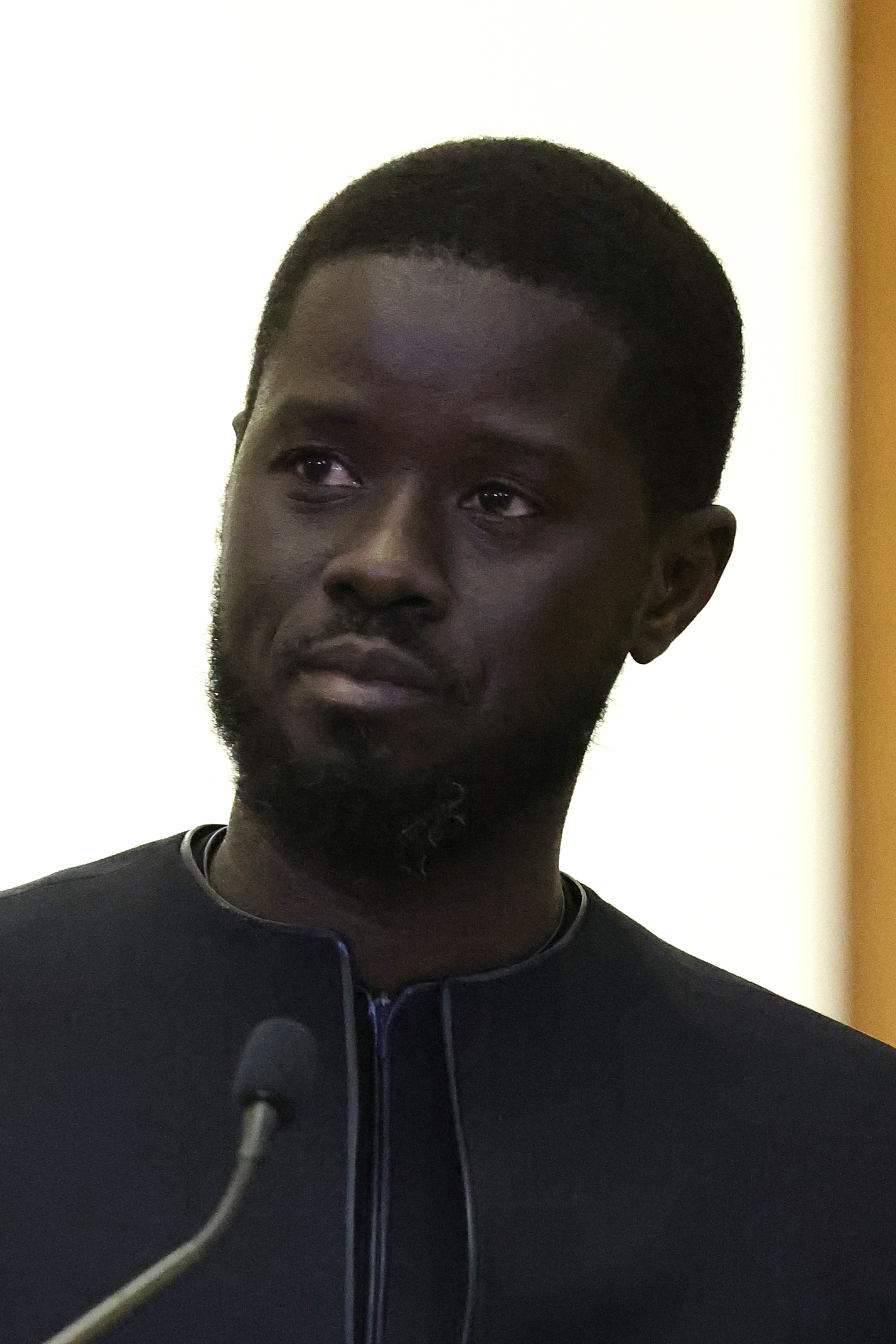
- Incumbent; Bassirou Diomaye Faye since 2 April 2024
- Residence: Palace of the Republic, Dakar
- Term length: Five years, renewable once
- Constituting instrument: Constitution of Senegal (2001)
- Inaugural holder: Léopold Sédar Senghor
- Formation: 6 September 1960; 66 years ago
- Salary: CFA 9,278,556 annually
- Website: presidence.sn

The president of Senegal (French: Président du Sénégal) is the head of state of Senegal. In accordance with the constitutional reform of 2001 and since a referendum that took place on 20 March 2016, the president is elected for a 5-year term, with a limit of two consecutive terms. The following is a list of presidents of Senegal, since the country gained independence from France in 1960.

== Election process ==
=== Inauguration ===
The Senegalese Constitution provides the following oath for the president which must be taken before they enter into office:

"I swear, before God and the people of Senegal, to faithfully execute the office of president of the republic of Senegal, to keep the provisions of the Constitution and laws and to ensure their observance, to devote all my strength to defending constitutional institutions, to defend Senegal's territorial integrity and its independence, and [I swear] to spare no effort to realize the unity of Africa".

== Term ==
=== Term duration ===
In 1991, presidential term lengths were extended from five to seven years.

In January 2001, during Abdoulaye Wade's first term, a constitutional referendum reduced the presidential term back to five years.

In July 2008, during Wade's second term, the National Assembly approved a constitutional amendment increasing the length of the presidential term back to seven years, as it was prior to the adoption of the 2001 constitution. This extension did not apply to Abdoulaye Wade's 2007–2012 term.

In 2016, during Macky Sall's first term, per another constitutional referendum, the length of the presidential term was decreased back to five years. The amendments were adopted in constitutional law № 2016-10.

=== Term limits ===
As of 2021, there is a two-term limit for the president in the Constitution of Senegal. Abdoulaye Wade was controversially allowed to run for president in 2012 following the 2008 constitutional amendment, but lost re-election to Macky Sall.

== Privileges ==
=== Buildings ===
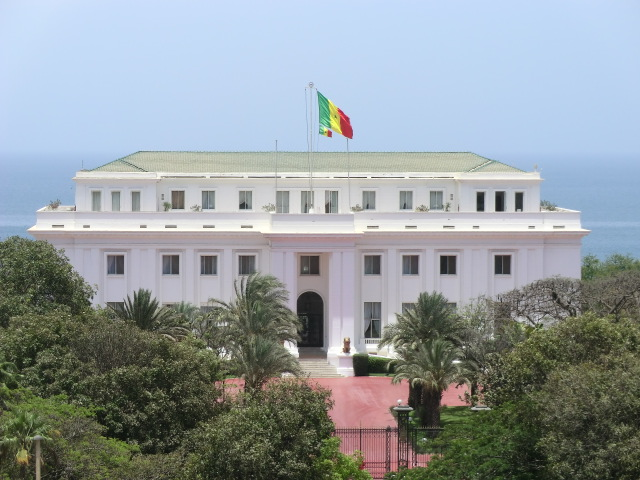
Palace of the Republic

The Palace of the Republic (French: Palais de la République) is the presidential residence, located in Dakar in the Plateau district. After having been the official residence of the Governor-General of French West Africa. The construction of the palace in its first state was ordered in 1902 by Gaston Doumergue, Minister of the Colonies, to house in the capital the Governor General of French West Africa who was then residing in Saint-Louis. The architect was Henri Deglane.

== List of officeholders ==
Political parties

Socialist Party of Senegal (PSS)
Senegalese Democratic Party (PDS)
Alliance for the Republic (APR)
African Patriots of Senegal for Work, Ethics and Fraternity (PASTEF)

Symbols

^{§} Elected unopposed

No.	Portrait	Name (Birth–Death)	Term of office			Political party	Elected	Cabinet(s)	Prime minister(s)	Ref.
No.	Portrait	Name (Birth–Death)	Took office	Left office	Time in office	Political party	Elected	Cabinet(s)	Prime minister(s)	Ref.
1		Léopold Sédar Senghor (1906–2001)	6 September 1960	31 December 1980	20 years, 116 days	PSS	1960^{[§]}	—	Mamadou Dia	
1		Léopold Sédar Senghor (1906–2001)	6 September 1960	31 December 1980	20 years, 116 days	PSS	—	Senghor I	Abdou Diouf	
1		Léopold Sédar Senghor (1906–2001)	6 September 1960	31 December 1980	20 years, 116 days	PSS	1963^{[§]}	Senghor II	Abdou Diouf	
1		Léopold Sédar Senghor (1906–2001)	6 September 1960	31 December 1980	20 years, 116 days	PSS	—	Senghor III	Abdou Diouf	
1		Léopold Sédar Senghor (1906–2001)	6 September 1960	31 December 1980	20 years, 116 days	PSS	—	Senghor IV	Abdou Diouf	
1		Léopold Sédar Senghor (1906–2001)	6 September 1960	31 December 1980	20 years, 116 days	PSS	—	Senghor V	Abdou Diouf	
1		Léopold Sédar Senghor (1906–2001)	6 September 1960	31 December 1980	20 years, 116 days	PSS	1968^{[§]}	Senghor VI	Abdou Diouf	
1		Léopold Sédar Senghor (1906–2001)	6 September 1960	31 December 1980	20 years, 116 days	PSS	—	Senghor VII	Abdou Diouf	
1		Léopold Sédar Senghor (1906–2001)	6 September 1960	31 December 1980	20 years, 116 days	PSS	1973^{[§]}	Senghor VII	Abdou Diouf	
1		Léopold Sédar Senghor (1906–2001)	6 September 1960	31 December 1980	20 years, 116 days	PSS	1978	Senghor VII	Abdou Diouf	
2		Abdou Diouf (born 1935)	1 January 1981	1 April 2000	19 years, 91 days	PSS	—	Diouf XI	Habib Thiam; Moustapha Niasse; Habib Thiam; Mamadou Lamine Loum	
2		Abdou Diouf (born 1935)	1 January 1981	1 April 2000	19 years, 91 days	PSS	1983	Diouf XI	Habib Thiam; Moustapha Niasse; Habib Thiam; Mamadou Lamine Loum	
2		Abdou Diouf (born 1935)	1 January 1981	1 April 2000	19 years, 91 days	PSS	1988	Diouf XI	Habib Thiam; Moustapha Niasse; Habib Thiam; Mamadou Lamine Loum	
2		Abdou Diouf (born 1935)	1 January 1981	1 April 2000	19 years, 91 days	PSS	1993	Diouf XI	Habib Thiam; Moustapha Niasse; Habib Thiam; Mamadou Lamine Loum	
3		Abdoulaye Wade (born 1926)	1 April 2000	2 April 2012	12 years, 1 day	PDS	2000	—	Moustapha Niasse; Mame Madior Boye; Idrissa Seck; Macky Sall; Cheikh Hadjibou Soumaré; Souleymane Ndéné Ndiaye	
3		Abdoulaye Wade (born 1926)	1 April 2000	2 April 2012	12 years, 1 day	PDS	2007	—	Moustapha Niasse; Mame Madior Boye; Idrissa Seck; Macky Sall; Cheikh Hadjibou Soumaré; Souleymane Ndéné Ndiaye	
4		Macky Sall (born 1961)	2 April 2012	2 April 2024	12 years	APR	2012	Sall III	Abdoul Mbaye; Aminata Touré; Mohamed Dionne; Amadou Ba; Sidiki Kaba	
4		Macky Sall (born 1961)	2 April 2012	2 April 2024	12 years	APR	2019	Sall III	Abdoul Mbaye; Aminata Touré; Mohamed Dionne; Amadou Ba; Sidiki Kaba	
4		Macky Sall (born 1961)	2 April 2012	2 April 2024	12 years	APR	—	Sall IV	Abdoul Mbaye; Aminata Touré; Mohamed Dionne; Amadou Ba; Sidiki Kaba	
5		Bassirou Diomaye Faye (born 1980)	2 April 2024	Incumbent	2 years, 166 days	PASTEF	2024	—	Sidiki Kaba; Ousmane Sonko; Ahmadou Al Aminou Lo	

== See also ==
- Politics of Senegal
- Prime Minister of Senegal
- First Lady of Senegal
- List of colonial governors of Senegal
