= Senegalese Solidarity Party =

Political party in Senegal

Senegalese Solidarity Party (in French: Parti de la Solidarité Sénégalaise) was a political party in Senegal. PSS was created in January 1959. It was led by Ibrahima Seydou Ndaw, Cheikh Tidiane Sy and Oumar Diop.

PSS was dissolved after the elections same year, in which it failed to make any impact.

== Sources ==
1. Zuccarelli, François. La vie politique sénégalaise (1940-1988). Paris: CHEAM, 1988.
