= 1983 Senegalese general election =

- 27 February 1983
- Presidential election
- Turnout: 56.70%
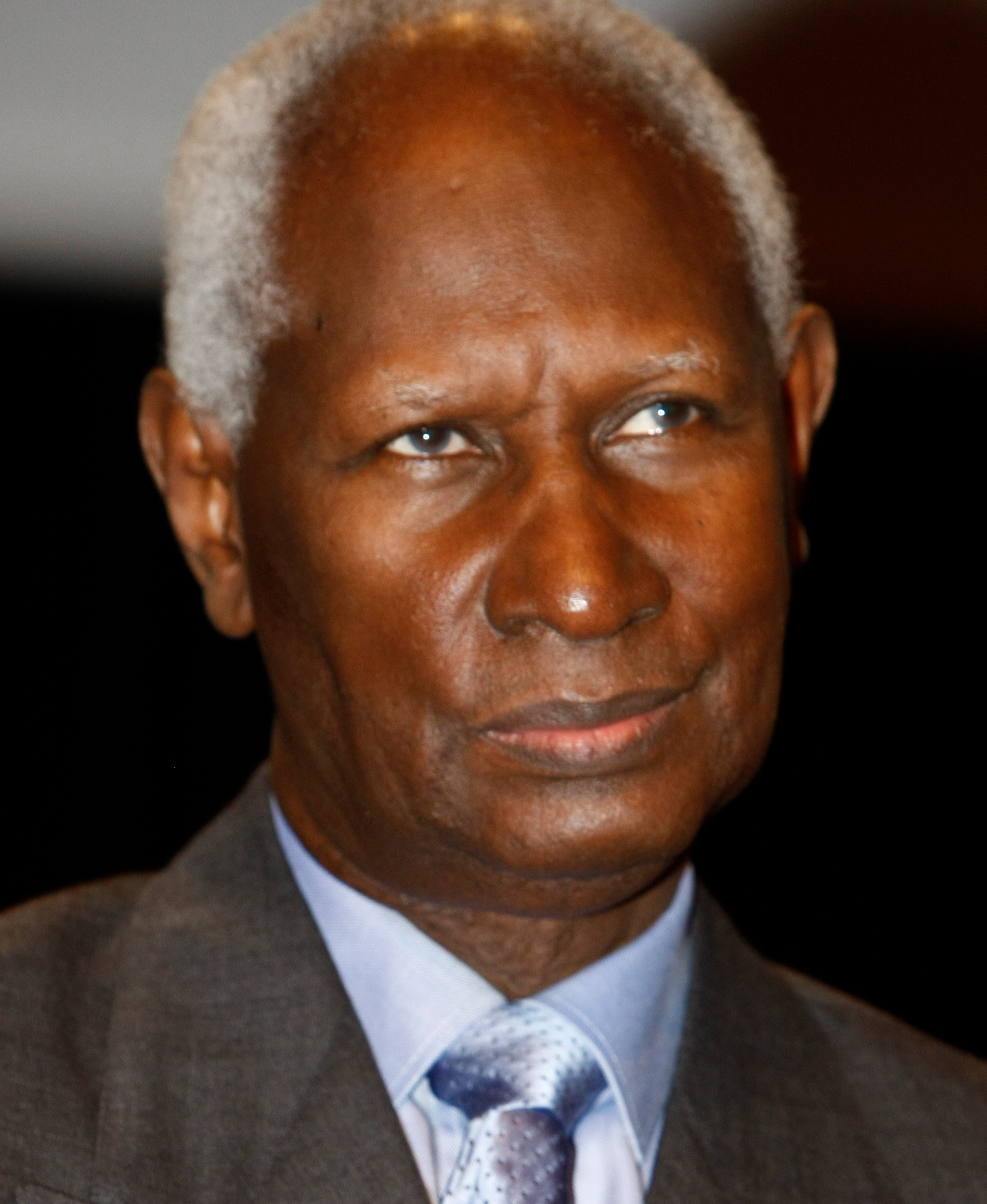

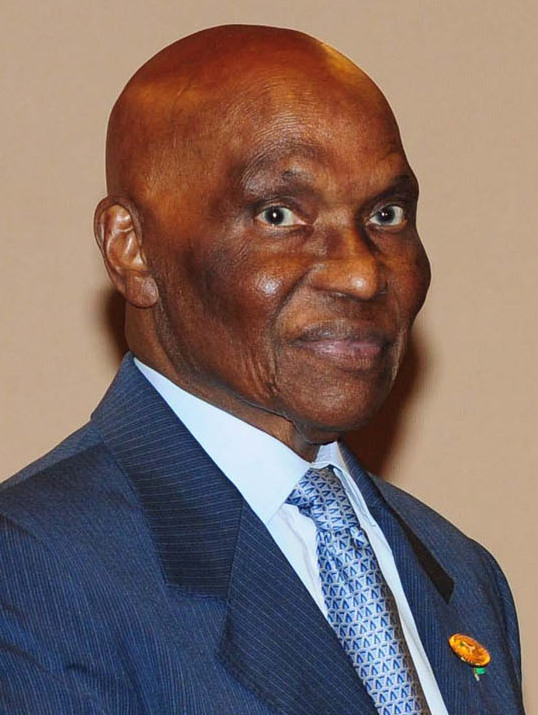
Candidate	Abdou Diouf	Abdoulaye Wade
Party	PS	PDS
Popular vote	908,879	161,067
Percentage	83.45%	14.79%
President before election
Abdou Diouf
PS
Elected President
Abdou Diouf
PS
- Parliamentary election
- Turnout: 56.20%
Party	Leader	Vote %	Seats	+/–
PS	Abdou Diouf	79.94	111	+29
PDS	Abdoulaye Wade	13.97	8	−10
RND	Cheikh Anta Diop	2.71	1	New
This lists parties that won seats. See the complete results below.

General elections were held in Senegal on 27 February 1983 to elect a President and National Assembly. Incumbent Abdou Diouf, who had taken office in January 1981 following the resignation of Léopold Sédar Senghor, defeated four other candidates in the presidential election. Members of the National Assembly were elected using a mixed-member majoritarian system, with sixty members being chosen by the single-member plurality system and sixty being chosen by closed-list proportional representation. In the National Assembly election Diouf's Socialist Party won 111 of the 120 seats. Voter turnout was 56% in the Assembly election and 57% in the presidential election.

== Results ==
=== President ===
Candidate	Party	Votes	%
Abdou Diouf	Socialist Party	908,879	83.45
Abdoulaye Wade	Senegalese Democratic Party	161,067	14.79
Mamadou Dia	People's Democratic Movement	15,150	1.39
Oumar Wone	Senegalese People's Party	2,146	0.20
Majhemout Diop	African Independence Party	1,833	0.17
Total		1,089,075	100.00
Valid votes		1,089,075	99.62
Invalid/blank votes		4,169	0.38
Total votes		1,093,244	100.00
Registered voters/turnout		1,928,257	56.70
Source: African Elections Database

=== National Assembly ===
Party	Votes	%	Seats	+/–
Socialist Party	862,713	79.94	111	+29
Senegalese Democratic Party	150,785	13.97	8	–10
National Democratic Rally	29,271	2.71	1	New
People's Democratic Movement	13,030	1.21	0	New
Democratic League/Movement for the Labour Party	12,053	1.12	0	New
Party of Independence and Labour	5,910	0.55	0	New
African Independence Party	3,269	0.30	0	0
Senegalese People's Party	2,139	0.20	0	New
Total	1,079,170	100.00	120	+20
Valid votes	1,079,170	99.58		
Invalid/blank votes	4,511	0.42		
Total votes	1,083,681	100.00		
Registered voters/turnout	1,928,257	56.20		
Source: African Elections Database
