= Ousmane Tanor Dieng =

Senegalese politician (1947–2019)

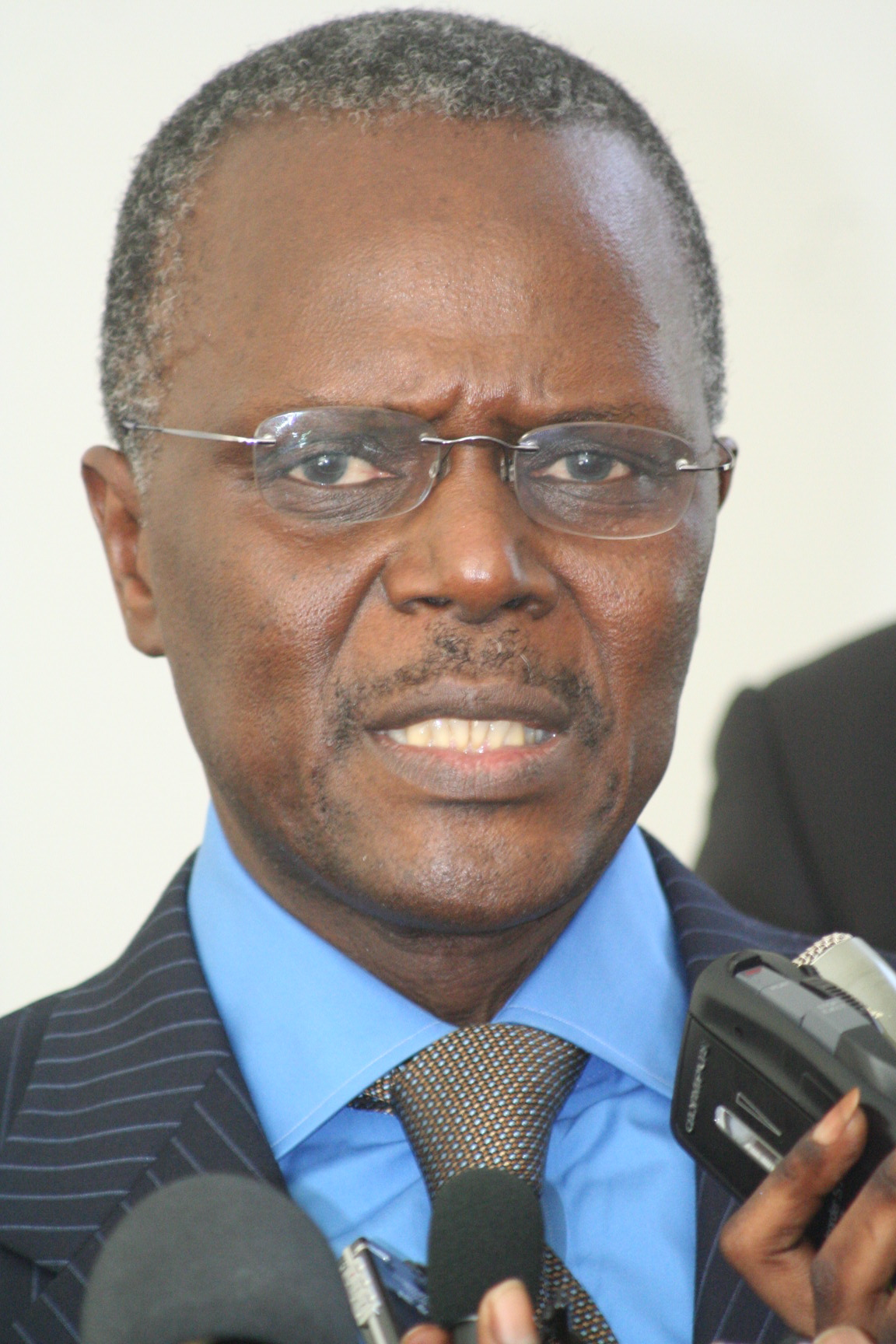

First Secretary of the Socialist Party of Senegal
- In office 1996 – 15 July 2019

Vice-president of the Socialist International
- In office 1996 – 15 July 2019

Personal details
- Born: 2 January 1947 Nguéniène
- Died: 15 July 2019 (aged 72) Paris, France
- Party: Socialist Party of Senegal

Ousmane Tanor Dieng (January 2, 1947 – July 15, 2019) was the First Secretary of the Socialist Party of Senegal. He was vice-president of the Socialist International from 1996 until his death.

== Personal life ==
Born in 1947 in Nguéniène, Senegal, Dieng attended the Koranic school between the ages of 3–7. He hailed from the "Sérére" ethnic group which constitutes about 15 per cent of the Senegalese population.

He began his primary education in 1955, in Nguéniène. In 1961, he attended the Andre Peytavin secondary school, St. Louis and later continued at the Maurice DELAFOSSE secondary school in Dakar, where he finished his secondary education. He studied law at the Cheikh Anta Diop University of Dakar where he majored in international relations. He obtained a bachelor's degree in public law as well as a master's degree in political sciences and constitutional law. He had a direct entry into the Ecole Nationale d’Administration et de Magistrature (ENAM) at a period the school was not very competitive because of very few prospectives. He chose diplomacy and spent 2 years to qualify for ENAM.

== Administrative career ==
=== Foreign Office ===
In 1976, he finished his studies at the ENAM and was thereafter posted to the foreign office where he performed various functions being in charge of the International Affairs (Africa Division and UNO) until 1978.

=== Presidency ===
In October 1978, he was appointed as the diplomatic advisor of Leopold Sedar Senghor (President of the Republic at that time) who was in search of somebody with an international background who can write. For Ousmane Tanor Dieng, it was a privilege to work with Senghor who was one of his idols. He handled the scientific and literary domain. In January 1981, Abdou Diouf (the former president of Senegal) became president according to article 35 of the Senegalese constitution; Ousmane Tanor Dieng continued in the presidency as the Diplomatic Advisor of Abdou Diouf till 1988. In 1988, still in the presidency, he became director of departmental staff until 1993. And in 1993 he was appointed minister in charge of presidential services and affairs until 2000.

== Political career ==
=== General Secretary of Coordination ===
Parallel to this administrative career, he had a political career. Since 1988, he developed interest in politics as a result of being the president's speech writer; thus, he began to invest so much in his village. He then became the secretary general of coordination in the authorities of the party.

=== First Secretary of the Socialist Party of Senegal ===
Consequently, he was eventually chosen by President Abdou Diouf as the First Secretary of the Socialist Party of Senegal. He became responsible for the day-to-day management of the party. He took advantage of his position in the Party, and came tops in the list of candidate for the general elections and was consequently elected representative. However, he subsequently had to resign because the function of Minister was conflicting with the function of representative.

=== The Socialist International and African integration ===
A vice-president of the Socialist International, Dieng thought that without integration, Africa had no future. He believed Africa had to become integrated, or else it will perish. Although integration is difficult, Dieng seemed optimistic, and was encouraged by the theory of "the concentrated circles", an idea of Leopold Sedar Senghor. In a sense, he felt that Africans had no choice on the question of integration. The Socialist International encourages international participation in conflict resolution in Africa, as well as promoting and strengthening democracy in the continent. It also favors African integration.

== 2007 presidential election ==
Dieng ran for President of Senegal in the February 2007 election. His platform included:

- Promoting good governance.
- Fighting against corruption, embezzlement and bribery.
- Recenting the power of institutions.
- Returning to a parliamentary regime where the seat of the powers will be the National Assembly.
- Working for the independence of the judiciary.
- Promoting and protecting agriculture, which employs 65% of the Senegalese population.

In a sense he campaigned for changes to the economic, political, institutional, cultural and social structure, with the goal of reducing the rate of unemployment in Senegal.

Dieng came in third place in the election with 13.56% of the vote, behind the winner, president Abdoulaye Wade, and Idrissa Seck. Claiming irregularities, Dieng filed an appeal regarding the election with the Constitutional Council, but it was rejected. Shortly after the election, Wade mentioned Dieng as one of several opposition leaders who would be facing prosecution for alleged corruption. Dieng was accused of illegally selling fishing licenses in 1992.
