= Senegalese Democratic Party – Renewal =

Political party in Senegal

Senegalese Democratic Party-Renewal (in French: Parti Démocratique Sénégalais-Rénovation) is a political party in Senegal, founded in 1987 by Serigne Lamine Diop, as a split from the Senegalese Democratic Party (PDS) following Diop's expulsion from the party.

== Sources ==
Zuccarelli, François. La vie politique sénégalaise (1940-1988). Paris: CHEAM, 1988.
