= Abdou Diouf =

President of Senegal from 1981 to 2000

- Abdu Juuf
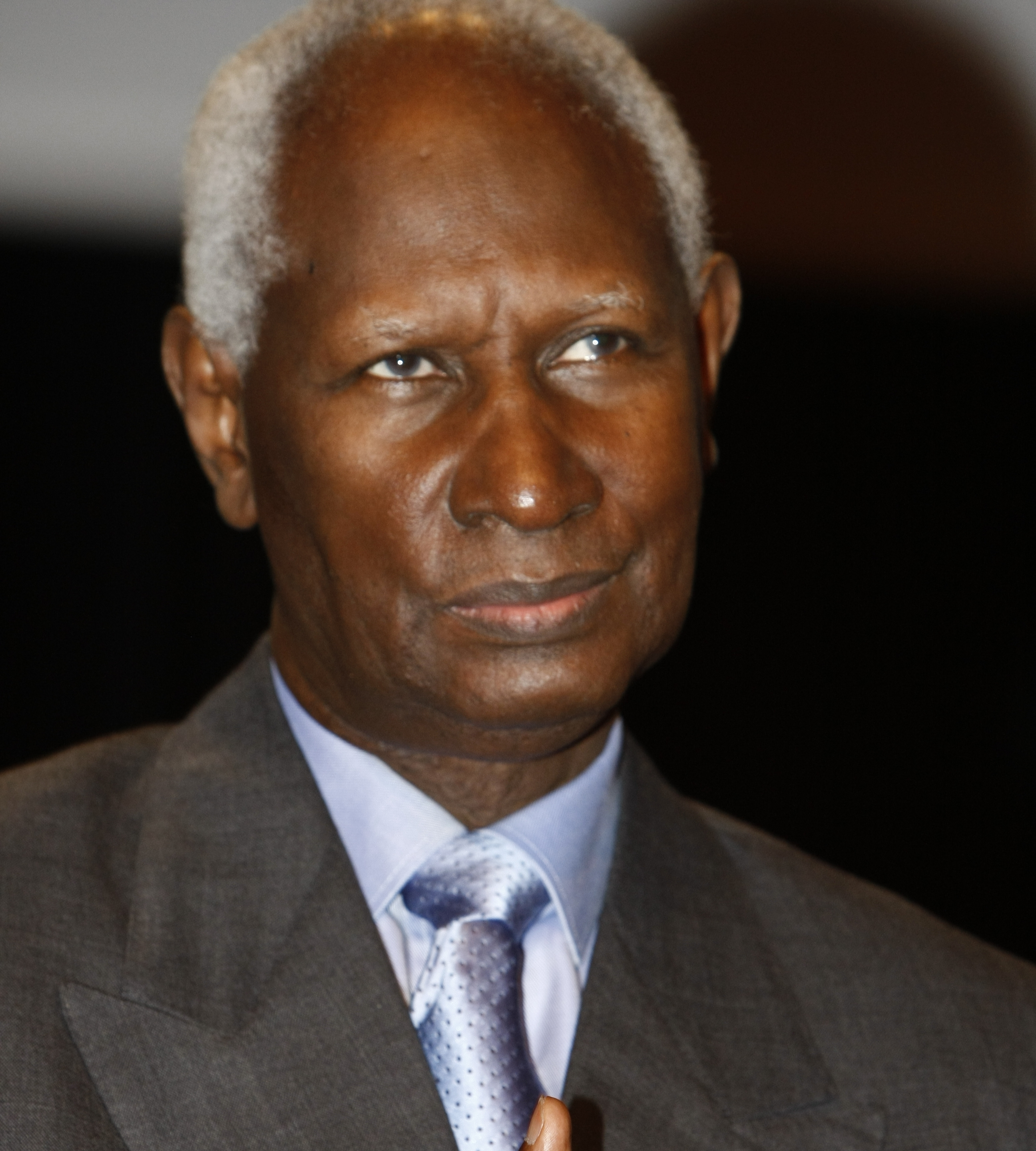
- Diouf in 2008

2nd Secretary-General of the Organisation internationale de la Francophonie
- In office 1 January 2003 – 31 December 2014
- Preceded by: Boutros Boutros-Ghali
- Succeeded by: Michaëlle Jean

2nd President of Senegal
- In office 1 January 1981 – 1 April 2000
- Prime Minister: Habib Thiam; Moustapha Niasse; Habib Thiam; Mamadou Lamine Loum
- Preceded by: Léopold Sédar Senghor
- Succeeded by: Abdoulaye Wade

President of Senegambia
- In office 12 December 1981 – 30 September 1989
- Vice President: Dawda Jawara
- Preceded by: Office established
- Succeeded by: Office abolished

2nd Prime Minister of Senegal
- In office 26 February 1970 – 31 December 1980
- President: Léopold Sédar Senghor
- Preceded by: Mamadou Dia (1962)
- Succeeded by: Habib Thiam

Personal details
- Born: 7 September 1935 (age 91) Louga, French West Africa (now Senegal)
- Party: Socialist Party
- Spouse: Elizabeth Diouf
- Education: University of Dakar; Pantheon-Sorbonne University

Abdou Diouf (US: /ˈɑːbduː diˈuːf/ AHB-doo dee-OOF; Serer: Abdu Juuf; born 7 September 1935) is a Senegalese politician who was the second president of Senegal from 1981 to 2000.

Diouf is notable both for coming to power by peaceful succession and leaving willingly after losing the 2000 presidential election to long-time opposition-leader Abdoulaye Wade. He was also the second Secretary-General of the Organisation internationale de la Francophonie from January 2003 to December 2014.

== Early life ==
Diouf was born into the Joof family in Louga, Senegal, the child of an Helpulaar mother and a Serer father. He attended primary and secondary school at the Lycée Faidherbe in Saint-Louis. He studied law at Dakar University and then at the Sorbonne in Paris. Diouf graduated in 1959.

== Political career ==
After graduation, Diouf returned to Senegal, where, in September 1960, he was appointed Director of International Technical Cooperation. In November 1960, he became assistant to the Secretary-General of the Government; in June 1961, he became Secretary-General of the Ministry of Defense. In 1961 he joined the Senegalese Progressive Union (Union Progressiste Sénégalaise, UPS), which later became the Socialist Party of Senegal. In December 1961 he became Governor of the Sine-Saloum Region, serving in that position until December 1962, when he became Director of the Cabinet of the Ministry of Foreign Affairs. In May 1963, he became Director of the Cabinet of President Léopold Senghor, where he remained until December 1965. In January 1964, he became Secretary-General of the Presidency until March 1968, when he became Minister of Planning and Industry. He remained in the latter position until February 1970, when he was named Prime Minister.

== Presidency ==
In 1970, Senghor reinstated the post of prime minister, giving it to Diouf, his protégé. Senghor trusted Diouf, who had administrative experience but no independent power base. This was important, for Senghor's last prime minister, Mamadou Dia, was accused of using the position to launch a coup d'état. On 1 January 1981, Senghor resigned in favor of Diouf, who became president of Senegal.

=== 1983 and 1988 elections ===
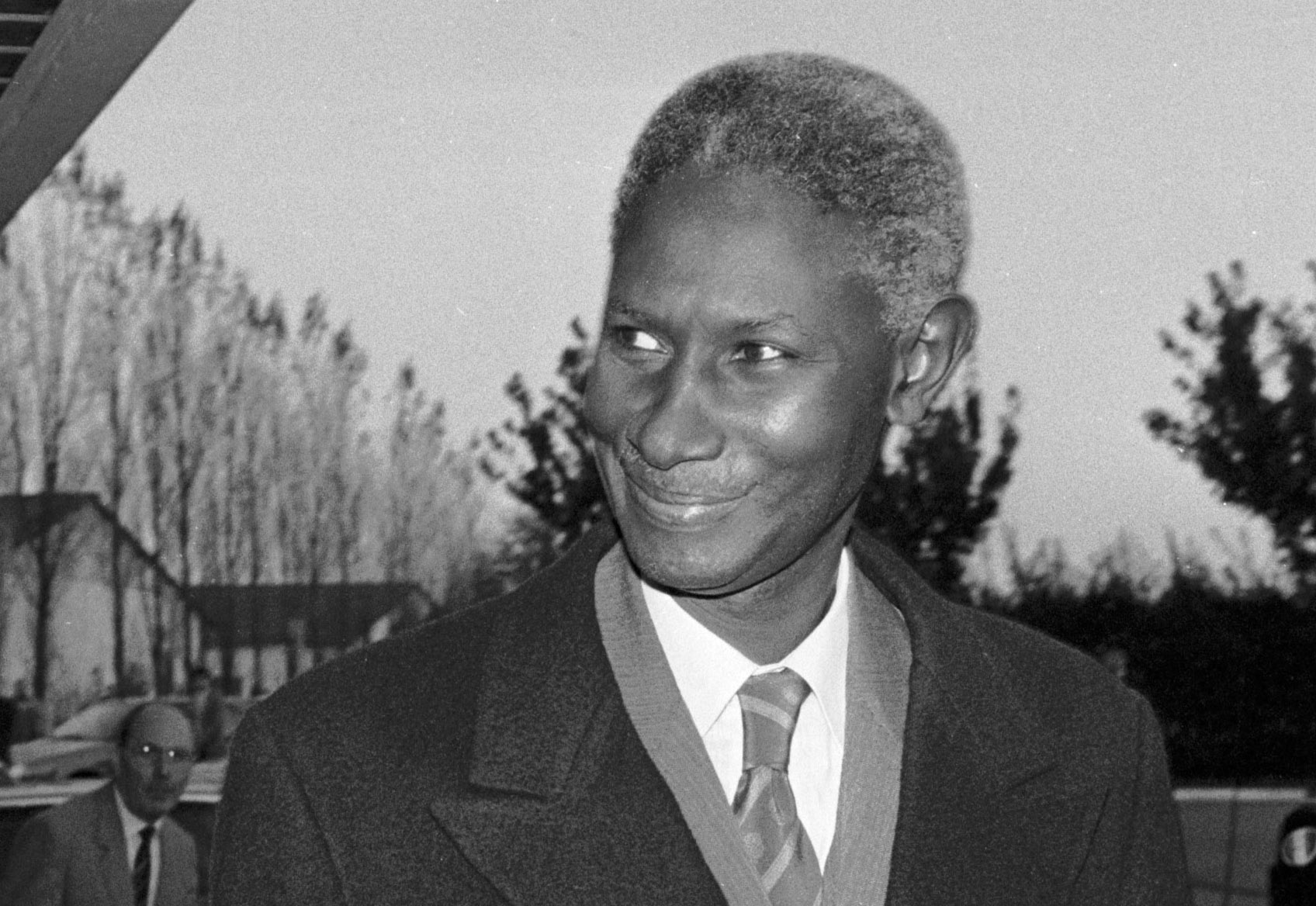
Diouf in 1988

Diouf continued the political liberalization Senghor had begun by holding elections in 1983. He allowed fourteen opposition parties to run instead of the four Senghor had allowed. The practical effect was to fragment the opposition, and Diouf won with 83.5 percent of the vote.

In 1985, opposing parties tried to form a coalition. It was broken up because the national constitution forbade coalitions. Also in 1985, Abdoulaye Wade, Diouf's main political opponent, was temporarily arrested for unlawful demonstration.

In February 1988, elections were held again. Diouf won 72.3 percent of the vote to Wade's 25.8 percent, and opposing parties alleged electoral fraud. Disturbances followed, and Diouf declared a state of emergency, detaining Wade again until May of that year.

=== Senegambia ===
Under Diouf, Senegal agreed to form a confederation called Senegambia with neighboring Gambia on 12 December 1981; this union took place on 1 February 1982. In April 1989, the Mauritania-Senegal Border War developed, leading to an outbreak of ethnic violence and the severing of diplomatic relations with Mauritania. As the region destabilized, Senegambia was dissolved.

=== Response to AIDS ===
In 1986, Diouf began an anti-AIDS program in Senegal before the virus was able to take off in earnest. He used the media and schools to promote safe-sex messages and required prostitutes to be registered. He also encouraged civic organizations and both Christian and Muslim religious leaders to raise awareness about AIDS. The result was that while AIDS was decimating much of Africa, the infection rate for Senegal stayed below 2 percent.

=== 1993 and 2000 elections ===
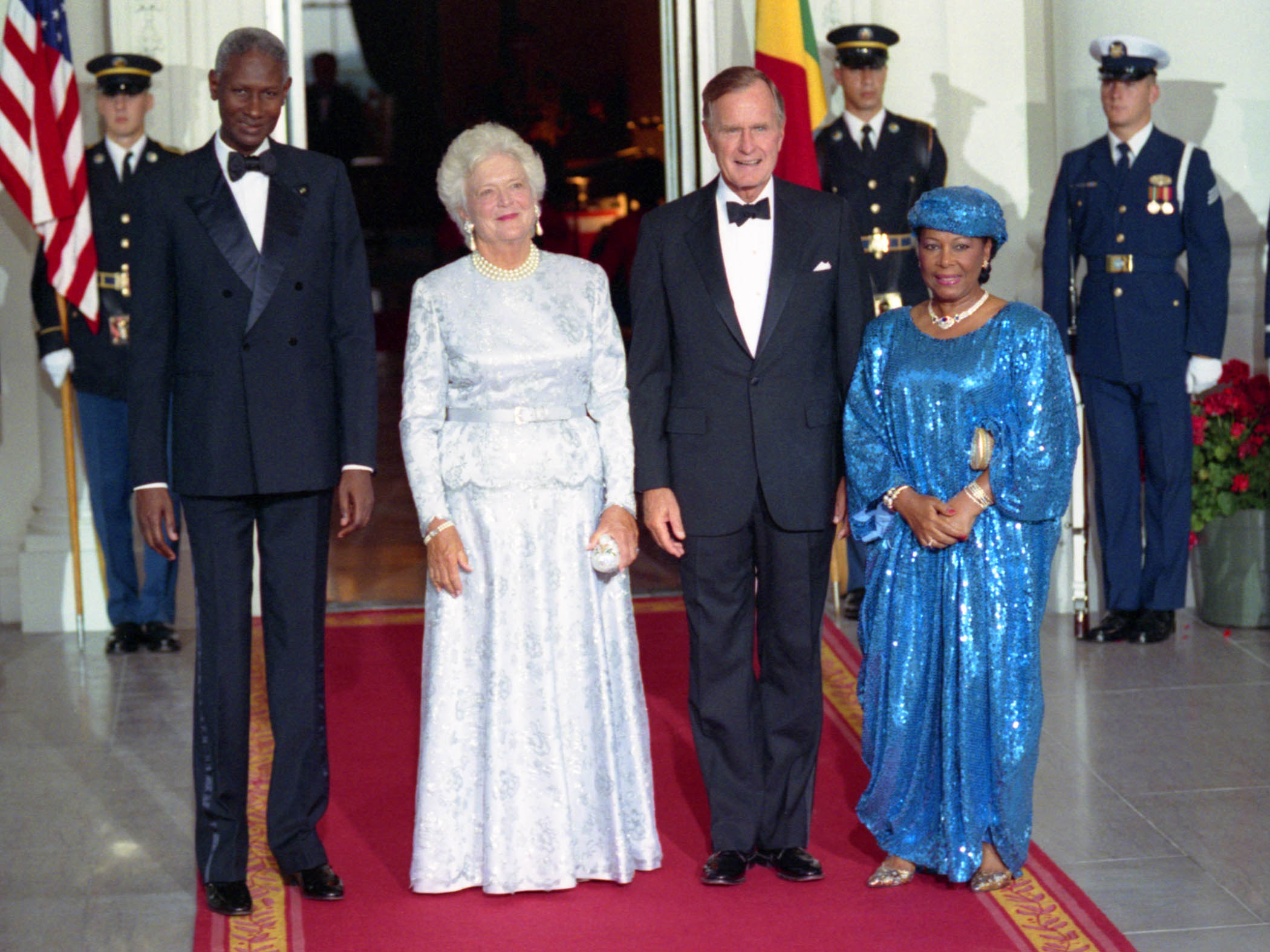
George and Barbara Bush host Abdou and Elizabeth Diouf at the White House, 1991

Diouf was reelected in February 1993 with 58% of the vote to a 7-year term; presidential term lengths had been extended by two years in 1991. In the first round of the 2000 elections, on 27 February, he took 41.3% of the vote against 30.1% for the long-time opposition leader Abdoulaye Wade. Still, in the second round on 19 March, he received only 41.5% against 58.5% for Wade. Diouf conceded defeat and left office on 1 April.

One of Diouf's greatest contributions to African peace came from this electoral defeat, for he gracefully surrendered power to Abdoulaye Wade, his long-time rival. When Diouf left office, Wade even said he should receive a Nobel Peace Prize for leaving without violence.

== Socialist Party leadership ==
Diouf was Deputy Secretary-General of the Socialist Party under Senghor. He became Secretary-General in 1981, and when the party was restructured at its Thirteenth Congress in 1996, he was moved to the position of President of the PS, while Ousmane Tanor Dieng became First Secretary, having been proposed by Diouf.

== International organizations ==
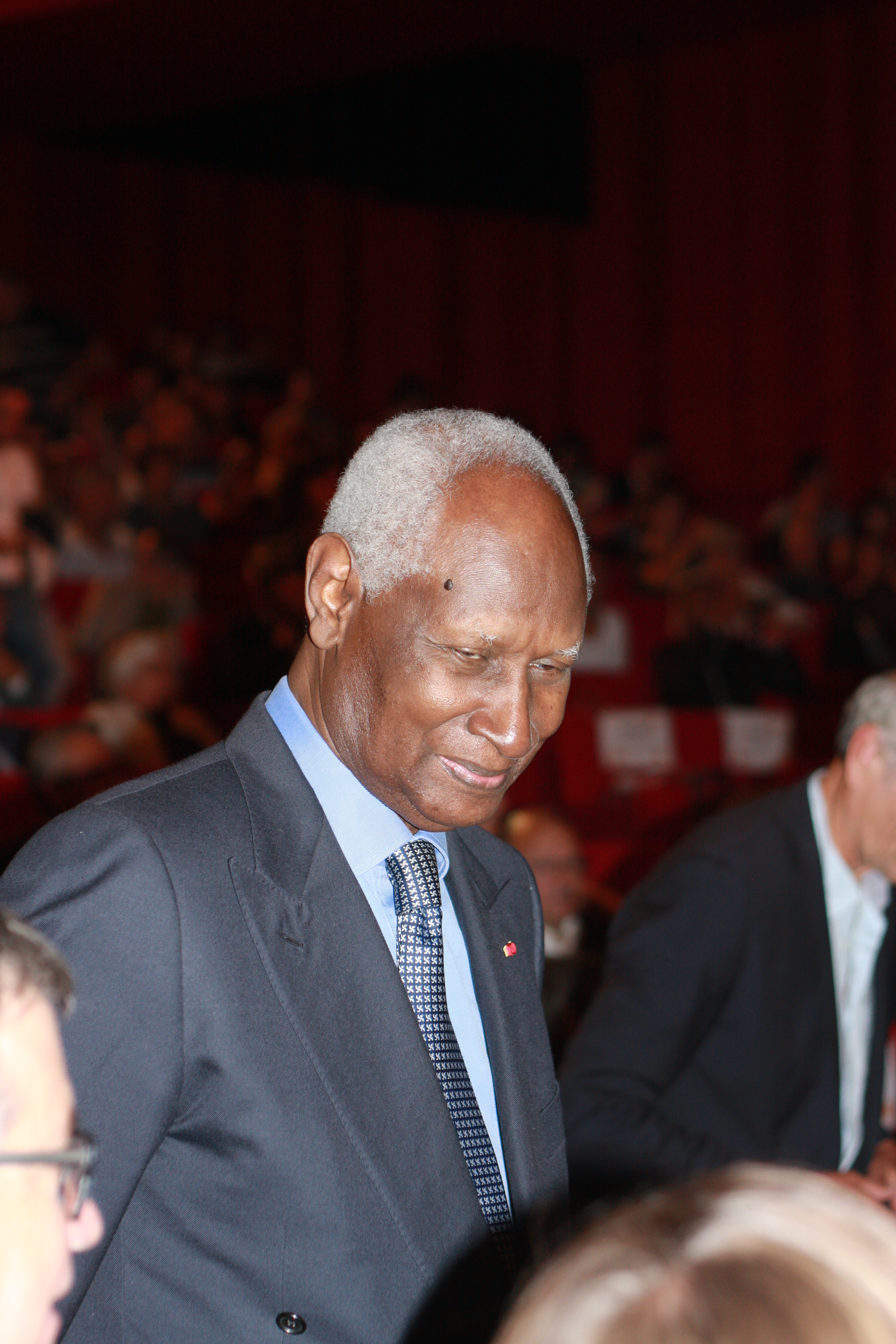
Diouf in 2015

Diouf has been active in international organizations both during and after his presidency. He was President of the Organization of African Unity (OAU) from 1985 to 1986. Soon after his election, he made a personal plea to François Mitterrand, the President of France, resulting in France speaking strongly for sanctions against South Africa. In 1992, he was again reelected President of the OAU for another year-long term. He was also instrumental in establishing the Goree Institute.

After leaving office as President of Senegal, Diouf was unanimously elected as Secretary-General of La Francophonie at that organization's Ninth Summit on 20 October 2002 in Beirut, following the withdrawal of the only other candidate, Henri Lopes of the Republic of the Congo. Diouf took office as Secretary-General on 1 January 2003. He was reelected as Secretary-General for another four years at the organization's summit in Bucharest in September 2006.

Diouf is an Eminent Member of the Sergio Vieira de Mello Foundation.

Diouf is also a member of the Fondation Chirac's honour committee, ever since the foundation was launched in 2008 by former French president Jacques Chirac in order to promote world peace and on the International Multilateral Partnership Against Cyber Threats (IMPACT) International Advisory Board. Additionally, he is one of the 25 leading figures on the Information and Democracy Commission launched by Reporters Without Borders.

== Honours and decorations ==
| Ribbon bar | Country | Honour |
|---|---|---|
| | Senegal | Grand Cross of the National Order of the Lion |
| | Senegal | Grand Cross of the National Order of Merit |
| | France | Grand Cross of the Legion of Honour |
| | Canada | Grand officier of the National Order of Quebec |
| | DR Congo | Grand Cordon of the Order of the National Heroes Kabila-Lumumba |
| | DR Congo | Grand Cordon of the National Order of the Leopard |
| | Organisation internationale de la Francophonie | Grand Cross of the Order of La Pléiade |
| | United Kingdom | Honorary Knight Commander of the Order of the British Empire |
| | South Africa | Grand Cross of the Order of Good Hope |
| | Austria | Grand Star of the Decoration of Honour for Services to the Republic of Austria |
| | Portugal | Grand Cross of the Military Order of Saint James of the Sword |
| | Libya | Grand Cordon of the Order of the Grand Conqueror |

Political offices
| Vacant Title last held by Mamadou Dia | Prime Minister of Senegal; 1970–1980 | Succeeded by Habib Thiam |
| Preceded by Léopold Sédar Senghor | President of Senegal; 1981–2000 | Succeeded by Abdoulaye Wade |
Diplomatic posts
| Preceded by Julius Nyerere | Chairperson of the Organisation of African Unity; 1985–1986 | Succeeded by Denis Sassou-Nguesso |
| Preceded by Ibrahim Babangida | Chairperson of the Organisation of African Unity; 1992–1993 | Succeeded by Hosni Mubarak |
| Preceded by Dawda Jawara | Chairperson of the Economic Community of West African States; 1992–1993 | Succeeded by Nicéphore Soglo |
| Preceded by Boutros Boutros-Ghali | Secretary General of the La Francophonie; 2003–2014 | Succeeded by Michaëlle Jean |
