= Léopold Sédar Senghor =

First president of Senegal, poet, and cultural theorist (1906–2001)

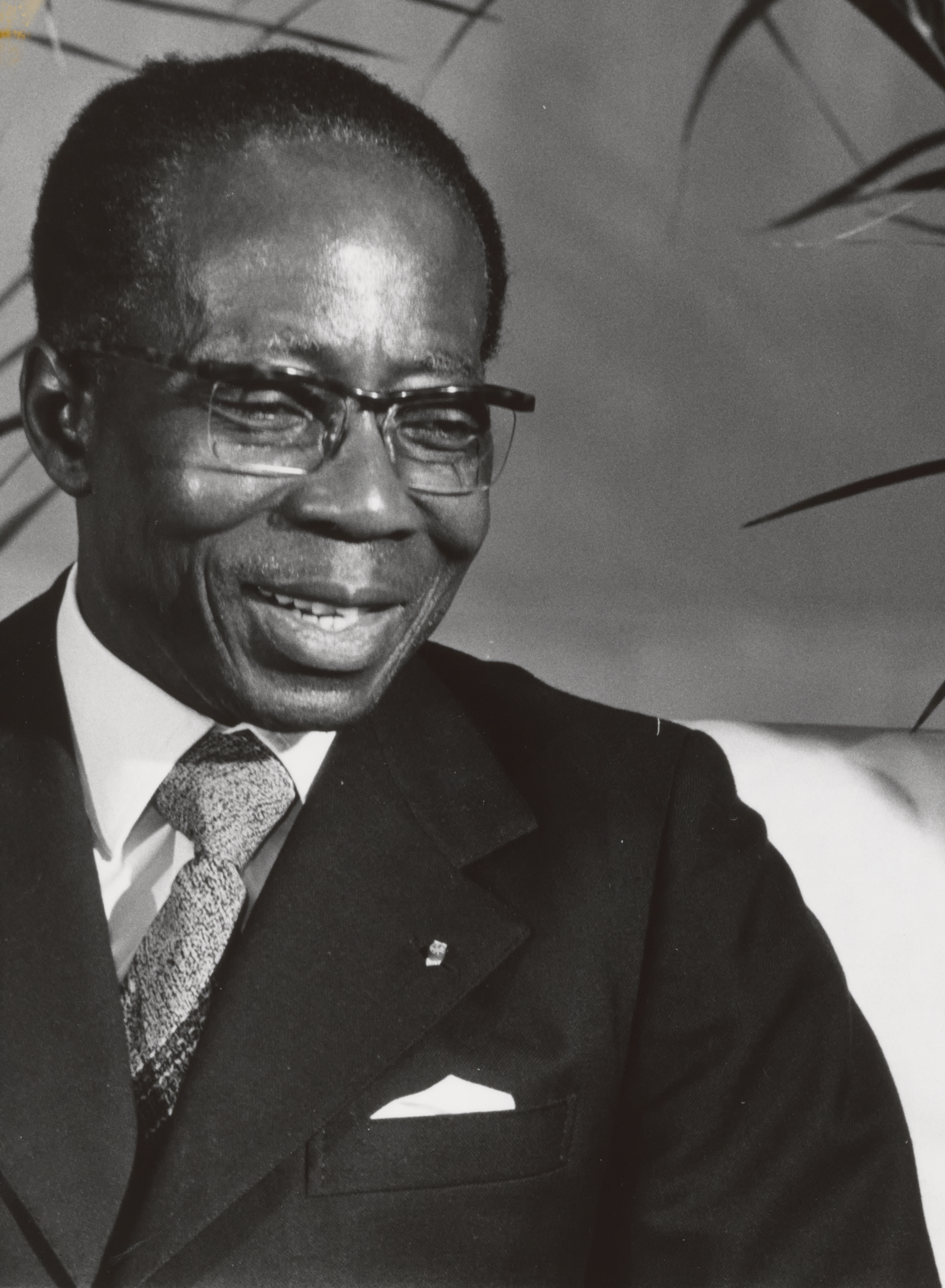
- Senghor in 1978

1st President of Senegal
- In office 6 September 1960 – 31 December 1980
- Prime Minister: Mamadou Dia; Abdou Diouf
- Preceded by: Office established
- Succeeded by: Abdou Diouf

President of the Federal Assembly of the Mali Federation
- In office 17 January 1960 – 20 August 1960
- Preceded by: Office established
- Succeeded by: Office abolished

Personal details
- Born: 9 October 1906 Joal, French West Africa (present-day Senegal)
- Died: 20 December 2001 (aged 95) Verson, France
- Party: Socialist Party of Senegal
- Spouse(s): Ginette Éboué (m. 1946; div. 1956) Colette Hubert Senghor (m. 1957–2001); his death
- Children: 3
- Education: University of Paris
- Religion: Roman Catholicism
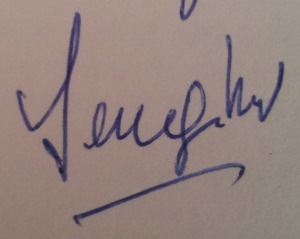
- Signature

Military service
- Allegiance: France
- Branch/service: French Colonial Army
- Years of service: 1939–1942
- Rank: Private 2e Classe
- Unit: 59th Colonial Infantry Division
- Battles/wars: World War II: Battle of France

Léopold Sédar Senghor (/sɒŋˈɡɔːr/ song-GOR, French: [leɔpɔl sedaʁ sɑ̃ɡɔʁ], Wolof: Léwopóol Sedaar Seŋoor; 9 October 1906 – 20 December 2001) was a Senegalese politician, cultural theorist and poet who served as the first president of Senegal from 1960 to 1980.

Ideologically an African socialist, Senghor was one of the major theoreticians of Négritude. He was a proponent of African culture, black identity, and African empowerment within the framework of French-African ties. He advocated for the extension of full civil and political rights for France's African territories while arguing that French Africans would be better off within a federal French structure than as independent nation-states.

Senghor became the first president of independent Senegal. He fell out with his long-standing associate Mamadou Dia, who was the prime minister of Senegal, arresting him on suspicion of fomenting a coup in 1962 and imprisoning him for 12 years. Following this, Senghor established an authoritarian one-party state where rival political parties were suppressed. In 1976, Senghor permitted opposition parties while retaining an unequal playing field favoring his party. Senghor retired in 1980, handing power to Abdou Diouf.

Senghor was the founder of the Senegalese Democratic Bloc party in 1948. He was the first African elected as a member of the Académie française and won the 1985 International Nonino Prize in Italy. Senghor is regarded by many as one of the most important African intellectuals of the 20th century.

== Early years: 1906–28 ==
Léopold Sédar Senghor was born on 9 October 1906 in the city of Joal, some 110 kilometres south of Dakar, the capital of Senegal. His father, Basile Diogoye Senghor (pronounced: Basile Jogoy Senghor), was a wealthy peanut merchant belonging to the bourgeois Serer people. Basile Senghor was said to be a man of great means and owned thousands of cattle and vast lands, some of which were given to him by his cousin the king of Sine. Gnilane Ndiémé Bakhoum (1861–1948), Senghor's mother, the third wife of his father, a Muslim with Fula origin who belonged to the Tabor tribe, was born near Djilor to a Christian family. She gave birth to six children, including two sons.

Senghor's birth certificate states that he was born on 9 October 1906; however, there is a discrepancy with his certificate of baptism, which states it occurred on 9 August 1906. His Serer middle name Sédar comes from the Serer language, meaning "one that shall not be humiliated" or "the one you cannot humiliate".

His surname Senghor is a combination of the Serer words Sène (a Serer surname and the name of the Supreme Deity in Serer religion called Rog Sene) and gor or ghor, the etymology of which is kor in the Serer language, meaning male or man. Tukura Badiar Senghor, the prince of Sine and a figure from whom Léopold Sédar Senghor has been reported to trace descent, was a c. 13th-century Serer noble.

At the age of eight, Senghor began his studies in Senegal in the Ngasobil boarding school of the Fathers of the Holy Spirit. In 1922, he entered a seminary in Dakar. After being told that religious life was not for him, he attended a secular institution. By then, he was already passionate about French literature. He won distinctions in French, Latin, Greek and Algebra. With his Baccalaureate completed, he was awarded a scholarship to continue his studies in France.

== "Sixteen years of wandering": 1928–1944 ==
In 1928, Senghor sailed from Senegal for France, beginning, in his words, "sixteen years of wandering". Starting his post-secondary studies at the Sorbonne, he quit and went on to the Lycée Louis-le-Grand to finish his preparatory course for entrance to the École Normale Supérieure, a grande école. Henri Queffélec, Robert Verdier and Georges Pompidou were also studying at this elite institution. After failing the entrance exam, Senghor prepared for his grammar Agrégation. He was granted his agrégation in 1935 at his second attempt.

=== Academic career ===
Senghor graduated from the University of Paris, where he received the Agrégation in French Grammar. Subsequently, he was designated professor at the universities of Tours and Paris, where he taught during the period 1935–45.

Senghor started his teaching years at the lycée René-Descartes in Tours; he also taught at the lycée Marcelin-Berthelot in Saint-Maur-des-Fosses near Paris. He also studied linguistics taught by Lilias Homburger at the École pratique des hautes études. He studied with prominent social scientists such as Marcel Cohen, Marcel Mauss and Paul Rivet, director of the Institut d'ethnologie de Paris.

Senghor, along with other intellectuals of the African diaspora who had come to study in the colonial capital, coined the term and conceived the notion of "négritude", which was a response to the racism still prevalent in France. It turned the racial slur nègre into a positively connoted celebration of African culture and character. The idea of négritude informed Senghor's cultural criticism and literary work, and became a guiding principle for his political thought in his career as a statesman.

=== Military service ===
In 1939, Senghor was enlisted in the 3rd Colonial Infantry Regiment of the French army with the rank of private (2^{e} Classe) despite his higher education. In June 1940, the invading Germans took him prisoner in la Charité-sur-Loire or Villabon. He was interned in a succession of camps, and finally at Front Stalag 230, in Poitiers. Front Stalag 230 was reserved for colonial troops captured during the war.

According to Senghor, German soldiers wanted to execute him and the others on the day they were captured, but they escaped this fate by yelling Vive la France, vive l'Afrique noire! ("Long live France, long live Black Africa!"). A French officer told the soldiers that executing the African prisoners would dishonour the Aryan race and the German Army. Senghor spent two years in different prison camps, where he spent most of his time writing poems, and learning enough German to read Goethe's poetry in the original. In 1942, he was released for medical reasons.

He resumed his teaching career while remaining involved in the resistance during the Nazi occupation.

== Political career: 1945–1982 ==
=== Colonial France ===
Senghor advocated for African integration within the French Empire, arguing that independence for small, weak territories would lead to the perpetuation of oppression, whereas African empowerment within a federal French Empire could transform it for the better.

Once the war was over, Senghor was selected as Dean of the Linguistics Department with the École nationale de la France d'Outre-Mer, a position he would hold until Senegal's independence in 1960. While travelling on a research trip for his poetry, he met the local socialist leader, Lamine Guèye, who suggested that Senghor run for election as a member of the Assemblée nationale française. Senghor accepted and became député for the riding of Sénégal-Mauritanie, when colonies were granted the right to be represented by elected individuals. They took different positions when the train conductors on the Dakar-Niger line went on strike. Guèye voted against the strike, arguing the movement would paralyse the colony, while Senghor supported the workers, which gained him great support among Senegalese.

During the negotiations to write the French Constitution of 1946, Senghor pushed for the extension of French citizenship to all French territories. Four Senegalese communes had citizenship since 1916 – Senghor argued that this should be extended to the rest of France's territory. Senghor argued for a federal model whereby each African territory would govern its own internal affairs, and this federation would be part of a larger French confederation that run foreign affairs, defence and development policies. Senghor opposed indigenous nationalism, arguing that African territories would develop more successfully within a federal model where each territory had its "negro-African personality" along with French experience and resources.

=== Political changes ===
In 1947, Senghor left the African Division of the French Section of the Workers' International (SFIO), which had given enormous financial support to the social movement. With Mamadou Dia, he founded the Bloc démocratique sénégalais (1948). They won the legislative elections of 1951, and Guèye lost his seat. Senghor was involved in the negotiations and drafting of the Fourth Republic's constitution.

Re-elected deputy in 1951 as an independent overseas member, Senghor was appointed state secretary to the council's president in Edgar Faure's government from 1 March 1955 to 1 February 1956. He became mayor of the city of Thiès, Senegal in November 1956 and then advisory minister in the Michel Debré's government from 23 July 1959 to 19 May 1961. He was also a member of the commission responsible for drafting the Fifth Republic's constitution, general councillor for Senegal, member of the Grand Conseil de l'Afrique Occidentale Francaise and member of the parliamentary assembly of the Council of Europe.

In 1964, Senghor published the first volume of a series of five, titled Liberté. The book contains a variety of speeches, essays and prefaces.

=== Senegal ===
Senghor supported federalism for newly independent African states, a type of "French Commonwealth", while retaining a degree of French involvement:

In Africa, when children have grown up, they leave their parents' hut, and build a hut of their own by its side. Believe me, we don't want to leave the French compound. We have grown up in it, and it is good to be alive in it. We simply want to build our own huts.

— Speech by Senghor, 1957

Since federalism was not favoured by the African countries, he decided to form, along with Modibo Keita, the Mali Federation with former French Sudan (present-day Mali). Senghor was president of the Federal Assembly until it failed in 1960.

Independence Day, 4 April 1962, President Senghor, in glasses to the left, is watching the marchpast.

Afterwards, Senghor became the first President of the Republic of Senegal, elected on 5 September 1960. He is the author of the Senegalese national anthem. The first prime minister, Mamadou Dia, was in charge of executing Senegal's long-term development plan, while Senghor was in charge of foreign relations. The two men quickly disagreed. In December 1962, Mamadou Dia was arrested under suspicion of fomenting a coup d'état. He was held in prison for 12 years. Following this, Senghor took actions to establish an authoritarian presidential regime where all rival political parties were suppressed.

By 1966, Senegal had become a one-party state. Senghor tightly circumscribed press freedom in Senegal where the media market was monopolized by state-run media such as Le Soleil and Radio Sénégal.

On 22 March 1967, Senghor survived an assassination attempt. The suspect, Moustapha Lô, pointed his pistol towards the President after he had participated in the sermon of Tabaski, but the gun did not fire. Lô was sentenced to death for treason and executed on 15 June 1967, even though it remained unclear if he had actually wanted to kill Senghor.

In 1976, Senghor permitted opposition parties to compete, although he limited the number of total parties to three (socialist, communist and liberal), of which Senghor's party would be the designated socialist party. The Senegalese Democratic Party (PDS) was designated as the liberal party, and the African Independence Party was designated as the communist party. The political opposition said that they were constrained and not allowed to compete on equal footing with the regime. The 1978 Senegalese general election was the first multi-party election since 1963.

Following an announcement at the beginning of December 1980, Senghor resigned his position at the end of the year, before the end of his fifth term. He was the first African head of state to retire voluntarily. Abdou Diouf replaced him as the head of the country. One of Diouf's first actions was to remove restrictions on the number of political parties in Senegal. He created a performing education system. Despite the end of official colonialism, the value of Senegalese currency continued to be fixed by France, the language of learning remained French, and Senghor ruled the country with French political advisors.

=== Francophonie ===
He supported the creation of the Organisation internationale de la Francophonie and was elected vice-president of the High Council of the Francophonie. In 1982, he was one of the founders of the Association France and developing countries whose objectives were to bring attention to the problems of developing countries, in the wake of the changes affecting the latter.

== Global policy ==
He was one of the signatories of the agreement to convene a convention for drafting a world constitution. As a result, for the first time in human history, a World Constituent Assembly convened to draft and adopt the Constitution for the Federation of Earth.

== Académie française: 1983–2001 ==
Senghor was elected a member of the Académie française on 2 June 1983, at the 16th seat where he succeeded Antoine de Lévis Mirepoix. He was the first African to sit at the Académie. The entrance ceremony in his honour took place on 29 March 1984, in presence of French President François Mitterrand. This was considered a further step towards greater openness in the Académie, after the previous election of a woman, Marguerite Yourcenar. In 1993, the last and fifth book of the Liberté series was published: Liberté 5: le dialogue des cultures.

== Personal life and death ==
Senghor's first marriage was to Ginette Éboué (1 March 1923 – 1992), daughter of Félix Éboué. They married on 9 September 1946 and divorced in 1955. They had two sons, Francis in 1947 and Guy in 1948. Senghor's second wife, Colette Hubert [fr] (20 November 1925 – 18 November 2019), who was from France, became Senegal's first First Lady upon independence in 1960. Senghor had three sons between his two marriages.

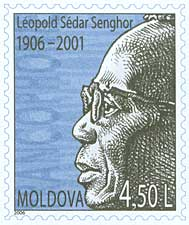
Senghor on a 2006 memorial stamp from Moldova

Senghor spent the last years of his life with his wife in Verson, near the city of Caen in Normandy, where he died on 20 December 2001. His funeral was held on 29 December 2001 in Dakar. Officials attending the ceremony included Raymond Forni, president of the Assemblée nationale and Charles Josselin, state secretary for the minister of foreign affairs, in charge of the Francophonie. Jacques Chirac, who said, upon hearing of Senghor's death: "Poetry has lost one of its masters, Senegal a statesman, Africa a visionary and France a friend", and Lionel Jospin, respectively president of the French Republic and the prime minister, did not attend.

Their failure to attend Senghor's funeral made waves as it was deemed a lack of acknowledgement for what the politician had been in his life. The analogy was made with the Senegalese Tirailleurs who, after having contributed to the liberation of France, had to wait more than forty years to receive an equal pension in terms of buying power to their French counterparts. The scholar Érik Orsenna wrote in the newspaper Le Monde an editorial entitled "J'ai honte" (I am ashamed).

== Legacy ==
Although a socialist, Senghor avoided the Marxist and anti-Western ideology that had become popular in post-colonial Africa, favouring the maintenance of close ties with France and the Western world. Senghor's tenure as president was characterised by the development of African socialism, which was created as an indigenous alternative to Marxism, drawing heavily from the négritude philosophy. In developing this, he was assisted by Ousmane Tanor Dieng.

On 31 December 1980, he retired in favour of his prime minister, Abdou Diouf. Politically, Senghor's stamp can also be identified today. With regards to Senegal in particular, his willful abdication of power to his successor, Abdou Diouf, led to Diouf's peaceful exit from office as well. Senegal's special relationship with France and economic legacy are more highly contested, but Senghor's impact on democracy remains nonetheless.

Senghor managed to retain his identity as a poet and a politician even throughout his busy careers as both, living by his philosophy of achieving equilibrium between competing forces. Whether it was France and Africa, poetics and politics, or other disparate parts of his identity, Senghor balanced the two.

In literature, Senghor's influence on political thought and poetic form are wide-reaching even in the modern day. Senghor's poetry endures as the "record of an individual sensibility at a particular moment in history," capturing the spirit of the Négritude movement at its peak, but also marks a definitive place in literary history. Senghor's thoughts were exceedingly radical for this time, arguing that Africans could only progress if they developed a culture distinct and separate from the colonial powers that oppressed them, pushing against popular thought at the time. Senghor was deeply influenced by poets from the US such as Langston Hughes. Seat number 16 of the Académie was vacant after the Senegalese poet's death. He was ultimately replaced by another former president, Valéry Giscard d'Estaing.

== Honours and awards ==
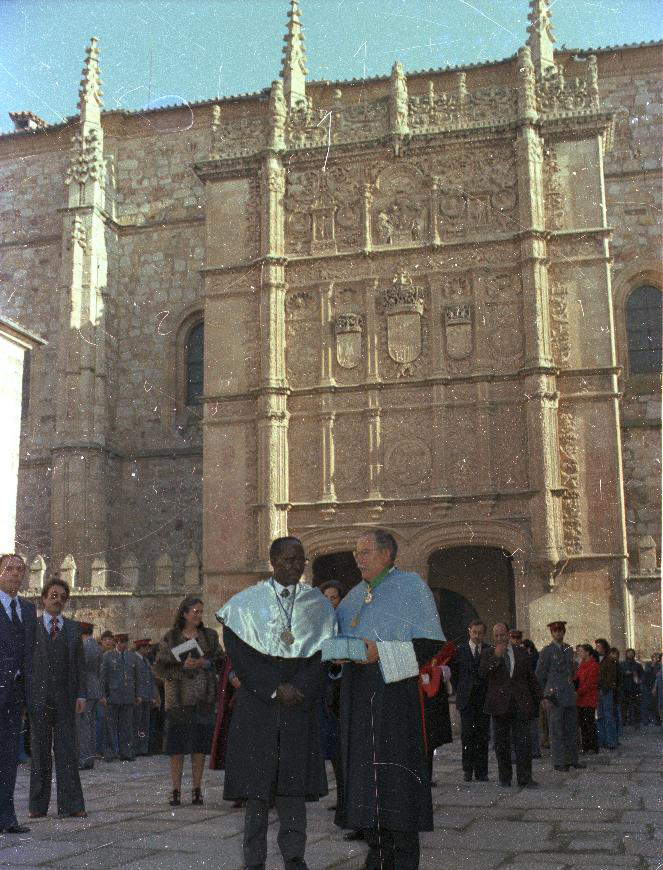
Senghor receives an honoris causa from the University of Salamanca in 1978

Senghor received several honours in the course of his life. He was made Grand-Croix of the Légion d'honneur, Grand-Croix of the l'Ordre national du Mérite, commander of arts and letters. He also received academic palms and the Grand Cross of the National Order of the Lion. His war exploits earned him the Reconnaissance Franco-alliée Medal of 1939–1945 and the Combattant Cross of 1939–1945. He received honorary doctorates from thirty-seven universities.

Senghor received the Commemorative Medal of the 2500th Anniversary of the founding of the Persian Empire on 14 October 1971.

On 13 November 1978, he was created a Knight of the Collar of the Order of Isabella the Catholic of Spain. Members of the order at the rank of Knight and above enjoy personal nobility and have the privilege of adding a golden heraldic mantle to their coats of arms. Those at the rank of the Collar also receive the official style "His or Her Most Excellent Lord".

In 1978, Senghor received an honoris causa from the University of Salamanca.

In 1983, he was awarded the Dr. Leopold Lucas Prize by the University of Tübingen.

The Senghor French Language International University, named after him was officially opened in Alexandria in 1990.

In 1994, he was awarded the Lifetime Achievement Award by the African Studies Association; however, there was controversy about whether he met the standard of contributing "a lifetime record of outstanding scholarship in African studies and service to the Africanist community." Michael Mbabuike, president of the New York African Studies Association (NYASA), said that the award also honours those who have worked "to make the world a better place for mankind."

The airport of Dakar was renamed Aéroport International Léopold Sédar Senghor in 1996, on his 90th birthday.

The Passerelle Solférino in Paris was renamed after him in 2006, on the centenary of his birth.

=== Acknowledgement ===
- Member of the Académie française
- Member of the Académie des Sciences Morales et Politiques
- Member of the Bayerische Akademie der Schönen Künste
- Member of the Royal Academy of Morocco
- Honorary Fellow of the Sahitya Akademi

=== Honorary degrees ===
- Mzuzu University
- Paris-Sorbonne University
- Harvard University
- Yale University
- University of Oxford
- Université catholique de Louvain
- Université de Montréal
- Université Laval
- Goethe University Frankfurt
- University of Vienna
- University of Salzburg
- Paris Descartes University
- University of Bordeaux
- University of Strasbourg
- Nancy 2 University
- University of Padua
- University of Salamanca
- University of Évora
- Federal University of Bahia

== Honours ==
=== Senegalese national honours ===
Ribbon bar	Honour
SEN Order of the Lion - Grand Cross BAR	Grand Master & Collar of the National Order of the Lion
Order of Merit - Grand Cross (Senegal) - ribbon bar	Grand Master & Collar of the National Order of Merit

=== Foreign honours ===
Ribbon bar	Country	Honour
FIN Order of the White Rose Grand Cross BAR	Finland	Grand Cross of the Order of the White Rose of Finland
	France	Grand Cross of the National Order of the Legion of Honour
	France	Grand Cross of the National Order of Merit
Palmes academiques Commandeur ribbon	France	Commander of the Ordre des Palmes académiques (Officer: 13 October 1947)
Ordre des Arts et des Lettres Commandeur ribbon	France	Commander of the Ordre des Arts et des Lettres
Croix du Combattant (1930 France) ribbon	France	Volunteer combatant's cross
25th Anniversary Medal 1971	Iran	Commemorative Medal of the 2,500 year celebration of the Persian Empire
	Italy	Knight Grand Cross with Collar Order of Merit of the Italian Republic
	Morocco	First Class of the Order of Intellectual Merit
PRT Order of Saint James of the Sword - Grand Collar BAR	Portugal	Grand Collar of the Military Order of Saint James of the Sword
	South Korea	Grand Cross of the Grand Order of Mugunghwa
	Spain	Knight of the Collar of the Order of Isabella the Catholic
Order of the Republic (Tunisia) - ribbon bar	Tunisia	Grand Cordon of the Order of the Republic
TN Order Merit Rib	Tunisia	Grand Collar of the National Order of Merit of Tunisia
	Vatican	Knight of the Order of Pope Pius IX
	Yugoslavia	Great Star of the Order of the Yugoslav Star

== Poetry ==
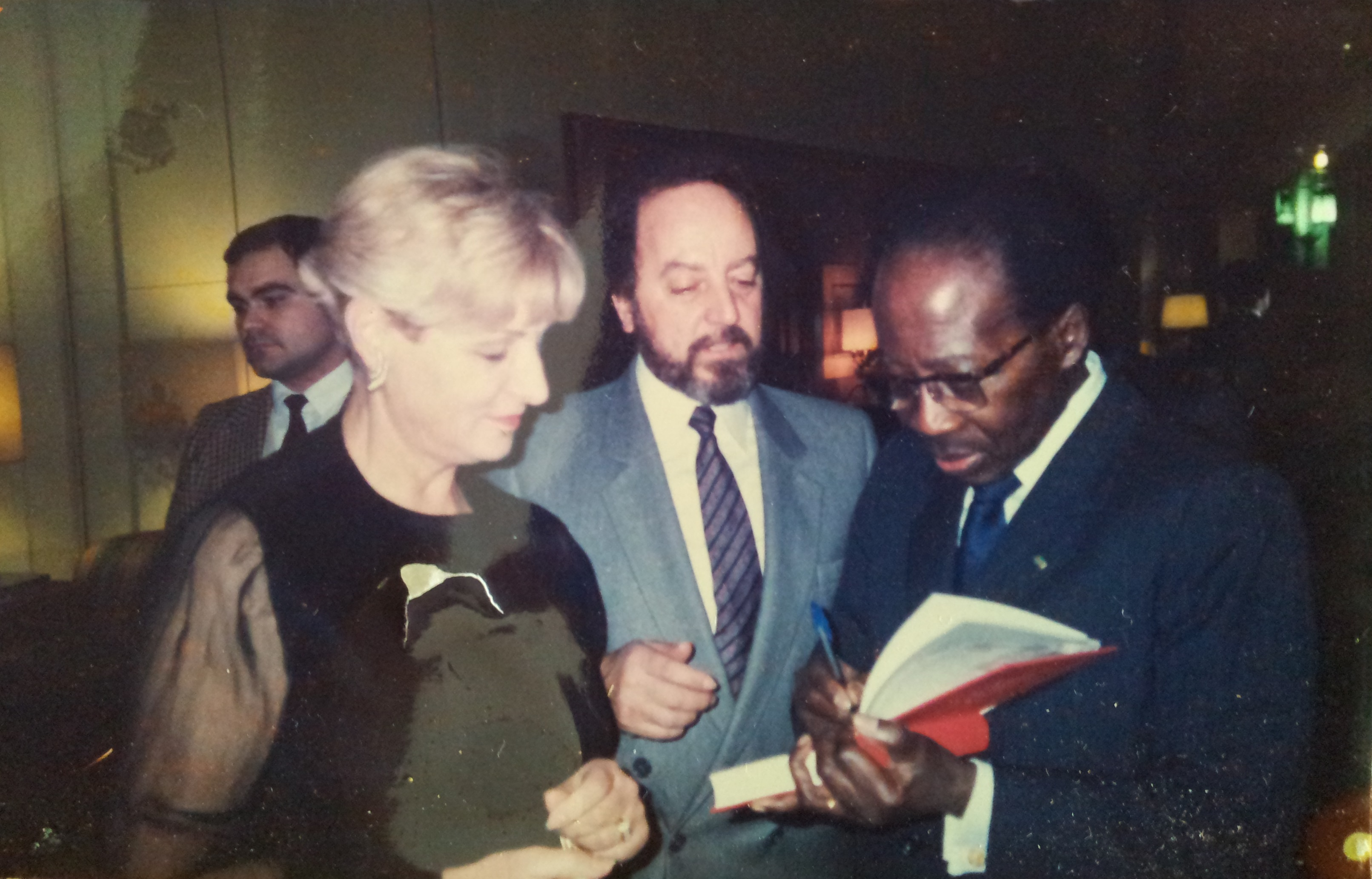
Senghor signing a copy of his Poèmes, Universita degli Studi di Genova, January 1988.

His poetry was widely acclaimed, and in 1978 he was awarded the Prix mondial Cino Del Duca. His poem "A l'appel de la race de Saba", published in 1936, was inspired by the entry of Italian troops in Addis Ababa. In 1948, Senghor compiled and edited a volume of Francophone poetry called Anthologie de la nouvelle poésie nègre et malgache for which Jean-Paul Sartre wrote an introduction, entitled "Orphée Noir" (Black Orpheus).

For his epitaph was a poem he had written, namely:

Quand je serai mort, mes amis, couchez-moi sous Joal-l'Ombreuse.
Sur la colline au bord du Mamanguedy, près l'oreille du sanctuaire des Serpents.
Mais entre le Lion couchez-moi et l'aïeule Tening-Ndyae.
Quand je serai mort mes amis, couchez-moi sous Joal-la-Portugaise.
Des pierres du Fort vous ferez ma tombe, et les canons garderont le silence.
Deux lauriers roses-blanc et rose-embaumeront la Signare.

When I'm dead, my friends, place me below Shadowy Joal,
On the hill, by the bank of the Mamanguedy, near the ear of Serpents' Sanctuary.
But place me between the Lion and ancestral Tening-Ndyae.
When I'm dead, my friends, place me beneath Portuguese Joal.
Of stones from the Fort build my tomb, and cannons will keep quiet.
Two oleanders – white and pink – will perfume the Signare.

== Négritude ==
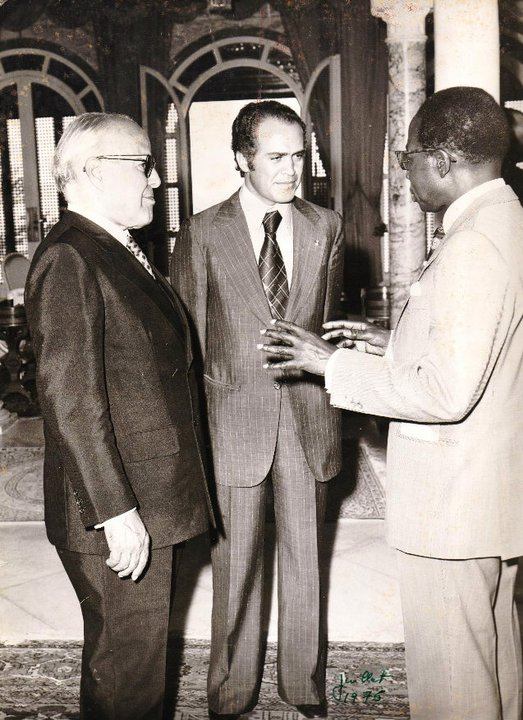
Senghor with Habib Bourguiba and Mohamed Sayah, Carthage Palace, 1980

With Aimé Césaire and Léon Damas, Senghor created the concept of Négritude, an important intellectual movement that sought to assert and valorise what they believed to be distinctive African characteristics, values, and aesthetics. One of these African characteristics that Senghor theorised was asserted when he wrote "the Negro has reactions that are more lived, in the sense that they are more direct and concrete expressions of the sensation and of the stimulus, and so of the object itself with all its original qualities and power."

This was a reaction against the too-strong dominance of French culture in the colonies, and against the perception that Africa did not have a culture developed enough to stand alongside that of Europe. In that respect négritude owes significantly to the pioneering work of Leo Frobenius.

Building upon historical research identifying ancient Egypt with black Africa, Senghor argued that sub-Saharan Africa and Europe are in fact part of the same cultural continuum, reaching from Egypt to classical Greece, through Rome to the European colonial powers of the modern age. Négritude was by no means—as it has in many quarters been perceived—an anti-white racism, but rather emphasised the importance of dialogue and exchange among different cultures (e.g., European, African, Arab, etc.).

A related concept later developed in Mobutu's Zaire is that of authenticité or Authenticity.

=== Décalage ===
In colloquial French, the term décalage is used to describe jetlag, lag or a general discrepancy between two things. However, Senghor uses the term to describe the unevenness in the African Diaspora. The complete phrase he uses is "Il s'agit, en réalité, d'un simple décalage—dans le temps et dans l'espace", meaning that between Black Africans and African Americans there exists an inconsistency, both temporally and spatially.

The time element points to the advancing or delaying of a schedule or agenda, while the space aspect designates the displacing and shifting of an object. The term points to "a bias that refuses to pass over when one crosses the water". He asks, how can we expect any sort of solidarity or intimacy from two populations that diverged more than 500 years ago?

== Works of Senghor ==
- Prière aux masques (c. 1935 – published in collected works during the 1940s).
- Chants d'ombre (1945)
- Hosties noires (1948)
- Anthologie de la nouvelle poésie nègre et malgache (1948)
- La Belle Histoire de Leuk-le-Lièvre (1953)
- Éthiopiques (1956)
- Nocturnes (1961). (English tr. by Clive Wake and John O. Reed, Nocturnes, London: Heinemann Educational Books, 1969. African Writers Series 71)
- Nation et voie africaine du socialisme (1961)
- Pierre Teilhard de Chardin et la politique africaine (1962)
- Poèmes (1964).
- Lettres de d'hivernage (1973)
- Élégies majeures (1979)
- La Poésie de l'action: conversation avec Mohamed Aziza (1980)
- Ce que je crois (1988)

== See also ==
- Serer people
- List of Senegalese writers
