= Socialist Party of Senegal =

Political party in Senegal

Socialist Party of Senegal Parti socialiste du Sénégal
- Secretary: Aminata Mbengue Ndiaye
- Founder: Léopold Sédar Senghor
- Founded: 1958 (as UPS); 1976 (as PS)
- Preceded by: Senegalese Popular Bloc
- Headquarters: Hann Bel-Air, Dakar
- Ideology: Social democracy Democratic socialism 1958–1980: African nationalism African socialism Third Way; Planned liberalism
- Political position: Centre-left; 1958–1980: Left-wing
- National affiliation: Jàmm ak Njariñ
- Continental affiliation: League of African Democratic Socialist Parties
- International affiliation: Progressive Alliance; Socialist International
- Colors: Green, red
- National Assembly: 0 / 150

Website
- www.ps-senegal.sn

The Socialist Party of Senegal (French: Parti Socialiste du Sénégal, PS) is a political party in Senegal . It was the ruling party in Senegal from independence in 1960 until 2000. In 2000, the party's candidate and previous incumbent president, Abdou Diof, was defeated by the leader of the Senegalese Democratic Party, Abdoulaye Wade.

Ousmane Tanor Dieng has been the First Secretary of the Socialist Party of Senegal since 1996 and was the presidential candidate in 2007 and 2012. The best-known figure of the party was Léopold Sédar Senghor, the first president of Senegal. The Socialist Party of Senegal's goal is to work on the implementation of democratic socialism into Senegal's political atmosphere. The implementation of democratic socialism includes the establishment of an open, democratic, and humanitarian society while preserving African identity. Since 1976, the Socialist Party of Senegal is the official socialist party choice for the country.

The Socialist Party of Senegal is a full member of the Socialist International. As of 2018, there were about 1.2 million party members.

== Political history ==
The Socialist Party of Senegal was first created in 1958 right before Senegal gained independence. The Party was founded by Leopold Sedar Senghor and it was in power under him politically from 1960 to 1980. The Socialist Party of Senegal was initially known as the Senegalese Progressive Union (Union Progressiste Senegalaise, UPS). Senghor had founded the Senegalese Democratic Bloc in 1948 and in 1958 it merged with another political party to become the UPS. The UPS became the ruling party of Senegal in 1960 once independence was gained. The UPS officially was known as the Socialist Party of Senegal starting in 1976.

When Senegal gained independence in 1960, Senghor was unanimously elected president to Senegal's new republic system. He was elected president on 5 September 1960. He had served in the French Constituent Assembly since 1945, therefore he already had political experience when elected president. In the early 1960s, there was a personal and political rivalry between President Senghor and Prime Minister Mamadoua Dia. In 1962, there was a coup attempt. Dia accepted blame and was sent to prison as a result. A new constitution took effect in 1963 and Senegal's parliamentary system became a centralized presidential system. In 1963, Senghor ran unopposed for president and consequently won. By 1966, Senegal was considered a one-party state. This occurred because Senghor was running unopposed as president and the economic stability of Senegal began to fade. Senegal relied heavily on peanut-farming and this source of economic stability was in decline. Single-party rule prevented an overwhelming economic crisis and ensured social stability in Senegal, which was appealing to people in the country. In the 1990s, Senegal's status as a democracy was called into question because it seemed impossible to remove the Socialist Party of Senegal from office.

There was no legal political opposition to the Socialist Party of Senegal until 1974, which is when Abdoulaye Wade obtained legal permission from Senghor to create a new party. He created the Senegalese Democratic Party. Starting in 1978, Wade's party began to start winning seats in the National Assembly. This was the beginning of Senegal moving from an essentially single-party system into a more competitive system. Leopold Sedar Senghor voluntarily resigned from position of president in 1980 and Abdou Diouf came into power as Senghor's hand-picked successor. Senghor became the first African head of state to voluntarily retire.

In the 2000 presidential election, the Socialist Party of Senegal was defeated and was no longer the ruling party for the first time in 40 years. Abdou Diouf, the 19-year incumbent of the Socialist Party, was defeated by Abdoulaye Wade. The removal of Diouf from office by an election broke the political monopoly the Socialist Party had on Senegal and helped establish Senegal as one of the African countries with the most advanced democracies. Senegal became one of the first African countries to remove the head of government by voting instead of a coup or violent measures. Wade was the candidate from the Senegalese Democratic Party and had been the leader of the political opposition against the Socialist Party for about 25 years.

In the 2007 and 2012 presidential elections, Ousmane Tanor Dieng unsuccessfully ran. In 2007, the Socialist Party participated in a boycott of the June 2007 parliamentary elections and has not held seats in the National Assembly since. Since 2012 the party has run in the parliamentary elections as part of the United in Hope coalition, the coalition of the presidential majority in support of Macky Sall.

== Election results ==
=== Presidential elections ===
Senegal is a republic with a presidency. The president is elected every 7 years (previously every 5 years until 2001 and between 2007 and 2012) by the adult Senegalese population. The 2000 Senegalese presidential election ended 40 years of dominance by the Socialist Party of Senegal. The party's candidate, incumbent president Abdou Diouf, was defeated by the leader of the Senegalese Democratic Party, Abdoulaye Wade, in a second round of voting. Diouf received the most votes, 41.3%, in the first round, but in the second round he received only 41.51% against Wade. Ousmane Tanor Dieng was the party's candidate in the 2007 Senegalese presidential election; he took third place with 13.56% of the vote. He was also the candidate in the 2012 Senegalese presidential election and lost again. In the 2019 Senegalese presidential election, the party did not field a candidate.

| Election | Party candidate | Votes | % | Votes | % | Results |
| Election | Party candidate | First Round | | Second Round | | Results |
|---|---|---|---|---|---|---|
| 1963 | Léopold Sédar Senghor | 1,149,935 | 100% | —N/a | | Won ✓ |
| 1968 | Léopold Sédar Senghor | 1,229,927 | 100% | —N/a | | Won ✓ |
| 1973 | Léopold Sédar Senghor | 1,357,056 | 100% | —N/a | | Won ✓ |
| 1978 | Léopold Sédar Senghor | 807,515 | 82.2% | —N/a | | Won ✓ |
| 1983 | Abdou Diouf | 908,879 | 83.45% | —N/a | | Won ✓ |
| 1988 | Abdou Diouf | 828,301 | 73.20% | —N/a | | Won ✓ |
| 1993 | Abdou Diouf | 757,311 | 58.40% | —N/a | | Won ✓ |
| 2000 | Abdou Diouf | 690,917 | 41.30% | 687,969 | 41.51% | Lost ✗ |
| 2007 | Ousmane Tanor Dieng | 464,287 | 13.56% | —N/a | | Lost ✗ |
| 2012 | Ousmane Tanor Dieng | 305,924 | 11.30% | —N/a | | Lost ✗ |

=== National Assembly elections ===
The parliament in Senegal is unicameral and is currently made up of the National Assembly, which has 165 seats (the number of seats have gradually increased over past elections). There has been periods (1999 to 2001 and 2007 to 2012) where Senegal has also had a Senate, but it was abolished by a constitutional referendum in 2001 and then abolished a second time in 2012. Elections are held every 5 years.

The Socialist Party of Senegal has held seats in the National Assembly since it was created until 2007. The Socialist Party of Senegal also previously held Senegalese seats in the French National Assembly starting in 1951 and held 43 out of 50 seats in Senegal's Territorial Assembly starting in 1952.

Since independence, in the 1963, 1968, and 1973 elections the Socialist Party had full control of the National Assembly. In 1973 they lost 18 out of 100 seats to the Senegalese Democratic Party. In the years after they increasingly lost more seats in the National Assembly. The Socialist Party of Senegal finally lost majority in the National Assembly in April 2001 when the Senegalese Democratic Party won 89 of the 120 seats. In the 2001 election, the party only won 17.4% of the popular vote and 10 out of 120 seats.

In June 2007, the Socialist Party of Senegal boycotted the parliamentary elections. They have not held seats in the National Assembly since then, holding zero seats in 2007, 2012, and 2017. Since 2012 the party has run in the parliamentary elections as part of the United in Hope coalition, the coalition of the presidential majority in support of Macky Sall.

| Election | Party leader | Votes | % | Seats | +/– | Position | Outcome |
|---|---|---|---|---|---|---|---|
| 1959 | Léopold Sédar Senghor | 682,365 | 83.0% | 80 / 80 | New | ▲1st | Won all seats |
| 1963 | Léopold Sédar Senghor | 1,132,518 | 94.20% | 80 / 80 | Steady | 1st | Won all seats |
| 1968 | Léopold Sédar Senghor | 1,209,984 | 100% | 80 / 80 | Steady | 1st | Sole legal party |
| 1973 | Léopold Sédar Senghor | 1,355,306 | 100% | 100 / 100 | ▲20 | 1st | Sole legal party |
| 1978 | Léopold Sédar Senghor | 790,799 | 81.74% | 82 / 100 | ▼18 | 1st | Supermajority |
| 1983 | Abdou Diouf | 862,713 | 79.94% | 111 / 120 | ▲29 | 1st | Supermajority |
| 1988 | Abdou Diouf | 794,559 | 71.34% | 103 / 120 | ▼8 | 1st | Supermajority |
| 1993 | Abdou Diouf | 602,171 | 56.56% | 84 / 120 | ▼19 | 1st | Supermajority |
| 1998 | Abdou Diouf | 612,559 | 50.2% | 93 / 140 | ▲9 | 1st | Supermajority |
| 2001 | Ousmane Tanor Dieng | 326,126 | 17.4% | 10 / 120 | ▼83 | ▼3rd | Opposition |
| 2007 | Ousmane Tanor Dieng | Election boycotted | | 0 / 150 | ▼10 | —N/a | Extra-parliamentary |
| 2012 (Note: Run within United in Hope coalition) | Ousmane Tanor Dieng | 1,040,899 | 53.06 | —N/a | —N/a | ▲1st | Coalition (United in Hope) |
| 2017 | Ousmane Tanor Dieng | 1,637,761 | 49.47 | —N/a | —N/a | 1st | Coalition (United in Hope) |
| 2022 | Vacant | 1,518,137 | 46.56 | —N/a | —N/a | 1st | Coalition (United in Hope) |
| 2024 (Note: Run as part of the Jàmm ak Njariñ coalition.) | Aminata Mbengue Ndiaye | 330,865 | 9.13 | —N/a | —N/a | ▼3rd | Opposition |

== See also ==
- Combat pour le socialisme
