= List of political parties in Senegal =

This article lists political parties in Senegal. Senegal presently has a multi-party system.

== Parties represented in the National Assembly ==
Coalition	Party	Abbr.	Leader	Political position	Ideology	MPs
African Patriots of Senegal for Work, Ethics and Fraternity; Patriotes africains du Sénégal pour le travail, l'éthique et la fraternité		PASTEF	Ousmane Sonko	Left-wing	Left-wing populism Pan-Africanism	130 / 165
Takku Wallu Sénégal "Stand Up to Save Senegal"	Alliance for the Republic; Alliance pour la république	APR	Macky Sall	Centre-right	Economic liberalism Social conservatism	16 / 165
Takku Wallu Sénégal "Stand Up to Save Senegal"	Senegalese Democratic Party; Parti démocratique sénégalais	PDS	Karim Wade	Centre	Liberalism; Economic liberalism	16 / 165
Takku Wallu Sénégal "Stand Up to Save Senegal"	Rewmi; Rewmi	Rewmi	Idrissa Seck	Centre	Liberalism; Economic liberalism	16 / 165
Takku Wallu Sénégal "Stand Up to Save Senegal"	Democratic Convergence "Bokk Gis Gis"; Convergence démocratique Bokk Gis Gis	BGG	Pape Diop	Centre	Liberalism; Economic liberalism	16 / 165
Takku Wallu Sénégal "Stand Up to Save Senegal"	Union of Centrists of Senegal; Union des Centristes du Sénégal	UCS	Abdoulaye Baldé	Centre	Centrism; Liberalism	16 / 165
Jàmm ak Njariñ; Peace and Prosperity	New Responsibility; Nouvelle responsabilité	NR	Amadou Ba	Centre-left	Social democracy	7 / 165
Jàmm ak Njariñ; Peace and Prosperity	Socialist Party of Senegal; Parti socialiste	PS	Aminata Mbengue Ndiaye	Centre-left	Social democracy Democratic socialism	7 / 165
Jàmm ak Njariñ; Peace and Prosperity	Alliance of the Forces of Progress; Alliance des forces de progrès	AFP	Moustapha Niasse	Centre-left	Social democracy	7 / 165
Jàmm ak Njariñ; Peace and Prosperity	Democratic League; Ligue démocratique	LD/MPT	Mamadou Ndoye	Left-wing	Socialism	7 / 165
Jàmm ak Njariñ; Peace and Prosperity	Party of Independence and Labour; Parti de l'Indépendance et du Travail	PIT	Maguette Thiam	Left-wing	Socialism	7 / 165
Sàmm Sa Kàddu; Protecting Your Word	Coalition for the Revival of Senegal; Manko Taxawu Sénégal	MTS	Khalifa Sall	Centre	Liberalism; Social liberalism	3 / 165
Sàmm Sa Kàddu; Protecting Your Word	Party for Unity and Rally; Parti de l'Unité et du Rassemblement	PUR	Serigne Moustapha Sy	Right-wing	Islamic democracy Social conservatism	3 / 165
Sàmm Sa Kàddu; Protecting Your Word	Alternative for Citizen Succession; Alternative pour la relève citoyenne	ARC	Anta Babacar Ngom	Centre-left	Progressivism; Youth politics	3 / 165
Sàmm Sa Kàddu; Protecting Your Word	The Servants; Les Serviteurs	LS	Pape Djibril Fall	Centre	Liberalism; Economic liberalism	3 / 165
Sàmm Sa Kàddu; Protecting Your Word	Generational Alliance for the Interests of the Republic; Alliance générationelle pour les intérêts de la République	AGIR	Thierno Bocoum	Centre-right	Liberal conservatism	3 / 165
Sàmm Sa Kàddu; Protecting Your Word	Gueum Sa Bopp	GSB	Bougane Gueye Dany	Centre	Liberalism; Economic liberalism	3 / 165
Sàmm Sa Kàddu; Protecting Your Word	Republican Party for the Progress; Parti républicain pour le Progrès	PRP	Déthié Fall	Centre-left	Social democracy	3 / 165
The March of the Territories / Andu Nawlé		LMDT/AN	Maguette Séne			2 / 165
Farlu		Farlu				1 / 165
The Nationalists / Jël Linu Moom		LN/JLM				1 / 165
Kiraay ak Natangue		KaN				1 / 165
Sénégaal Kese		SK				1 / 165
Sopi Senegal		Sopi				1 / 165
And Ci Koolutè Nguir Senegal		ACKNS				1 / 165
And Beesal Sénégal		ABS				1 / 165

== Other parties ==
- African Independence Party (Majhemout Diop)
- African Party for the Independence of the Masses
- Alliance for Progress and Justice/Jëf-Jël (Alliance pour le Progrès et la Justice/Jëf-Jël)
- And-Jëf/African Party for Democracy and Socialism (And-Jëf/Parti Africain pour la démocratie et le socialisme) (Landing Savané, secretary general)
- Democratic League/Movement for the Labour Party (Ligue Démocratique-Mouvement pour le Parti du Travail) [Dr. Abdoulaye Bathily]
- Front for Socialism and Democracy/Benno Jubël (Cheikh Abdoulaye Dieye)
- Gainde Centrist Bloc (Jean-Paul Dias)
- Movement for the Liberation of the Senegalese People (Louis Jacques Senghor)
- Movement for Rebirth, Liberty and Development/MRLD ("Mouvement pour la Renaissance, la Liberté et le Développement") (Abdourahmane Sarr)
- Movement of Leftwing Radicals
- National Democratic Rally (Rassemblement National Démocratique) [Madier DIOUF]
- National Movement of Servants of the Masses
- Party for Solidarity and Development of Senegal – Sunu Party
- Party for Truth and Development (Parti pour la vérité et le développement) (Sokhna Dieng Mbacké)
- Party of Independence and Work (Parti de l'Indépendance et du Travail) (Amath Dansokho)
- Rally of the Ecologists of Senegal (Rassemblement des écologistes du Sénégal – Les Verts)
- Senegalese Democratic Party-Renewal (Serigne Lamine Diop, secretary general)
- Senegalese Democratic Union-Renewal (Mamadou Puritain Fall)
- Senegalese Patriotic Rally/Jammi Rewmi (Rassemblement patriotique sénégalais)
- Union for Democratic Renewal (Union pour le renouveau démocratique) (Djibo Leyti Kâ)
- Union for Progress and Renewal (Doudou Ndoye)
- United to Boost Senegal (Wolof:Benno Siggil Senegaal)

=== Historical ===
- African Autonomist Movement
- African Regroupment Party-Renewal
- African Regroupment Party-Senegal
- And-Jëf / Revolutionary Movement for New Democracy
- Bolshevik Nuclei
- Committee for the Initiative for Permanent Revolutionary Action
- Communist Workers League
- Convention of Democrats and Patriots (Garab-Gi)
- Democratic Rally
- Independent Socialist Republican Party
- Party for Progress and Citizenship
- Reenu-Rew
- Senegalese Communist Party
- Senegalese Democratic Bloc
- Senegalese Democratic Union
- Senegalese Liberal Party
- Senegalese Party of Socialist Action
- Senegalese Popular Bloc
- Senegalese Popular Movement
- Senegalese Republican Movement
- Senegalese Socialist Party
- Senegalese Solidarity Party
- Socialist Movement of the Senegalese Union
- Socialist Workers Organisation

=== Historical alliances ===
- Antiimperialist Action Front-Suxxali Reew Mi
- Popular Front

=== Historical local parties ===
- Casamancian Autonomous Movement
- Democratic Bloc of Diambour
- Democratic Regroupment of Kolda
- Independent Party of Sine Saloum
- Independent Party of the Community of the Cap-Vert Peninsula
- Labour Party of Sine Saloum
- List for the Defence of the Interests of Commune of Linguère
- Party for the Defence of the Interests of Kolda
- Thiesian Democratic Front

== See also ==
- Politics of Senegal
