= Sunu =

Sunu may refer to:

- Sunu, Iran, a village in South Khorasan Province
- Gilles Sunu, French footballer of Togolese descent
- Manu Sunu, Togolese footballer
- Sastha Sunu, Indonesian film editor
- Party for Solidarity and Development of Senegal – Sunu Party
- Sunü, the divine sister of the Chinese war and sex goddess Jiutian Xuannü
