= 1956 French legislative election in Senegal =

Elections to the French National Assembly were held in Senegal on 2 January 1956 as part of the wider French elections. Two members were elected from the territory, both of which were won by the Senegalese Democratic Bloc. Mamadou Dia and Léopold Sédar Senghor were the two elected members.

== Results ==
Party	Votes	%	Seats	+/–
Senegalese Democratic Bloc	346,266	76.12	2	0
SFIO−MAC	101,732	22.36	0	0
Senegalese Democratic Union	6,888	1.51	0	New
Total	454,886	100.00	2	0
Valid votes	454,886	99.53		
Invalid/blank votes	2,128	0.47		
Total votes	457,014	100.00		
Registered voters/turnout	835,035	54.73		
Source: Sternberger et al.
