= Mbaye-Jacques Diop =

Senegalese politician

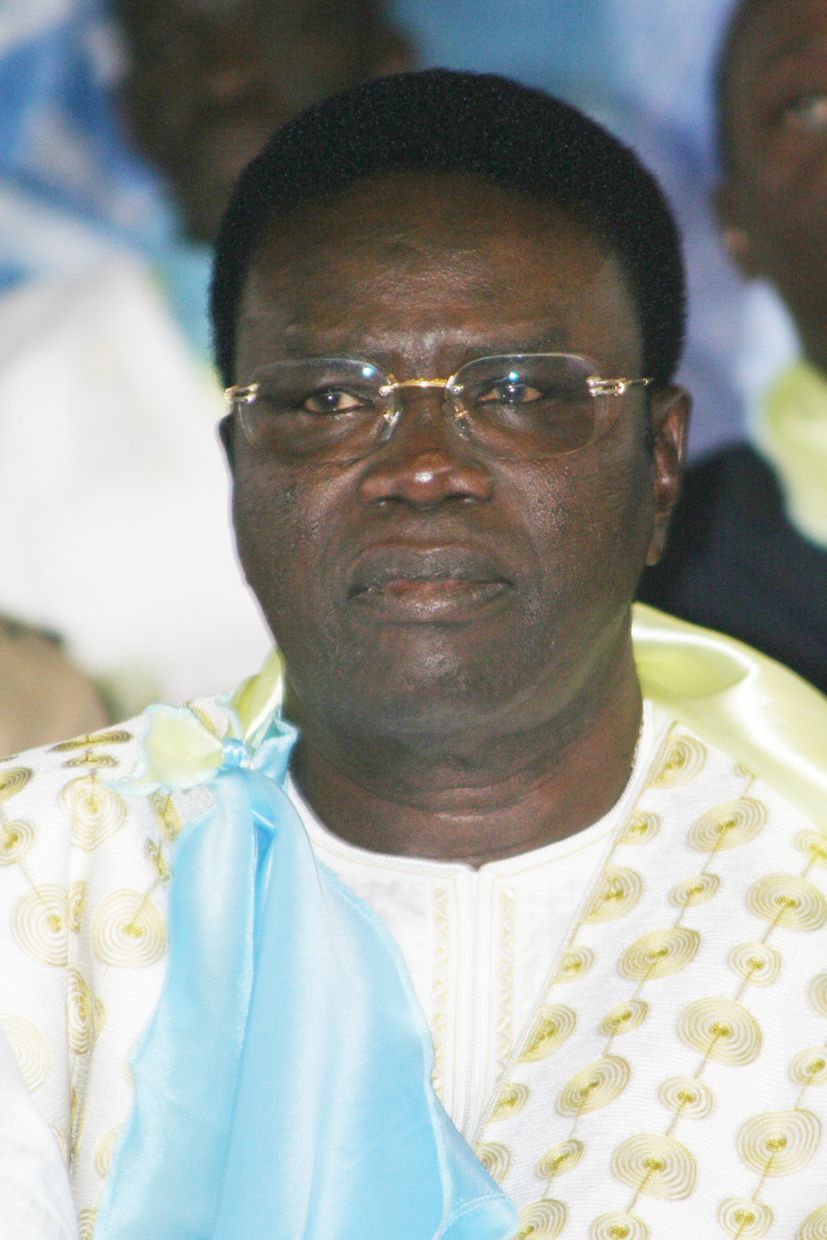
- Diop in 2008
- In office 1983–2004

Personal details
- Born: 15 January 1936 Rufisque, Senegal
- Died: 11 September 2016 (aged 80)
- Party: Socialist Party; Party for Progress and Citizenship; Senegalese Democratic Party
- Occupation: Politician

Mbaye-Jacques Diop (15 January 1936 – 11 September 2016) was a Senegalese politician. He served as a Deputy in the National Assembly of Senegal from 1983 to 2004, as Mayor of Rufisque from 1987 to 2002, and as President of the Council of the Republic for Economic and Social Affairs (CRAES) from 2004 to 2007. He was a long-time member of the Socialist Party (PS), but split from the PS to form his own party, the Party for Progress and Citizenship (PPC), in 2000, before merging that party into the Senegalese Democratic Party (PDS) two years later.

== Biography ==
=== Early career ===
Diop was born in Rufisque in 1936 and joined the Youth Movement of the Senegalese Democratic Bloc in 1954 as a founding member. He became the Secretary-General for Organization and Propaganda of the Youth Union of the Senegalese Popular Bloc in 1957; after the Bloc was transformed into the Senegalese Progressive Union, he continued to hold the same post in its youth movement until 1964. Additionally, he was successively a member of the Political Bureau of the Bloc and then the Senegalese Progressive Union from 1957 to 1967. At the Cotonou congress of the African Regroupment Party in July 1958, Diop was a delegate representing the youth of Senegal; he was subsequently the Secretary for Foreign Relations of the National Youth Union of Mali from 1959 to 1960. He was first elected as a municipal councillor in Rufisque in 1964 and was continuously re-elected during the subsequent decades.

Later, Diop was the Director of the PS Cadre School, which he founded, from 1975 to 1980; also during that period, he was Coordinator of the PS Study and Reflection Group (GER) from 1976 to 1978 and was Permanent Secretary of the PS Political Bureau from 1977 to 1980. He was the Secretary-General of the PS Communal Coordination from 1982 to 1990. Diop was elected to the National Assembly in 1983, 1988, 1993, and 1998 elections as a PS candidate; he also became Mayor of Rufisque in 1987 and was Vice-President of the Association of Mayors of Senegal from 1988 to 2002. Additionally, he held the posts of Secretary-General of the PS Regional Union in Dakar and First Vice-President of the Urban Community of Dakar from 1990 to 2000. In the National Assembly, Diop was President of the Laws and Human Rights Commission from 1996 to 2000 and President of the Defense and Security Commission from 2000 to 2001.

=== Party split ===
Shortly before the first round of the 2000 presidential election, violence broke out between supporters of the PS and the opposition in Rufisque on 23 February 2000; there were six injuries, and two homes owned by Diop were set on fire. He described it as "a grave sign for democracy in Senegal". After the first round, Diop resigned from the PS on 2 March 2000, choosing to support opposition candidate Abdoulaye Wade against the incumbent president and PS candidate Abdou Diouf and joining a pro-Wade alliance, the Front for the Alternance. According to Diop, his defection "dealt a severe political, electoral and psychological blow to the PS and its candidate, Abdou Diouf", who was defeated by Wade in the second round. He then founded a new party, the PPC, on 30 May 2000, becoming its Secretary-General. Subsequently, he was elected to the National Assembly as a PPC candidate through national list proportional representation in the April 2001 parliamentary election; he was the only PPC candidate to win a seat.

The PPC merged itself into Wade's party, the PDS, on 20 May 2002; Diop became the National Political Secretary of the PDS at that time. Also in 2002, Diop left his position as Mayor of Rufisque, becoming Honorary Mayor instead. He joined the National Political Administration of the PDS in May 2003 and joined the PDS Steering Committee in May 2004. Wade then appointed Diop as President of the CRAES when that body was created in August 2004. Diop also became President of the Union of Economic and Social Councils and Similar Institutions of La Francophonie in June 2007. On 1 October 2007, Wade asked Diop to resign from his position as President of the CRAES, while stressing that he did not have a dispute with Diop and did not want to start one. However, Diop was unwilling to resign, saying that he had done nothing wrong and that people would not understand if he left his post before the end of his five-year term in August 2009. On 4 October, when Diop was preparing to travel to a meeting of the Union of Economic and Social Councils and Similar Institutions of La Francophonie, Wade barred him from leaving the country. After Iba Der Thiam mediated the situation, Diop agreed to resign on 16 November, but Wade nevertheless criticized Diop at a meeting of the PDS Steering Committee, saying that he had wasted 300 million CFA francs on "whimisical missions". Wade dissolved the CRAES on 21 November 2007 and established a new Economic and Social Council in its place.

On 13 February 2008, the Grand Marabout of the Mourides, Serigne Mouhamadou Lamine Bara Mbacké, asked Diop to return from Paris to meet with Wade in Dakar on 14 February. Wade and Diop accordingly met at the presidential palace and discussed the reasons for Wade's dissolution of the CRAES. On this occasion, Wade complained that Diop had failed to campaign for him in the February 2007 presidential election. Diop said that he had created a slogan supporting Wade's candidacy and that he had toured the regional capitals to speak in support of Wade's candidacy. Wade also said that he had heard that Diop had boasted that Wade could not act against him; Diop replied that he could not simultaneously support Wade's re-election and defy his authority. Wade told Diop he no longer had any complaint against him, "especially as my marabout asks it of me". Diop subsequently went to Touba to thank the Grand Marabout for his intervention on 16 February.

Diop said on 16 September 2009 that he did not favor moves to eliminate the two-round system for presidential elections, arguing that it would be less democratic to decide the outcome in a single round. He nevertheless expressed his firm support for President Wade's planned 2012 re-election bid.
