= 1952 Guinean Territorial Assembly election =

Territorial Assembly elections were held in French Guinea on 30 March 1952.

== Electoral system ==
The 50-member General Council was elected by groups; the First College (French citizens) elected 18 members and the Second College elected 32 members.

== Results ==
Party	Votes	%	Seats
First College
Union for the Defence of the Interest of Upper Guinea and the Forest	1,331		4
Economic and Social Union and Action	786		9
Rally of the French People	544		5
Other parties			0
Total			18
Total votes	3,251	–	
Registered voters/turnout	5,253	61.89	
Second College
French Section of the Workers' International			15
Indépendants d'outre-mer			4
Mandé Union			4
Forestry Union			3
African Democratic Rally			1
Other parties			0
Independents			5
Total			32
Total votes	247,358	–	
Registered voters/turnout	420,497	58.83	
Source: De Benoist
