= African Independence Party =

Communist party in French West Africa

The African Independence Party (French: Parti Africain de l'Indépendance, PAI) was a communist party in French West Africa (AOF). PAI was founded in Thiès, Senegal, in 1957. Later as AOF was dissolved into independent countries the local PAI sections became independent parties, often keeping the name PAI.

PAI was the first party in AOF to unequivocally demand independence from French rule.

In Senegal PAI was banned on August 1, 1960.

In Senegal the following parties trace/traced their origin back to PAI:

- Party of Independence and Labour (PIT, technically the original PAI)
- African Independence Party – Renewal (legally registered as PAI)
- Democratic League/Movement for the Labour Party
- Senegalese Communist Party (short-lived pro-Chinese faction)

In Upper Volta/Burkina Faso PAI was established in 1963. PAI attained importance through its mass front Patriotic League for Development (LIPAD). Today LIPAD is dissolved, and PAI has split in two factions:

- African Independence Party (Ouédraogo). Technically the original PAI
  - Party for Democracy and Socialism
    - Party for Democracy and Socialism/Metba
- African Independence Party (Touré), legally recognized as PAI
  - Party of Independence, Labour and Justice

== List of founders of PAI ==
- Madame Basse
- M. Basse
- Coupet Camara
- Seydou Cissokho
- Adama Diagne
- Oumar Diallo
- Birahim Diawara Birahim
- Majhemout Diop
- Bouna Fall
- Abdou Ka
- Alioune Kamara
- Malick Kamara
- Basile Khaly
- Tidiane Baïdy Ly
- Abdou Moumouni
- Abdoulaye Ndiaye
- Samba Ndiaye
- Samba
- Khalilou Sall
- Ousmane Santara
- Bacirou Sarr
- Moussé Guèye Seck
- Ahmed Sékou Touré
