= FDT =

FDT may refer to:

== Organizations ==
- Democratic Federation of Labour (French: Fédération Démocratique du Travail), a Moroccan trade union
- Democratic Front of Chad (French: Front Démocratique du Tchad), a political party in Chad
- Thiesian Democratic Front (French: Front Démocratique Thiesois), a political party in Senegal

== Science and technology ==
- File descriptor table
- Flattened device tree
- Fluctuation–dissipation theorem
- Future-directed therapy, a form of psychotherapy
- Powerflasher FDT, a software application

== Other uses ==
- "FDT" (song) (Fuck Donald Trump), 2016 song by YG and featuring Nipsey Hussle
  - Protests against Donald Trump, for sentiment against the US president
