= 1952 Senegalese Territorial Assembly election =

Territorial Assembly elections were held in Senegal on 30 March 1952. The Senegalese Democratic Bloc won 41 of the 50 seats.

== Electoral system ==
Unlike other French colonies in Africa which used a dual college system, with French citizens electing part of the General Council and Africans electing the remainder, the Senegalese General Council was elected on a general roll.

== Results ==
Party	Votes	%	Seats
Senegalese Democratic Bloc	224,122	70.17	41
French Section of the Workers' International	95,296	29.83	9
Others			0
Total	319,418	100.00	50
Valid votes	319,418	98.27	
Invalid/blank votes	5,610	1.73	
Total votes	325,028	–	
Registered voters/turnout	660,655	46.20	
Source: De Benoist
