= PRSI =

Prsi or PRSI may refer to:

- Prší, a card game
- Independent Socialist Republican Party, Senegal (French: Parti Républicain Socialiste Indépendant)
- Pay Related Social Insurance, a tax in Ireland
- Public Relations Society of India, in India, Jaipur Chapter
- Pasadena Refining System, a refinery in Texas
