= Seydou Cissokho =

Senegalese politician (1929–1986)

Seydou Cissokho (September 6, 1929 – March 10, 1986) was a Senegalese politician.

== Youth ==
Cissokho was born at Bakel. His father worked as a blacksmith. The young Cissokho became a school teacher. He finished his secondary education in 1949. He worked in the countryside, later beginning to teach in Kaolack and Dakar.

== Political activist ==
Cissokho was also involved in the struggle against French colonial rule. During his years as a student he had joined the Communist Study Groups (GEC). He also became a member of the African Democratic Rally (RDA). He took part in founding the African Independence Party (PAI, later renamed the Party of Independence and Labour, PIT), the first Marxist-Leninist political party in West Africa, in 1957. Following the ban on the party in 1960, Cissokho was active in underground organizing work. He lost his employment as a result of his political work.

== Party leader ==
The 1962 party executive committee meeting held in Bamako confirmed Cissokho as the deputy general secretary of the Central Committee. In 1967 an extraordinary conference placed Cissokho at the helm of a provisional committee to lead the party. Within the party Cissokho represented a hard-line, pro-Soviet Marxist-Leninist position.

The first party congress, held illegally in Senegal in 1972, confirmed the expulsion of the PAI general secretary Majhmoud Diop and elected Cissokho as party general secretary. Cissokho played an important role in organizing the first conference of Communist and Workers' Parties of Tropical and Southern Africa.

== PIT legalized ==
Cissokho spent two decades as leader of the underground party. In 1981 PIT was legalized and Cissokho led the efforts for the formation of an anti-imperialist united front. He was elected party chairman at the second PIT congress, held in 1984.

Cissokho died in Moscow whilst visiting the 1986 Congress of the Communist Party of the Soviet Union.
