= Joseph Mbaye =

Senegalese teacher and politician

Minister of Rural Economy
- In office May 20, 1957 – November 1962

Minister of Transport and Telecommunications
- In office November 12, 1962 – December 18, 1962
- Preceded by: Alioune Tall
- Succeeded by: Alioune Badara Mbengue

Personal details
- Born: 2 July 1917 Rufisque French West Africa
- Died: May 9, 1997 (aged 79) Dakar, Senegal
- Party: BDS, BPS
- Occupation: Teacher

Joseph Mbaye (1917-1991) is a Senegalese teacher and politician who served as minister pre and post Senegal independence. He served as the Minister of Transport and Telecommunications until December 1962 when he was arrested Mamadou Dia and three other Senegal ministers by the government of Léopold Sédar Senghor for "attempted coup d'état".
