= Independent Socialists =

Independent Socialists may refer to:

- Independent Socialists (France)
- Independent Socialists (Latvia)
- Independent Socialists (Spain)
- International Socialists (United States), a group formed out of the Independent Socialist Clubs of America
- Independent Socialists (Venezuela)
- Independent Socialists of Extremadura

== See also ==
- Independent-Socialist Party
- Independent Socialist Faction
- Independent Socialist Party (Bolivia)
- Independent Socialist Party (Bolivia, 1944)
- Independent Socialist Party (Netherlands)
- Independent Socialist Party (Romania)
- Independent Socialist Republican Party
