= Amath Dansokho =

Senegalese politician (1937–2019)

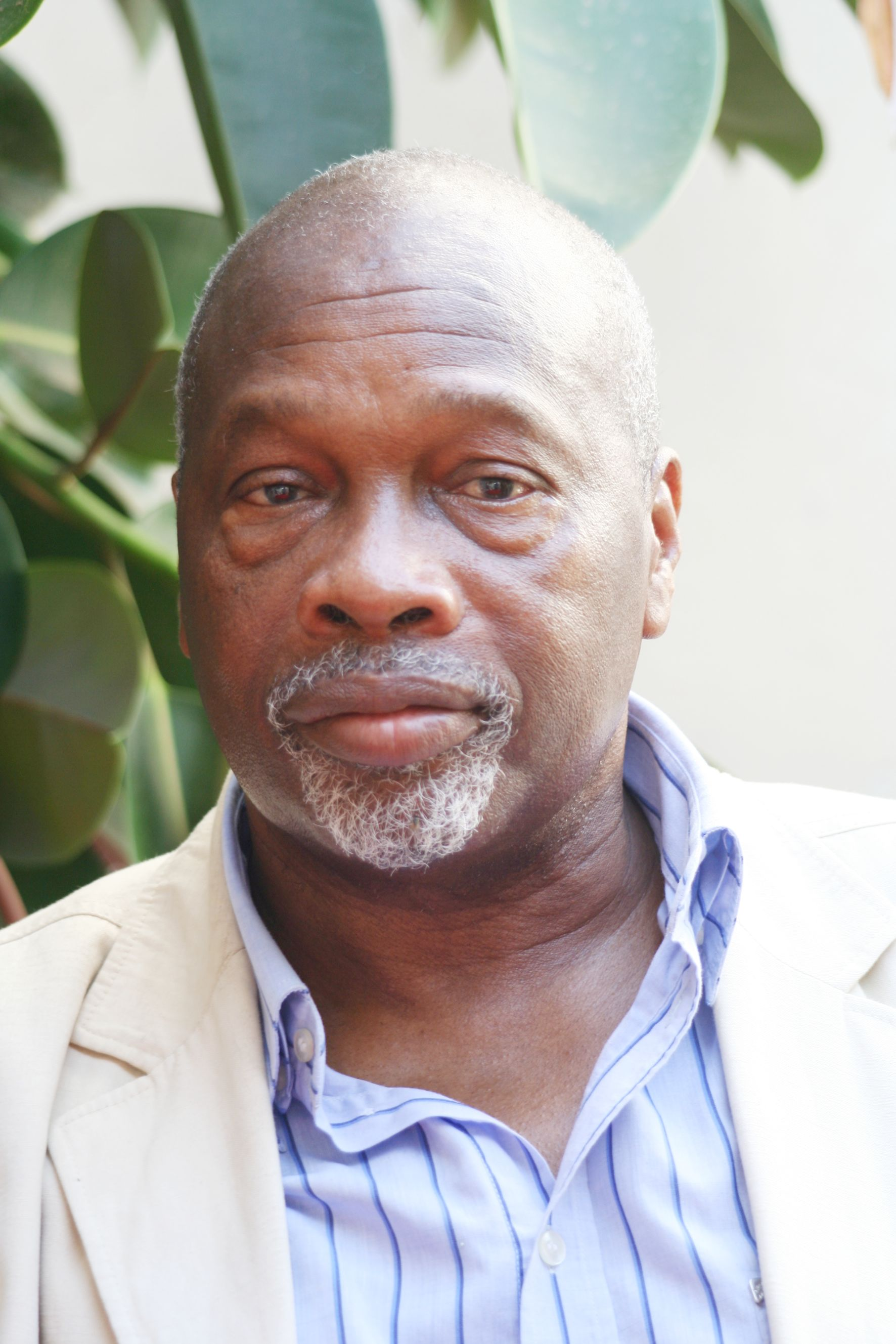
Amath Dansokho

Amath Dansokho (January 13, 1937 – August 23, 2019) was a Senegalese politician. He was Secretary-General of the Party of Independence and Work (PIT) for years; he also served in the government of Senegal as Minister of Urban Planning and Housing from 1991 to 1995 and again, briefly, in 2000. He was mayor of Kédougou for a time. Since 2012, he was a special adviser to the president of Senegal; he was also honorary president of the PIT.

== Political career ==
Dansokho was born in Kédougou. He was a member of the African Independence Party from 1957 to 1959 and lived in exile from 1960 to 1977. In 1983 he was first elected to the National Assembly as a PIT candidate, and he became Secretary-General of the PIT in 1984, following the death of Seydou Cissokho. He was re-elected to the National Assembly as a PIT candidate in 1988.

From April 1991 to September 1995, Dansokho served in the government as Minister of Urban Planning and Housing; he was re-elected to the National Assembly in 1993 and 1998. Subsequently, he supported opposition candidate Abdoulaye Wade in the 2000 presidential election, and after Wade's victory he was named Minister of Urban Planning and Housing in the new government formed in April 2000. However, he became critical of Wade and was dismissed from the government in November 2000, becoming the first of Wade's leftist allies from the 2000 election to be jettisoned.

As a candidate on his party's national list, Dansokho was the only PIT candidate to be elected to the National Assembly in the April 2001 parliamentary election. He also served as the Eighth Vice-President of the National Assembly during the parliamentary term that followed the election.

Speaking in 2002, Dansokho said that Wade was too arrogant and that his relations with other African leaders were lacking due to that characteristic; he also said that "if [Wade] had become president of Senegal in the 1960s, he would have proclaimed himself emperor."

The PIT joined the Coalition Alternative 2007 for the 2007 presidential and parliamentary elections. In December 2006, Moustapha Niasse was designated as the coalition's candidate in the February 2007 presidential election and Dansokho was designated to head the coalition's list in the parliamentary election, which was later scheduled to be held in June 2007. After the presidential election, in which Wade was re-elected, Wade mentioned Dansokho as one of several opposition politicians who would be facing prosecution for corruption. Dansokho was accused of selling lands around the international airport while he was Minister of Urban Planning and of embezzling 17 million CFA francs as mayor of Kédougou. He dismissed these charges, calling Wade a coward. Dansokho, acting as spokesman for 12 opposition parties, announced a boycott of the parliamentary election on April 2, 2007, and as a result of this the PIT did not participate in the election.

Dansokho was not included on the municipal candidate list of the Benno Siggil Senegaal opposition coalition for Kédougou in the March 2009 local elections. According to Dansokho, he had already told the PIT Secretariat that he did not want to be mayor again due to poor health, but he still felt able to serve as a municipal councillor; nevertheless, he was not included on the opposition's municipal list. Dansokho said that he was excluded from the candidate list because he was known to be averse to corruption. He remained a regional councillor.

Dansokho and the PIT supported Macky Sall against President Wade in the February–March 2012 presidential election. Sall defeated Wade, and after taking office he appointed Dansokho as Special Adviser to the President, with the rank of Minister of State, in April 2012. Speaking at the PIT's sixth congress in July 2016, Dansokho, as Honorary President of the PIT, reaffirmed the party's support for Sall, "as long as he remains on the right track".
