= Socialist Movement of the Senegalese Union =

Political group in Senegal

- Founded: 1956
- Split from: French Section of the Workers' International
- Ideology: Democratic socialism

The Socialist Movement of the Senegalese Union (French: Mouvement Socialiste d'Union Sénégalaise, MSUS) was a splinter group of French Section of the Workers' International (SFIO) in Senegal. MSUS appeared in 1956 and merged into the Senegalese Popular Bloc (BPS).
