= Tunis-Socialiste =

Defunct socialist newspaper in Tunisia

- Cover of Tunis-Socialiste, 6 November 1947 issue
- Type: Daily newspaper
- Publisher: Tunisian Federation of SFIO
- Founded: 1921
- Political alignment: Socialist
- Language: French language
- Ceased publication: 1956
- Headquarters: Tunis

Tunis-Socialiste was a French language daily evening newspaper published in Tunis, Tunisia. It was the organ of Tunisian Federation of the SFIO. The newspaper was founded in March 1921 after the communists had split away from the SFIO and taken the publication l'Avenir sociale with them. Tunis-Socialiste carried the byline "for the brotherhood of the races". The initial editorial team of the paper consisted of Albert Cattan, André Duran-Angliviel, Joachim Durel and the Fichet couple. The paper ceased publication in 1956.
