= Senegalese Party of Socialist Action =

Political party in Senegal

- Leader: Lamine Guèye
- Founded: 1957
- Dissolved: 1958
- Merged into: Senegalese Progressive Union
- Ideology: Socialism; African socialism African nationalism Pan-Africanism
- Political position: Left-wing

Senegalese Party of Socialist Action (in French: Parti Sénégalais de l'Action Socialiste) was a political party in Senegal led by Lamine Guèye. PSAS was formed as the Senegalese section of the African Socialist Movement (MSA) in 1957, following the breakaway from the French Section of the Workers' International (SFIO).

In February 1957 PSAS absorbed the African Democratic Rally of Abbas Gueye.

Following the merger of the African Convention and MSA in 1958, PSAS merged with the Senegalese Popular Bloc (Senegalese section of the Convention) to form the Senegalese Progressive Union (UPS).

== Sources ==
1. Zuccarelli, François. La vie politique sénégalaise (1940-1988). Paris: CHEAM, 1988.
