= Party of Independence and Labour =

Political party in Senegal

Party of Independence and Labour Parti de l'Indépendance et du Travail
- Abbreviation: PIT
- Leader: Maguette Thiam
- Founded: 9 July 1981
- Preceded by: African Independence Party
- Headquarters: Dakar
- Ideology: Socialism; Formerly: Communism; Marxism-Leninism
- Political position: Left-wing; Formerly: Far-left
- National affiliation: Jàmm ak Njariñ

The Party of Independence and Labour (French: Parti de l'Indépendance et du Travail, PIT) is a socialist and formerly communist political party in Senegal. For years it was led by Amath Dansokho.

== History ==
PIT emerged from the Senegalese branch of the African Independence Party (PAI). At the time of the 1960 local elections, PAI was accused by the government of fomenting unrest following a series of incidents in Saint-Louis. PAI was banned and went underground. The general secretary, Majhmoud Diop, and Tidiane Baïdy Ly went into exile in Guinea.

In 1963 at the 23rd plenary session of the Central Committee of PAI a group of party cadres, including Babacar Niang and Tidiane Baïdy Ly, were expelled from the party, accused of "anti-party fractional activity, right-wing opportunist tendencies" (Momsarew, April 1964).

In the December 1, 1963 elections PAI joined the Senegalese Democracy and Unity bloc.

Whereas many young cadres of the clandestine PAI went to study at the Patrice Lumumba University in Moscow, one section were sent to Cuba to receive training in guerrilla warfare. A group of 25 PAI guerillas entered eastern Senegal in 1965 trying to launch armed struggle against the government. The guerillas were, however, soon overrun captured and imprisoned.

In 1965 PAI split, when Landing Savané left to form the pro-Chinese Senegalese Communist Party. This split led to the dismantling of the Dakar cell of PAI.

In 1966 Seydou Cissokho took over as general secretary. In 1967 a rectification campaign was initiated, strengthening the position of Cissokho.

During the period 1965-1968 PAI had a low profile. It worked in the Syndicat des Enseignants du Sénégal and the Association of Senegalese Workers in France (ATSF).

At the 1972 congress Majhmoud Diop, the former general secretary, was expelled. The party was now completely in the hands of Cissokho.

1972 to 1975 was in many ways a period of reconstruction of PAI. Its main publication, Momsarev, started appearing somewhat regularly. PAI went on to organize a students' movement, Students Movement of the African Independence Party (MEPAI). This would later evolve into the General Union of Senegalese Students, Pupils and Probationary Teachers in Europe in 1975. This student movement would however rapidly split away from the party, and form the more radical Democratic League.

In 1976 Majhmoud Diop and his followers regrouped. Effectively two separate parties worked with the name PAI, PAI-Sénégal (led by Cissokho, technically the original PAI) and PAI-Rénovation (led by Diop).

Soon PAI-Rénovation was accorded recognition by the state to the name PAI. In 1977 PAI-Sénégal appealed to the president to substitute PAI-Rénovation for itself as the legal left.

PAI-Sénégal called for a boycott of the 1978 elections.

In 1979 PIT formed a new youth wing, Democratic Youth Union Alboury Ndiaye (Union de la Jeunesse Démocratique Alboury Ndiaye).

PAI-Sénégal later registered itself with the authorities as PIT on July 9, 1981.

In March 1999, the PIT and two other left-wing parties, And-Jëf/African Party for Democracy and Socialism (AJ/PADS) and the Democratic League/Movement for the Labour Party (LD/MPT), agreed to support the candidacy of opposition leader Abdoulaye Wade of the Senegalese Democratic Party (PDS) in the 2000 presidential election. After Wade's victory, the PIT joined the new government. Differences between Wade and PIT soon surged, and eight months after the installment of the new government the PIT was expelled. PIT joined the opposition ranks and formed part of the CDC opposition coalition.

In the parliamentary election held on 29 April 2001, the party won 0.6% of the popular vote and 1 out of 120 seats.

For the 2007 presidential and parliamentary elections, PIT joined the Coalition Alternative 2007. The coalition backed Moustapha Niasse in the February 2007 presidential election, and Dansokho was chosen to head the coalition's list in the 2007 parliamentary election. Subsequently, however, most of the opposition, including the PIT, decided to boycott the parliamentary election.

PIT publishes Daan Doole (The Worker) and Gestu.
