= Victor Biaka Boda =

Ivorian politician (1913 – 1950)

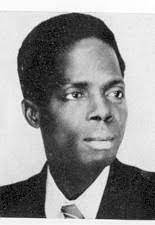
Victor Biaka Boda

Victor Biaka Boda (February 25, 1913 – January 28, 1950) was an Ivorian politician. Originally a shaman, he adopted the name Victor and ventured into politics as a member of the Democratic Party of Côte d'Ivoire - African Democratic Rally, and in 1948 was elected to the French Senate.

He is best known for the unusual circumstances of his death. His death took place at the end of a year of severe repression of his political party in the colony. In January 1950, while touring Bouaflé, his car broke down. As his chauffeur repaired it, he walked off into the jungle, never to return. His charred bones were recovered the following November. Time magazine reported in July 1951 that the most popular belief among French politicians was that "the Senator had been eaten by his constituents."

Stade Victor Biaka Boda, a stadium in Gagnoa, and École Biaka Boda, an elementary school in Bouaflé, are named in his honor.
