= L'A. O. F. =

L'A. O. F. (L'A.O.F.: echo de la côte occidentale d'Afrique: journal hebdomadaire d'informations) was a weekly newspaper published from Dakar, Senegal. L'A. O. F. was politically aligned with the French Section of the Workers' International. The paper existed between 1907 and 1958.
