= Khalilou Sall =

Senegalese politician and engineer (1926–2008)

- Born: October 3, 1926; Saint-Louis
- Occupations: Politician, Engineer

Khalilou Sall (Saint Louis, October 3, 1926-Dakar, April 16, 2008) was a Senegalese politician and engineer. He was one of the founders of the PAI.

== Life ==
He studied at the Lycée Pierre-de-Fermat in Toulouse and at the ESME-Sudria in Paris, and he worked as an engineer in France, he came back to Senegal in 1957.

Due to disagreements with Sékou Touré, he moved to Bamako, Mali in 1962. He came back in 1963.

In 1968, president Léopold Sédar Senghor put him in charge of a Senegalese railway project and he worked for the African Development Bank (1971-1977)

== Bibliography ==
- Amadou Booker Washington Sadji, Le rôle de la génération charnière ouest-africaine : indépendance et développement, L’Harmattan, 2006
- Majhemout Diop, Mémoires de luttes : textes pour servir à l’histoire du Parti africain de l’indépendance, Présence africaine, 2007
- Flux, Revue des ingénieurs Supelec, 2009
