= Popular Front (Senegal) =

Political alliance in Senegal

- Founded: 1936; 90 years ago

Ahead of the 1936 elections to the French National Assembly, a Popular Front committee was formed in Senegal. It consisted of the local branch of French Section of the Workers' International (SFIO), the Senegalese Socialist Party, the local Communist cell, the Human Rights League, and the local branch of the Radical and Radical Socialist Party led by François Carpot. The committee supported the candidature of Lamine Guèye.
