= Louis Dubreuilh =

French Politician

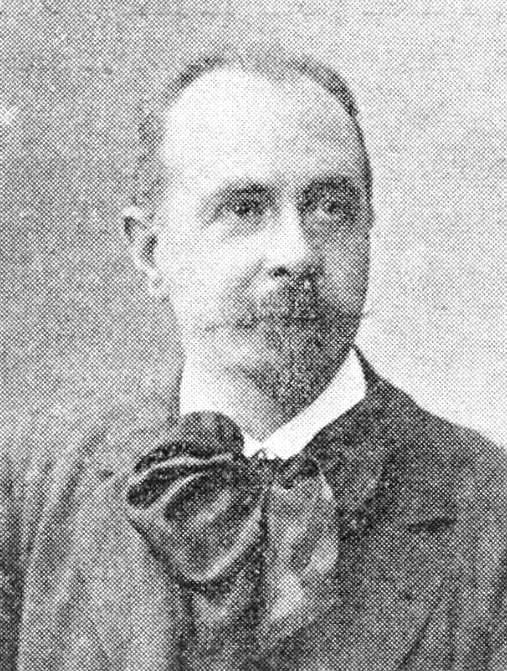

Secretary-General of the SFIO
- In office 25 April 1905 – 29 July 1918
- Preceded by: Position established
- Succeeded by: Ludovic-Oscar Frossard

Personal details
- Born: 18 March 1862 Ribérac, Dordogne, Second French Empire
- Died: 24 July 1924 (aged 62) Neuilly-sur-Marne, Seine-Saint-Denis, French Third Republic
- Party: SFIO

Louis Dubreuilh (18 March 1862 – 24 July 1924) was a French socialist politician and first Secretary-General of the French Socialist Party (SFIO) from its establishment in 1905 to 1918.

== Political career ==
Dubreuilh began his political career as a journalist initially in the Bordeaux press. As he was a socialist he had campaigned alongside Édouard Vaillant and was one of the organizers of the 1899 First General Congress of French Socialist Organizations. He was made the Secretary-General of the SFIO when it was founded in 1905 and would remain in the position until 1918. He later joined the Sacred Union movement, a response to WW1 agreeing not to go on any strikes or oppose the government for the duration of the war. Before the war ended he was succeeded as Secretary-General by Ludovic-Oscar Frossard He died in 1924.
