= Abbas Gueye =

Senegalese politician and trade-unionist

Abbas Guèye (born December 27, 1913, in Dakar, Senegal, and died August 2, 1999, in Dakar) was a politician and trade-unionist from Senegal who served in the French National Assembly from 1951 to 1955. Abbas Guèye was not related to Lamine Guèye (1891–1968), nor of the same political opinion.
