= Senegalese Socialist Party =

Left-wing political party in Senegal during the 1930s

- Leader: Lamine Guèye
- Founded: 1934
- Split from: French Section of the Workers' International
- Ideology: Democratic socialism
- National affiliation: Popular Front

The Senegalese Socialist Party (French: Parti Socialiste Sénégalais) was a political party in Senegal (at the time part of French West Africa). PSS was founded in July 1934 by Lamine Guèye, as a split from the French Section of the Workers' International (SFIO). Guèye was the party president, Armand Angrand (former mayor of Dakar) general secretary and Maître Vidal, Charles Graziani and Amadou Assane Ndoye vice-presidents.

The first congress of PSS was held on June 30, 1935, and the second November 24 the same year.

PSS published Clartés.

In 1936, PSS joined the Popular Front. Ahead of the elections PSS formed its own combat groups, to protect their meetings.

In 1937, a joint list of SFIO and PSS won the municipal elections in Saint-Louis. Maître Vidal became mayor.

The congress of PSS held June 4–5, 1938, decided to merge the party with SFIO. Following that decision, a June 11–12 congress of the new federation of SFIO was held in Thiès.

== Sources ==
- Zuccarelli, François. La vie politique sénégalaise (1789–1940). Paris: Cheam 1988.
