= Democratic Bloc of Diambour =

Political party in Senegal

Democratic Bloc of Diambour (French: Bloc Démocratique du Diambour, or Ndiambour) was a political party in Diambour, Senegal.

It was one of a number of Senegalese political groups that emerged in the 1940s and 1950s, prior to Senegalese independence. BDD merged into the Senegalese Party of Socialist Action.
