= Possibilism =

Possibilism, possibilist or possibilistic may refer to:

- Possibilism (geography), a theory of cultural geography
- Possibilism (politics), an 1880s faction of the Federation of the Socialist Workers of France
- Possibilism (philosophy), the metaphysical belief that possible things exist (with modal realism being one strong version of possibilism)
- Possibility theory, a framework for reasoning with uncertainty in artificial intelligence
- Possibilism, a somewhat derogatory term for reformist socialism
- Libertarian possibilism, an anarchist current that advocates participation in political institutions

== See also ==
- Possibilianism
