= List for the Defence of the Interests of Commune of Linguère =

Senegalese political party

List for the Defence of the Interests of Commune of Linguère (in French: List pour la défense des intérêts de la commune de Linguère) was a political party in Linguère, Senegal. It existed around 1960.
