= Movement of Leftwing Radicals =

Political party in Senegal

Movement of Leftwing Radicals (French: Mouvement des Radicaux de Gauche) is a political party in Senegal. The general secretary of the party is Mamadou Bana Wagne. The party was registered on March 16, 2004.
