= Independent Party of Sine Saloum =

Political party in Senegal

Independent Party of Sine Saloum (French: Parti indépendant du Sine Saloum) was a political party in Sine-Saloum, Senegal. It existed around 1960.

== Sources ==
- Nzouankeu, Jacques Mariel. Les partis politiques sénégalais. Dakar: Editions Clairafrique, 1984.
