= Martin Aku =

Togolese politician (1913–1970)

- Born: 2 September 1913; Lomé, Togo
- Died: 17 June 1970 (aged 56); Lomé, Togo

Martin Aku (2 September 1913 in Lomé, Togo – 17 June 1970 in Lomé) was a Togolese politician who served in the French National Assembly from 1946–1951.
