= Democratic League/Movement for the Labour Party =

Political party in Senegal

- Abbreviation: LD/MPT, LD
- Founded: 1970s
- Preceded by: African Independence Party
- Ideology: Socialism; Formerly: Communism; Marxism-Leninism
- Political position: Left-wing
- National affiliation: Jàmm ak Njariñ

The Democratic League/Movement for the Labour Party (Ligue Démocratique/Mouvement pour le Parti du Travail) is a political party in Senegal.

== History ==
The congress of the General Union of Senegalese Students Probationary Teachers in Europe held in April 1975 provoked a split on behalf of the students of PAI. The students, who went on to form LD, wanted a more radical Marxist-Leninist party.

Beginning in 1978 one tendency led by Moussa Kane made contact with the PAI of Majhmout Diop. On March 29 Kane and his followers joined the legal PAI.

LD founded the monthly magazine Vérité.

LD was recognized as a legal political party on July 9, 1981. After legalization it started publishing Fagaru.

In the late 1970s, LD started advocating the unification of the Marxist left in Senegal into a single party (they proposed the name Parti Sénégalais du Travail). Thus it later changed its name to LD/MPT.

The LD/MDT won three seats in the 1993 parliamentary election and joined the Socialist Party-led government in June 1993, during the presidency of Abdou Diouf. The party held two positions in the government. It left the government following the May 1998 parliamentary election, in which it again won three seats. In March 1999, the LD/MPT and two other left-wing parties, And-Jëf/African Party for Democracy and Socialism (AJ/PADS) and the Party of Independence and Labour (PIT), agreed to support the candidacy of opposition leader Abdoulaye Wade of the Senegalese Democratic Party (PDS) in the 2000 presidential election. Wade was victorious in the second round of the 2000 election, and the LD/MPT then joined the first government under Wade, holding two ministries: LD/MPT Secretary-General Abdoulaye Bathily became Minister of Energy and Hydraulics and Yéro Dé became Minister of the Civil Service, Employment and Labor.

In the 2001 parliamentary election, the LD/MPT was part of the ruling Sopi Coalition (also including the PDS). The LD/MPT won seven seats in the National Assembly.

The two LD/MPT ministers in the government, Yéro Deh and Seydou Sy Sall (who was Minister of Town Planning and Regional Planning), were dismissed by Wade on March 9, 2005. The party had become highly critical of Wade and the government, and it was accused of violating "governmental solidarity by constant, unjust and unfounded attacks against the president, his government and his party". An important factor in this was the opposition of the LD/MPT to an amnesty regarding the 1993 assassination of Constitutional Council vice-president Babacar Sèye. Prior to the dismissal of its ministers, the LD/MPT had already intended to leave the government on April 24.

The party no longer identifies itself as a communist party.

The youth wing of LD/MPT is known as Democratic Youth Movement (MDJ).
