= National Movement of Servants of the Masses =

Political party in Senegal

- Leader: Aliou Seck
- Founded: 12th of March 1998

National Movement of Servants of the Masses (French: Mouvement national des serviteurs des masses) is a political party in Senegal, founded on March 12, 1998, in Diourbel. The party is led by Aliou Seck.
