= Party for the Defence of the Interests of Kolda =

Political party in Senegal

Party for the Defence of the Interests of Kolda (in French: Parti de la défense des intérêts de Kolda) was a political party in Kolda, Senegal. It existed around 1960.

== Sources ==
1. Nzouakeu, Jacques Mariel. Les parties politiques sénégalais. Dakar: Editions Clairafrique, 1984.
