= Gilles Sunu =

Togolese-French footballer (born 1991)

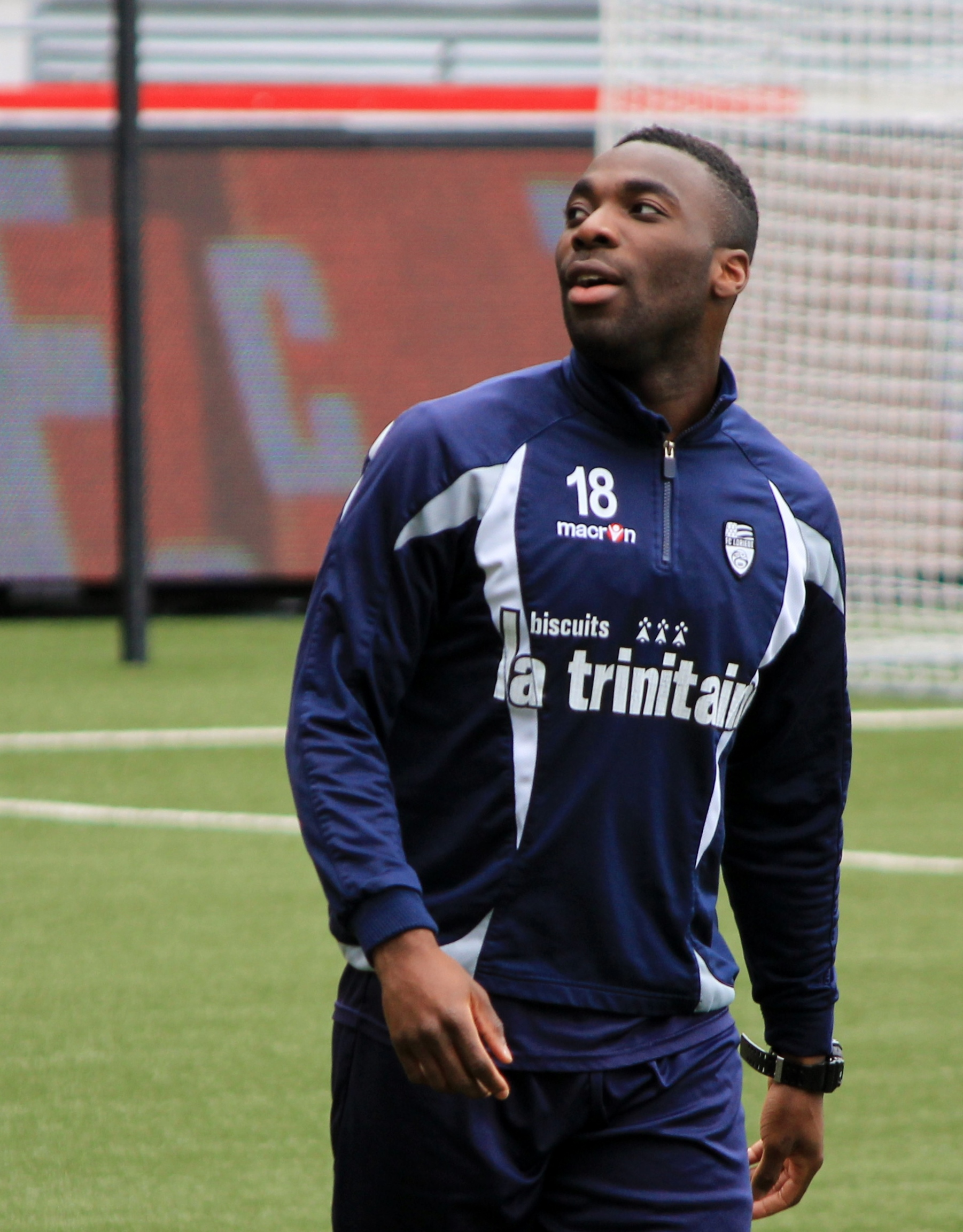
- Sunu with Lorient in 2013

Personal information
- Full name: Gilles-Christ Manu Sunu
- Date of birth: 30 March 1991 (age 35)
- Place of birth: Châteauroux, France
- Height: 1.81 m (5 ft 11 in)
- Position: Winger

Youth career
- 1997–2007: Châteauroux
- 2007–2009: Arsenal

Senior career*
Years	Team	Apps	(Gls)
2009–2011	Arsenal	0	(0)
2009–2010	→ Derby County (loan)	9	(1)
2010–2011	→ Lorient (loan)	9	(0)
2011	→ Lorient B (loan)	4	(0)
2011–2015	Lorient	67	(6)
2012–2014	Lorient B	10	(3)
2015	Évian	10	(3)
2015–2018	Angers	75	(3)
2018–2019	BB Erzurumspor	34	(4)
2020–2023	Châteauroux	68	(3)
2022–2023	Châteauroux B	8	(1)

International career^{‡}
2007–2008	France U17	7	(1)
2008–2009	France U18	8	(2)
2009–2010	France U19	16	(2)
2010–2011	France U20	14	(4)
2011	France U21	6	(0)
2018–	Togo	13	(2)
Medal record
Men's football
Representing France
UEFA European Under-17 Championship
Runner-up	2008
- * Club domestic league appearances and goals as of 26 May 2023 ‡ National team caps and goals as of 10 September 2024

Gilles-Christ Manu Sunu (born 30 March 1991) is a professional footballer who plays as a winger. He has featured for clubs such as Arsenal, Derby County, Lorient, Évian, and Angers. Born in France, Sunu represents Togo internationally.

== Club career ==
Sunu was born in Châteauroux, Indre. He began his career at the LB Châteauroux academy, but moved to Arsenal in July 2007 on a four-year contract for a fee between £700,000 and £1 million. At Arsenal whilst playing for the club's academy, Sunu won the FA Youth Cup of 2009 beating Liverpool by 6–2 on aggregate in both legs of the final. He was also victorious in winning the Premier Academy League of 2009 thus helping the club towards an historic youth double.

=== Arsenal ===
==== 2009–10 season ====
Gilles had an impressive first half of the season with Arsenal Reserves, making nine appearances and scoring four goals. He made his first team debut for the club when he started a League Cup match against West Bromwich Albion on 22 September 2009, playing 58 minutes before being substituted for Carlos Vela. On 9 December 2009, Sunu made his UEFA Champions League debut in Arsenal's 1–0 away defeat to Olympiacos, coming on for Jack Wilshere on 76 minutes.

==== Loan to Derby County ====
On 18 February 2010, Sunu signed for Derby County on loan until the end of the 2009–10 season. He made his debut for the Rams as a first-half substitute in a 1–0 defeat to Swansea City, coming on for the injured Kris Commons before being later substituted on the 85-minute. Sunu scored his first goal in a 4–1 defeat away to Reading on 10 March 2010. After Stephen Pearson and Rob Hulse worked a smart one-two on the left side of the area and when Pearson was halted by a challenge, Sunu poked the loose ball past goalkeeper Adam Federici from the edge of the area. In total, Sunu made nine appearances for Derby before returning to Arsenal slightly earlier than intended after picking up an injury in Derby's penultimate game of the season away to Bristol City.

==== 2010–11 season ====
After scoring in the final of the 2010 UEFA European Under-19 Football Championship in July, Gilles suffered a cartilage injury in his right knee that would keep him out of action for two months. Sunu made his comeback for the Arsenal Reserves against Blackpool at the end of September and went on to make eight appearances, scoring twice.

=== Lorient ===
On 31 January 2011, Sunu opted to join Lorient on loan for the remainder of the 2010–11 campaign. He made his debut for Les Merlus as a second-half substitute in the 2–0 victory over Caen. Gilles created his first assist in the 3–2 away victory to Lens. After rounding Lens goalkeeper Vedran Runje, Sunu flicked the ball back from the byline for Kevin Gameiro to head in from five yards to make the score 2–2. Gilles completed his loan at Lorient making nine appearances, all from the substitutes' bench. Sky Sports reported that Lorient manager Christian Gourcuff was keen to re-sign Sunu as well as his Arsenal teammate Francis Coquelin on an additional year's loan, with Sunu hinting that he would welcome a return to the seaport town.

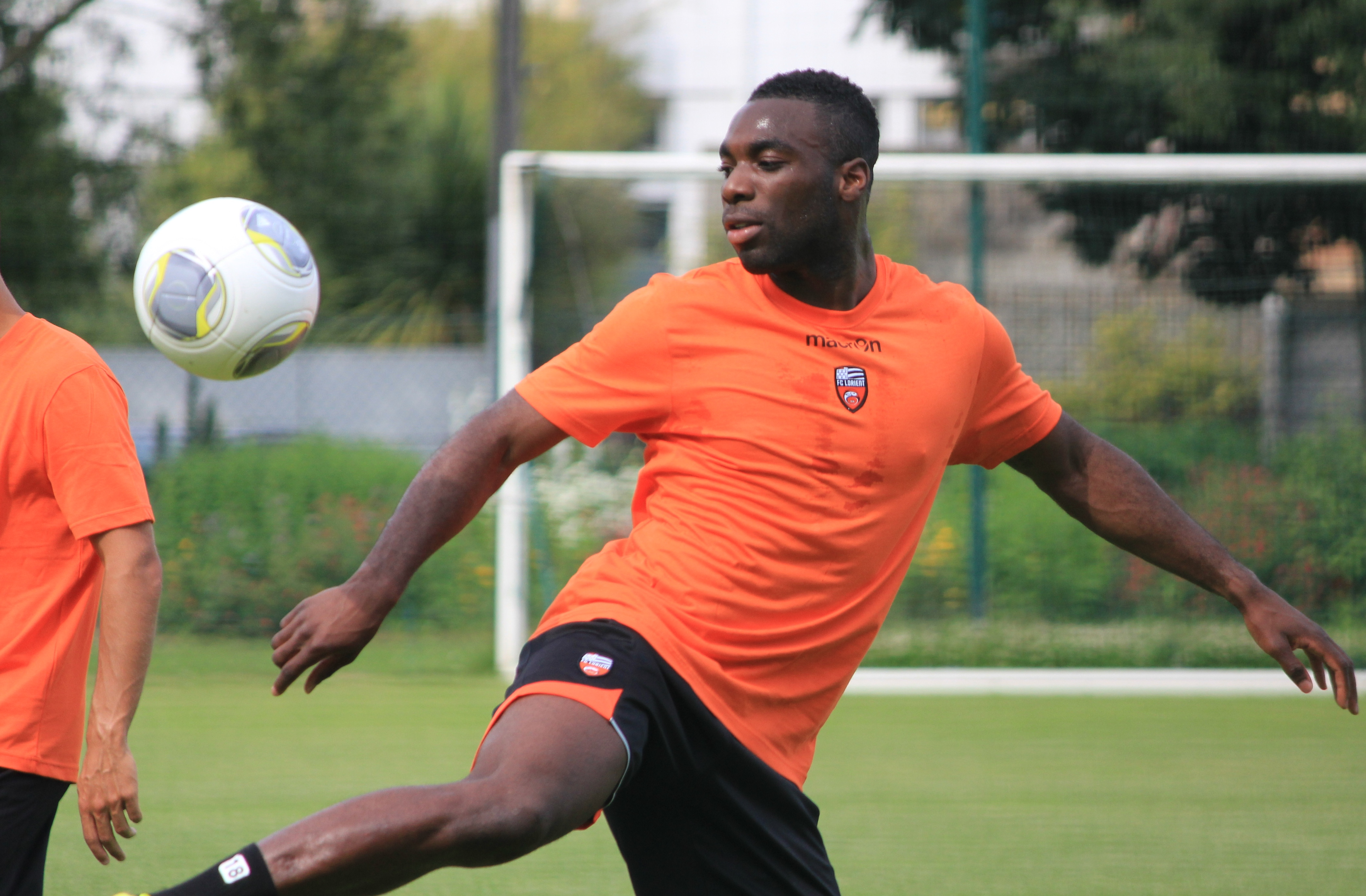
Sunu with Lorient in 2013

Gilles Sunu signed a four-year contract with Lorient on 31 August 2011, just three days after being an unused substitute in Arsenal's heavy 8–2 defeat to Manchester United. Sunu made his full debut for Lorient in the 1–1 away draw against Sochaux, coming on as a 62nd-minute substitute for Arnold Mvuemba. On 6 November 2011, Sunu scored his first goal for Lorient and made an assist in the 2–0 home win against Ajaccio. Sunu went past his man and cut the ball back for Yann Jouffre to score from outside the box. Before Jouffre turned provider and played Sunu in on goal with only the keeper to beat. Sunu scored his second goal of the season in the quarter-finals of the Coupe de la Ligue of 2012 in the 1–0 away victory to Le Mans. Gilles beat Le Mans goalkeeper Giorgi Makaridze at the near post on the 70th minute after coming on as a 62nd-minute substitute for Innocent Emeghara.

=== Évian ===
Sunu moved in January 2015 to the Parc des Sports so as to join up with that of Évian in a one-and-a-half-year deal. He in all played 10 matches for Les Roses, scoring three goals altogether.

=== Angers ===
Sunu went on to leave Evian in the summer of that year so as to link up with fellow Ligue 1 team Angers SCO.

== International career ==
Sunu is a French youth international having earned caps for the under-17s, under-18s, under-19s, under-20s and under-21s. He served as captain throughout the 2008–09 season for the under-19s. During the final of the 2010 UEFA European Under-19 Football Championship, Sunu equalised against Spain to put France on course for a 2–1 victory.

Sunu was named in France under-20's final 21-man squad that competed at the 2011 FIFA U-20 World Cup. He started all seven of France's world cup games, scoring two goals in total as France finished fourth in Colombia.

In September 2018 he switched his international allegiance to Togo, the country of his father Manu. He made his debut for the Togo national football team in a 1–1 2019 Africa Cup of Nations qualification tie with The Gambia on 12 October 2018.

== Personal life ==
Sunu is the son of former Togolese international Manu Sunu.

== Career statistics ==
=== Club ===
As of 4 July 2018

Appearances and goals by club, season and competition
Club	Season	League			National cup		League cup		Europe		Total	
Club	Season	Division	Apps	Goals	Apps	Goals	Apps	Goals	Apps	Goals	Apps	Goals
Arsenal	2009–10	Premier League	0	0	0	0	1	0	1	0	2	0
Derby County (loan)	2009–10	Championship	9	1	0	0	0	0	0	0	9	1
Lorient	2010–11	Ligue 1	9	0	0	0	0	0	0	0	9	0
Lorient	2011–12	Ligue 1	15	1	1	0	2	1	0	0	18	2
Lorient	2012–13	Ligue 1	17	3	3	0	1	1	0	0	21	4
Lorient	2013–14	Ligue 1	18	1	1	0	1	0	0	0	20	1
Lorient	2014–15	Ligue 1	17	1	1	0	0	0	0	0	18	1
Lorient	Total		76	6	6	0	4	2	0	0	86	8
Evian	2014–15	Ligue 1	10	3	0	0	0	0	0	0	10	3
Angers	2015–16	Ligue 1	32	2	2	0	1	0	0	0	35	2
Angers	2016–17	Ligue 1	23	0	3	0	1	0	0	0	27	0
Angers	2017–18	Ligue 1	20	1	1	0	2	0	0	0	23	1
Angers	Total		75	3	6	0	4	0	0	0	85	3
Career total			170	13	12	0	9	2	1	0	192	15

=== International ===
Scores and results list Togo's goal tally first.

No.	Date	Venue	Opponent	Score	Result	Competition
1.	10 September 2019	Stade de Kégué, Lomé, Togo	Comoros	2–0	2–0	2022 FIFA World Cup qualification
2.	12 October 2020	Hammadi Agrebi Stadium, Tunis, Tunisia	Sudan	1–0	1–1	Friendly

== Honours ==
Arsenal

- FA Youth Cup: 2008–09
- Premier Academy League: 2008–09

France U19

- UEFA European Under-19 Championship: 2010
