= Manu Sunu =

Togolese footballer

Personal information
- Full name: Emmanuel Sunu Songo'o
- Date of birth: 17 March 1966 (age 60)
- Place of birth: Bè, Lomé, Togo
- Height: 1.91 m (6 ft 3 in)
- Position: Attacking midfielder

Youth career
- 1983–1988: ASKO Kara

Senior career*
Years	Team	Apps	(Gls)
1988–1992	ASKO Kara	154	(10)
1992–2000	Gomido	200	(51)
Total		354	(61)

International career^{‡}
1991–1998	Togo	28	(2)
- * Club domestic league appearances and goals as of 24 January 2010 ‡ National team caps and goals as of 4 December 2010

Emmanuel Sunu Songo'o (born 17 March 1966), commonly known as Manu Sunu, is a Togolese former footballer who played as an attacking midfielder for ASKO Kara and Gomido and internationally for Togo.

Due to an injury sustained at the age of 34, Manu enjoyed a relatively short but albeit successful playing career spanning just under twelve years.

== Personal life ==
His son Gilles also became a professional football, and represents Togo internationally.
