= African Regroupment Party – Renewal =

Political party in Senegal

African Regroupment Party-Renewal (in French: Parti du Regroupement Africain-Rénovation) was a political party in Senegal, formed in 1964 following a split in the African Regroupment Party-Senegal (PRA-Sénégal). PRA-Rénovation opted for a quick merger with the Senegalese Progressive Union (UPS).

== Sources ==
- Zuccarelli, François. La vie politique sénégalaise (1940-1988). Paris: CHEAM, 1988.
