= Khonjuk =

Khonjuk خنجوك
- Village
- Location within Iran
- Coordinates: 33°37′41″N 58°58′39″E
- Country: Iran
- Province: South Khorasan
- County: Qaen
- Bakhsh: Sedeh
- Rural District: Paskuh

Population (2006)
  - Total: 237
- Time zone: UTC+3:30 (IRST)
  - Summer (DST): UTC+4:30 (IRDT)

Khonjuk (Persian: خنجوك, also Romanized as Khonjūk and Khonjūk; also known as Sūnū) is a village in Paskuh Rural District, Sedeh District, Qaen County, South Khorasan Province, Iran. At the 2006 census, its population was 237, in 65 families.
