= Democratic Front of Chad =

Political party in Chad

The Democratic Front of Chad (French: Front démocratique du Tchad or FDT) was a Chadian political party active in the 1980s.

It formed in Paris in 1985 from a coalition of four pre-existing groups in opposition to both opposition leader Goukouni Oueddei and President Hissène Habré, and was dominated by southern Chadians. It was led by the general Negue Djogo. Among its members was the future Prime Minister Jean Alingué Bawoyeu. The FDT, which boasted that it was supported by the United States and France, accused Habré's government of genocide for its massacres in the south, and it supported the Codos' insurgency.

At the end of 1985 the group participated with Alphonse Kotiga's Codos and Acheikh ibn Oumar's CAC-CDR at peace talks with Habré at Libreville in Gabon under the patronage of Omar Bongo. The talks were successful, and on December 23 Djogo signed a peace accord which sanctioned the entrance of the FDT in the government; Djogo was to become Minister of Justice, while other two party leaders were to be made minister of finance and minister of culture, youth, and sports. The accord also tried to fix a deadline for the adoption of a democratic constitution, and this party's goal was reasserted in a press conference on March 4, 1986, when Djogo stated that the FDT saw as the sole solution to Chad's crisis a return to democratic institutions. But in truth the FDT was rapidly co-opted in the sole legal party, Habré's National Union for Independence and Revolution (UNIR), of which Djogo became a member of the Central Committee in 1989.
