= Party for Progress and Citizenship =

Political party in Senegal

The Party for Progress and Citizenship (Parti pour le progrès et la citoyenneté, PPC) was a political party in Senegal from 2000 to 2002. Led by Mbaye-Jacques Diop, the PPC was formed as a split from the Socialist Party and supported President Abdoulaye Wade.

In the April 2001 parliamentary election, the party won 0.91% of the popular vote and one out of 120 seats. The party's only seat was won by Diop through national list proportional representation. The PPC merged itself into the Senegalese Democratic Party (PDS) on 20 May 2002.
