= Rassemblement Démocratique Africain =

1946–1958 political party in Africa

African Democratic Rally Rassemblement Démocratique Africain
- Founder: Félix Houphouët-Boigny
- Founded: 1946
- Dissolved: Around 1958
- Ideology: African nationalism Pan-Africanism; Anti-colonialism; Factions: African socialism

The Rassemblement Démocratique Africain, commonly known as the RDA and variously translated as African Democratic Assembly and African Democratic Rally, was a political party in French West Africa and French Equatorial Africa which was important in the decolonization of the French empire. The RDA was composed of different political parties throughout the French colonies in Africa and lasted from 1946 until 1958. At certain points, the RDA was the largest political party in the colonies in Africa and played a key role in the French government headed by the Democratic and Socialist Union of the Resistance (UDSR). Although the regional party largely dissolved in 1958 with the independence votes for the colonies, many of the national parties retained the RDA in their name and some continue to do so. The political ideology of the party did not endorse outright secession of colonies from France, but it was anti-colonial and pan-Africanist in its political stances.

The RDA was formed at a conference in Bamako, in the colony of French Sudan, in 1946. The aim of the conference was to unite African leaders affiliated with the French Socialist Party with those affiliated with the French Communist Party together to work on reconfiguring the relationship between France and the African colonies. However, the French Socialist leaders in France saw the proposal as undermining their relationships and so forced their African members to withdraw from the conference. The result was that the resulting party was exclusively supported by the Communist Party, a situation which shaped the early positions of the party and its political opportunities. The leader of the party from this first conference until the very end was Félix Houphouët-Boigny of the Ivory Coast. Because of the withdrawal of the socialists from the party, the RDA was initially in a coalition with the French Communist Party in the French National Assembly. However, this coalition alienated many RDA delegates who eventually split with the RDA and formed the rival Indépendants d'Outre-Mer (IOM) party. Continued French hostility to the RDA, a weakening of the Communist Party in France, and the defection of delegates to the IOM, resulted in the RDA ending its coalition with the communists and joining the small Democratic and Socialist Union of the Resistance (UDSR).

Following a number of years of electoral defeats and French repression of the party, the RDA returned to prominence in regional politics by performing very well in the 1956 and 1957 elections throughout the colonies. The RDA became the largest political party in French Africa and the largest group in the UDSR which allowed Houphouët-Boigny to become a prominent French minister after the 1956 elections. As minister, Houphouët-Boigny crafted the 1958 option to the colonies to vote for immediate independence or to join a community linking the colonies with France but with increased autonomy. The vote, however, divided the RDA over the issues of independence and federalism and the party largely split. Despite the breakup of the party after the 1958 vote, the national parties and the connections established regionally through the party remained important. The RDA parties in Guinea and Mali, which were the dominant parties in those countries during and after independence, joined together with the former British colony of Ghana to form the Union of African States. In contrast, the Ivory Coast, Niger and Dahomey were joined together with the Conseil de l'Entente in the era after independence.

== Political context ==
French West Africa

French Equatorial Africa

With the end of World War II, the French colonial empire set about a significant reorganization of the relationship between France and the colonies. Before the establishment of the French Fourth Republic, the only colony in French West Africa or French Equatorial Africa with any elections for political authorities was Senegal. The rest of the colonies had few Africans who were considered citizens of France, no elections, and suppression of most political movements.

With the establishment of the French Union (French: Union française) in 1946 all of the colonies of French Africa (except for the trusteeship of Togo) became overseas departments which would provide to the colonies expanded citizenship, the right to elect members to the French National Assembly, and some limited autonomy for local councils. The 1946 French elections in June largely split the legislature between a coalition of the Popular Republican Movement (French: Mouvement Républicain Populaire or MRP) the French Communist Party (French: Parti Communiste Français or PCF), and the French Section of the Workers' International (French: Section Française de l'Internationale Ouvrière or SFIO). This split meant that each party needed to court African deputies to the National Assembly in order to further their legislative causes. The SFIO was the only party with actual party branches established in the African colonies, while the Communist party had established Groupes d’Etudes Communistes (Communist Study Groups) in many of the capitals of the African colonies in 1943 and the MRP had various networks arranged by the church.

Combined with the need for African deputies by the main French political parties, many African leaders believed that the pathway to improved conditions for the colonies lay largely in working with the French government rather than leading revolutionary movements. The result was a marriage of convenience linking the French political parties with newly elected African deputies. While the SFIO had the most institutionalized linkages to African political leaders prior to 1946, many leaders felt that the assimilation pathway which the SFIO had helped write into the constitution of the Fourth Republic did not provide enough for the African colonies.

More globally, the issue of independence from colonial rule had become a prominent topic throughout Africa and Asia. Many British and UN Trusteeship colonies in Africa had begun the process towards independence in the mid-1940s. Ghana constantly served as an example giving rise to demands by political movements in French West Africa throughout the 1950s. During the same period, violent anti-colonial struggles reached significant levels in many other French colonies: including the Malagasy Uprising in Madagascar and violence in the First Indochina War in Vietnam.

== Formation: 1946 ==
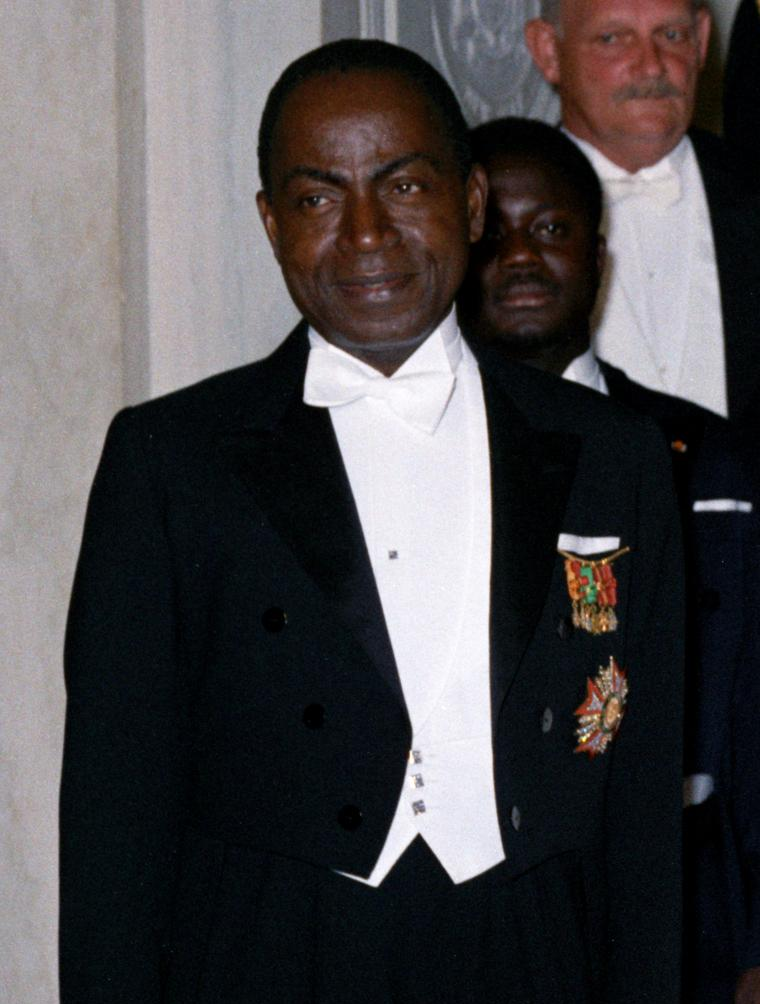
Félix Houphouët-Boigny of Ivory Coast was the political leader of RDA for much of its existence.

Party Acronyms
BDS	Senegalese Democratic Bloc
CA	African Convention
IOM	Indépendants d'Outre-Mer
MRP	Popular Republican Movement
PCF	French Communist Party
PRA	African Regroupment Party
SFIO	French Section of the Workers' International
UDSR	Democratic and Socialist Union of the Resistance

Within the context of a realignment between France and the colonies, one of the elected deputies pushing most significantly for increased autonomy of the colonies was Félix Houphouët-Boigny of the Ivory Coast colony. Houphouët-Boigny had spent a brief period as a delegate in the French National Assembly, where he had aligned most closely with the French Communist Party and had taken an active role in trying to get the recall of André-Jean-Gaston Latrille, the French governor of the Ivory Coast. Following the collapse of the National Assembly elected in July 1946 and wanting to establish a pan-African party in the National Assembly, Houphouët-Boigny convinced Lamine Guèye of Senegal (who was the most prominent socialist in Africa at the time) to work towards establishing a wider political movement with the goal of autonomy for the colonies of Africa. These two leaders then brought together many of the other African delegates in the National Assembly to sign a manifesto calling for all leaders to come to Bamako (today the capital of Mali) for a meeting to establish a regional political party. In addition to Houphouët-Boigny and Guèye, the leaders who signed this manifesto were: Jean-Félix Tchicaya from French Congo, Sourou-Migan Apithy from French Dahomey, Fily Dabo Sissoko from French Sudan, Yacine Diallo from Guinea, and Gabriel d'Arboussier from Senegal. Although he did not sign it at the time of its composition, Léopold Sédar Senghor from Senegal openly endorsed the contents of the letter.

The congress was held from 18 to 21 October 1946. However, the start of the conference was undermined as a result of French Socialist opposition and conflict between some of the members. The Communist party offered full support to the meeting, which only led the other parties to approach the meeting with suspicion. Most importantly the Socialist Minister of colonial affairs, Marius Moutet, viewed the meeting as a threat to his colonial policies and thus instructed his allies not to attend and for colonial authorities to do what they could to hinder the meeting. Moutet convinced some of the signatories of the document to renounce the manifesto and persuaded Guèye, Senghor, and Diallo not to attend. In addition, the colonial authorities confiscated Tchicaya's funds for travel. The result was that the 800 delegates who did arrive included few socialist moderates and instead was dominated by those who sought to align the party with the communists. Reflecting on the way this shaped the party, Houphouët-Boigny recalled in 1952 that "If Lamine and Senghor had been at Bamako, we would have written another page of history."

The conference also got off to a rocky start as a result of the different factions in the French Sudan colony which was hosting the conference. When Houphouët-Boigny, Apithy, and d'Arboussier arrived on the morning of 18 October at the airport in Bamako (in a plane which was formerly the private plane of Hermann Göring and was provided by the communist party) they were greeted by a hostile Sissoko, worried the party would give support to other French Sudanese political leaders and weaken his leadership. Sissoko, as the host of the conference, refused to open up the discussion. Eventually pressure from within his own political party and from the leaders assembled led him to agree to open the meeting at 4:00 PM (although he insisted on calling it "your congress" and not "our congress" throughout his opening speech).

The conference agreed to a few different issues. First, they agreed to form a regional political alliance among many of their different movements. Rather than a regional party which would have a significant regional infrastructure, the members viewed it as an alliance of the different political forces operating in each of the colonies. Thus they created a Committee of Coordination to be tasked with selecting which party in each colony would be the representative of the RDA party and named Houphouët-Boigny as chairman and Sissoko, Apithy, Tchicaya, d'Arboussier, and Mamadou Konate (the key Malian politician who convinced Sissoko to join the meeting) as vice-chairmen. Second, as the parties' main activity would be in the National Assembly, there were active discussions about what coalitions to form with French political parties. The debate largely focused on whether to form a permanent coalition with the Communist party or to align with them while they served RDA interests. The group agreed to compromise language that the party would form coalitions with whichever party was most useful for African issues. Third, although it was briefly mentioned, the conference agreed not to call for complete independence of the colonies, but instead for an end to the unequal colonial relationship with France. Although the party was to be anti-colonial and focus on increased autonomy for the French colonies, they were not advocating secession or withdrawal from France as an immediate goal.

== Divisions: 1947–49 ==
Although they only had a month to organize for the French legislative elections in November 1946, they were able to secure a number of seats by using the political organizations established by the various members. The National Assembly votes in France once again supported the three party center-left coalition of the MRP (29% of the vote), the PCF (28.6% of the vote) and the SFIO (16.5% of the vote). In French West Africa and French Equatorial Africa, the RDA was able to win 10 seats for the National Assembly: with members being Houphouët-Boigny, Daniel Ouezzin Coulibaly, and Zinda Kaboré from the Ivory Coast (which included the Upper Volta at this point), Apithy represented Dahomey (present-day Benin), Tchicaya represented the Middle Congo (present-day Republic of the Congo), Konate represented French Sudan, Hamani Diori represented Niger, Gabriel Lisette represented Chad, Martin Aku from Togo, and Mamba Sano from Guinea. The Socialists won six seats with continued support in Senegal (where Guèye and Senghor were both elected to positions) and from other longtime supporters like Sissoko and an associate from the French Sudan, who had left the RDA right after the meeting, and Diallo from Guinea. Because the second college of the National Assembly was not directly elected, the Socialist party was able to use political strategies to secure 12 of the 20 seats from West and Equatorial Africa in the 1947 election (including making Moutet himself a representative from the French Sudan).

When the RDA members arrived in Paris, they were provided significant support and advice from the Communist party (and particularly Aimé Césaire from Martinique) which relied significantly on their voting block. This bond was further strengthened when the coalition government named Popular Republican Movement politician Paul Coste-Floret as the Ministre de la France d'Outre-mer governing the colonies. Coste-Floret began an era of very rigid policy towards the colonies and particularly towards movements perceived to be pushing for independence. However, two changes served to exacerbate divisions within the membership of the RDA. First, in May 1947 the coalition between the MRP, the SFIO, and the Communists had dissolved. This dissolution coincides with American financing of Europe, including France, in the post-World War II period. The United States warned European nations that they would not receive financial support to reconstruct their nations if communist parties were a part of their ruling governmental bodies. This introduced significant differences between the parties which had before been set aside and meant that the Communists saw decreasing power to offer their RDA allies. Second, the French divided the Upper Volta from the Ivory Coast in order to try and reduce the power of Houphouët-Boigny and the RDA. The plan appeared to work when in 1948, Zinda Kaboré was killed and the Mossi chiefs in Upper Volta, who had renounced the RDA and connected with the MRP, were able to appoint Nazi Boni to fill the position.

These two factors combined to make many of the National Assembly delegates, particularly those with large Catholic constituencies in their colonies, feel uneasy about the coalition with the Communist party. Apithy, from Dahomey, in particular raised the issue many times and when his efforts to end the coalition failed, he formed a new regional political party in September 1948, the Indépendants d'Outre-Mer (IOM). The IOM included Apithy, the three new members from the Upper Volta, and three other members from throughout West and Equatorial Africa. The formation of the IOM coincided precisely with the naming of a new Prime Minister, Robert Schuman, to present his cabinet in what would be a very close vote. During the debate on this cabinet, Apithy presented Schuman with a number of questions regarding the future of the colonial arrangement. When Schuman gave the closing speech before a vote to confirm his cabinet, Apithy's questions were the only ones which he did not address at all. Apithy was infuriated by this perceived slight and so cast the whole seven votes of the IOM (including those of the three absent Upper Volta members) against the cabinet. Schuman lost by six votes and was replaced by Radical Party politician Henri Queuille. Queille made a point of meeting with Apithy before the presentation of his cabinet and answered all of his questions in his first speech to the National Assembly.

In 1948, the IOM increased its membership in the French National Assembly by adding members from the RDA, the Socialist block, and MRP politicians. However, the IOM also saw a change in leadership as Apithy was replaced with Louis-Paul Aujoulat as a result of dissatisfaction by the Upper Volta members who wanted their votes cast to support the MRP government of Schuman. These changes brought the IOM closer to the MRP while the RDA remained tied to the Communist party. The antagonisms between the French parties resulted in antagonism between their African allies. The rise of the IOM meant that the RDA no longer had party affiliates and any significant presence in Togo or French Dahomey, and weakened colony affiliates elsewhere. At the same time that the IOM was increasing in strength, the Socialist party in Senegal saw a split between Guèye and Senghor with the later creating a new party, the Senegalese Democratic Bloc (French: Bloc Démocratique Sénégalais, BDS), which he aligned with the IOM movement. This split made the alignment of parties in the National Assembly much more complex and allowed options for new groupings between the different factions.

By 1948, the RDA had active parties as a primary faction in six of the colonies of French Africa: Ivory Coast, Middle Congo, Ubangi-Shari, Chad, Guinea, and in French Sudan. At the same time, it was actively suppressed in Upper Volta and French Sudan by the opposition parties.

In response to these shifting political environments, the RDA held its second party congress in January 1949 in Treichville, Ivory Coast. The congress appointed Houphouët-Boigny as the President of the party and named d'Arboussier as the General Secretary. The main issue for debate was the alliance with the Communists in France with d'Arboussier arguing that the alliance was necessary but a number of other members questioning the alliance. However the issue was not resolved at the second party congress.

== Chaos in the Ivory Coast: 1949 ==
Unlike other parts of the French empire (notably Madagascar and Indochina), independence movements in French Africa had remained largely peaceful. This changed in 1949 when French authorities used divisions between Houphouët-Boigny and other politicians to begin active and violent suppression of the RDA in the colony.

The catalyst for the chaos was the removal of Étienne Djaument by Houphouët-Boigny from the RDA in early 1949. Djaument responded by forming a rival party, the Bloc Démocratique Eburnén. At the first meeting of this rival congress, supporters of Houphouët-Boigny responded with protests or rioting and in the resulting clash one person was killed and a number were injured. The French authorities, and the French colonists in the colony, used this opportunity to foment general unrest between the RDA party and its opponents and then used the unrest to justify the arrest of RDA members and violent suppression of party activities. This pattern of partisan outbursts, French violence against RDA supporters at these incidents, and the mass arrests of RDA supporters continued throughout 1949 and into early 1950. Although an arrest warrant was issued for Houphouët-Boigny, he was able to use immunity as a member of the National Assembly to avoid arrest. In December 1949, the RDA and its supporters began a general strike involving many different groups of workers, a boycott of European goods sold in the country, and a hunger strike in the prisons. The tension came to a head on 28 January 1950 when Victor Biaka Boda, an RDA member of the National Assembly, disappeared in the Ivory Coast. Upset by this event, the RDA held a protest in Dimbokro which resulted in a French army shooting of 13 Ivorian civilians. The next day (February 1), the French declared all RDA meetings illegal throughout all of French West Africa. The end result of the year of violence was over 50 dead and 3000 RDA partisans imprisoned.

Although RDA members of the National Assembly stopped going to sessions because they were largely ignored, following the French Army shooting in Dimbokro, Senghor led much of the African membership to demand an inquiry into the incident. The French government secretly informed RDA politicians in March that it had no intentions of implementing the 1 February decree banning all activities by the RDA and gradually the tension relaxed.

== Break with the Communists (1950–55) ==
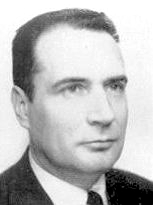
François Mitterrand in 1959 was a major figure facilitating the RDA's relationship with the UDSR.

Following the end to the chaos in the Ivory Coast, Houphouët-Boigny began to see the alliance with the Communist party in France as counterproductive to his larger goals. He began meetings simultaneously with both the IOM legislators and the radical wing of the RDA, led by d'Arboussier who he convinced to resign his position in the party. On 9 August 1950, the RDA and the IOM entered into a secret accord aiming to bring together the two groups in the French National Assembly, based primarily on the RDA ending their coalition with the Communist party. In domestic politics in the colonies, it was decided that the IOM and the RDA would largely retain power in the colonies which they controlled and thus prevent political conflict. The IOM was to be the main political party of the union in Guinea, Dahomey, Togo, Senegal (as Senghor had now joined the IOM), Upper Volta, Cameroon, and Ubangi-Shari while the RDA would be the representative of the alliance in French Sudan, Ivory Coast, Chad, and the Middle Congo. As both had a member of the National Assembly from Niger, the agreement was to keep that colony split. After this rapprochement between the two parties, the RDA broke with the Communist party and in December 1950 voted for the government of René Pleven. This would begin a long relationship between Pleven's party, the Democratic and Socialist Union of the Resistance (French: Union démocratique et socialiste de la Résistance, UDSR), and particularly with the young politician François Mitterrand, and the RDA.

Although Mitterrand tried to change French policy towards the RDA, the colonial administration was still focused primarily on removing the RDA from any power it had remaining. In preparation for the 1951 French elections, RDA supporters were removed from voter rolls by French authorities, areas with high RDA support experienced a number of voting problems, and members were arrested and intimidated from political activity. All this resulted in a significant loss to the RDA throughout Africa and only Houphouët-Boigny, Konate, and Tchicaya were National Assembly members from the RDA following the election. In the same election, the IOM gained most consistently becoming the largest political party in Africa. Although electoral results showed significant support of the IOM over the RDA, the IOM remained largely a legislative coalition in Paris with limited support as a regional party in Africa. The RDA, in contrast, continued its efforts to build broad political bases and build the national RDA parties throughout Africa.

The result of these efforts was that the RDA saw increasing power from 1951 until 1955. This was most punctuated with the rise in Guinea of Sékou Touré to political prominence as the head of the Democratic Party of Guinea French: Parti Démocratique de Guinée. As a union organizer, Touré had significant ties with the Communists throughout French West Africa and thus connected quickly with the Communist-affiliated members of the RDA. His importance to the RDA's wider objectives was so large that he was named the head of the RDA coalition in the National Assembly in 1953. In the 1955 meeting of the Coordinating Council the party similarly consolidated around the new party identity. First, they decided that Ruben Um Nyobé's Union of the Peoples of Cameroon (UPC) was no longer affiliated with the RDA because of its radical positions against the French state. Second, it settled a dispute in Niger with multiple parties claiming to be the RDA affiliate: supporting Hamani Diori's party over that of Djibo Bakary. The party building activities set the RDA up to perform well in the upcoming election.

== Return to power and dissolution: 1956–58 ==
Without the active suppression of earlier elections and the end of the temporary IOM-RDA rapprochement, the RDA became the largest party from the African colonies earning nine seats in the French legislative elections of 1956 (from only having 3 in the period of 1951-1955). The IOM saw the largest losses going from having fourteen deputies to only seven. The remaining seats saw six deputies go to persons allied with the Gaullist Party, four deputies allied with the Socialist party, and two who affiliated with Catholic conservatives (Apithy and Barthélemy Boganda). The RDA legislators were now more than half of the total membership of the UDSR party, which actually resulted in the party changing its name to the UDSR-RDA during this period. Because of this, when the IOM tried once again to form an alliance with the RDA, they were rebuffed because the RDA had a solid alliance with significant power and the IOM wanted to remain with the MRP. In addition, because of the important role of the RDA within the UDSR, Houphouët-Boigny was able to become a Minister within the French cabinet, the first representative from French West Africa or French Equatorial Africa to achieve this. Further empowering the RDA during this time was a shift in the French colonial administration not wanting to see additional colonial violence like had been experienced in Madagascar, Indochina, and Algeria.

During this time, the French political parties passed the Loi Cadre which significantly reformed the relationship between France and the colonies by granting expanded power to Territorial Assemblies in each colony. Because the reform did not go far enough in expanding self-rule to the colonies, the African legislators largely opposed it. The Socialists were the only political faction to vote for the law and although Houphouët-Boigny was required to vote for it because of his ministerial post, he organized to have the RDA vote against the legislation. Despite this opposition, the legislation passed and Territorial Assembly elections were held in March 1957. For these elections, the IOM had reformed itself into the African Convention (French: Convention Africaine), in order to try to have a larger domestic base. The only other regional party of significance for these elections was a newly focused set of Socialist politicians.

In the 1957 Territorial Assembly elections, the RDA gained clear majorities in Guinea, Chad, the Ivory Coast, and, under the new leadership of Modibo Keïta, the French Sudan. Of the 474 seats up for election, 236 went to RDA politicians (49.79%), 62 went to the Socialists, 58 went to the African Convention, and the rest were split between national parties without regional influence in Mauritania and Dahomey.

From this position of power, Houphouët-Boigny called for a Third Party Congress to bring together all the members. The last party congress had been in 1949 and, despite calls for an open congress from the Communist wing of the RDA for years, it had been resisted by the party leadership. The main debate at the congress focused on the issue of federalism and the relationship with France for the future. Houphouët-Boigny, who saw the Congress as an opportunity to show off political power to his French guests (including Mitterrand) in attendance, argued that the colonies should enter into a federal relationship with France remaining the center of political life. Touré and Keïta, the younger RDA leaders, in contrast pushed for an independent African federation. The situation led to many embarrassing political votes for Houphouët-Boigny and eventually the adoption of a compromise position that the party would commit itself to working for democratization of any federal arrangements which existed.

When many of the other parties in West and Equatorial Africa proposed another attempt at rapprochement between the parties, the RDA responded with little enthusiasm. This eventually led to the creation of the African Regroupment Party (French: Parti du Regroupement Africain, PRA) which would serve as a rival to the RDA between the various other parties: including bringing together the African Convention and the Socialists. By mid-1958, French Africa along the Atlantic had developed largely a two-party system.

With the dissolution of the French Fourth Republic, the RDA became a key party shaping the colonial relationship that would exist in the next French state. DeGaulle appointed Houphouët-Boigny to assist in developing the specific laws for the new constitution which would govern the colonies. Houphouët-Boigny pushed for a strong federation linking France with the colonies, while the PRA, led by Senghor, pushed for a looser confederation arrangement. In a meeting on 18 July 1958, the PRA and RDA agreed that the eventual arrangement must include the right to self-determination for the colonies.

This resulted in a law which would give each colony the right to vote to join a newly organized French Community which would keep the colonies linked to France but also provide some degree of self-rule, or to declare independence immediately. The RDA was divided on this position. The leaders with the most linkages to the trade-unions, mainly Touré in Guinea, generally believed that it was best for the French colonies to declare independence immediately. Houphouët-Boigny and others, instead, pushed for joining the French Community and remaining very close with France. In addition, the Ivory Coast, as the wealthiest colony in French West Africa, opposed the proposal from Keïta that the colonies should become independent together as an African federation. Mortimer claims that the key person holding the party together and working towards a compromise had been Daniel Ouezzin Coulibaly who died suddenly on 7 September, thus sealing the fate of the party.

The result was that the RDA, as a regional party, essentially ended with the independence vote in 1958. Guinea was the only country to vote for independence, incurring the immediate wrath of DeGaulle and Houphouët-Boigny who cut off aid to the colony and the French removed all personnel and equipment that was in the colony. Ivory Coast voted for the French Community and Houphouët-Boigny became a leader of the Conseil de l'Entente, a block of countries including the Ivory Coast, Niger, Upper Volta, and Dahomey which worked to maintain connections to France while becoming independent. French Sudan initially joined a brief federation with Senegal called the Mali Federation, bringing RDA leader Keïta and PRA leader Senghor together. However, this broke apart and the French Sudan (now the independent country called Mali) instead joined an informal grouping with Ghana and Guinea called the Union of African States which pushed for pan-African alternatives to Senghor's socialism and the Conseil de l'Entente continued linkages with France. Although the name Rassemblement Démocratique Africain and identification with this regional grouping remained in many of the local parties, the RDA as a regional party would never form again after the vote of 1958.

== National RDA parties ==
The following were parties which were directly members of the regional RDA at some point. Some of the parties directly integrated RDA into their names, and these names remained even after the regional coalition ended.

French West Africa

- Côte d'Ivoire
  - Democratic Party of Côte d'Ivoire (PDCI)
- Dahomey (currently Benin)
  - Dahomeyan Progressive Union (UPD) (1946-September 1948)
  - Both the Dahomeyan Democratic Union (UDD) and the Dahomeyan Democratic Rally (RDD) claimed to be the RDA affiliate after the mid-1950s.
- French Sudan (currently Mali)
  - Progressive Sudanese Party (PSP) (only a member at 1946 party congress)
  - Sudanese Union-African Democratic Rally (US/RDA) (after November 1946)
- Guinea
  - Democratic Party of Guinea (expelled in 1959)
- Mauritania
  - No major RDA affiliated party
- Niger
  - Nigerien Progressive Party (leadership change in 1951)
- Senegal
  - Senegalese Democratic Union (1946–51)
  - Senegalese Popular Movement (after 1951)
- Upper Volta (currently Burkino Faso)
  - Voltaic Democratic Union-African Democratic Rally
- French Togoland (currently Togo)
  - No major RDA affiliated party

French Equatorial Africa

- Chad
  - Chadian Progressive Party (PPT)
- Oubangui-Chari (currently Central African Republic)
  - Union Oubanguienne
- French Congo (currently The Republic of Congo)
  - Congolese Progressive Party (PPC) (1946–57)
  - Democratic Union for the Defense of African Interests (UDDIA) (after 1957)
- Gabon
  - Gabonese Mixed Committee (CMG)
- French Cameroon (currently part of Cameroon)
  - Union of the Peoples of Cameroon (1946–50)

== Coalitions with political parties ==
The RDA maintained ties with a number of parties in France and in West Africa. Brief rapprochements with African parties never formed into solid coalitions, but the relationships with some French political parties lasted for many years. These included formal coalitions, brief partnerships, and loose affiliations. In addition, a number of parties opposed the RDA and worked against the party.

Party affiliations of the RDA
(approximate dates)

== External resources ==
- "African Democratic Rally (1946-)". BlackPast.org. 12 April 2009.
- "International Symposium on the History of the RDA" (PDF). UNESCO.
- "Le congrès de Bamako ou la naissance du RDA". webAfriqa.
