= Thiesian Democratic Front =

Political party in Senegal

Thiesian Democratic Front (in French: Front Démocratique Thiesois) was a political party in Thies, Senegal. FDT merged into the Senegalese Popular Bloc.

== Sources ==
- Nzouankeu, Jacques Mariel. Les partis politiques sénégalais. Dakar: Editions Clairafrique, 1984.
