= Democratic Regroupment of Kolda =

Political party in Senegal

Democratic Regroupment of Kolda (in French: Regroupement démocratique de Kolda) was a political party in Kolda, Senegal. It existed around 1960.
