= Independent Party of the Community of the Cap-Vert Peninsula =

Political party in Senegal

Independent Party of the Community of the Cap-Vert Peninsula (in French: Parti Indépendant de la Communauté de la Presqu'île du Cap-Vert) was a political party in Cap Vert Peninsula, Senegal. It existed around 1960.

== Sources ==
- Nzouankeu, Jacques Mariel. Les partis politiques sénégalais. Dakar: Editions Clairafrique, 1984.
