= Communist Study Groups =

Communist Study Groups (in French: Groupes d'Etudes Communistes), was a communist group in colonial French West Africa/French Equatorial Africa. GEC was founded in 1943, under the influence of the French Communist Party. GEC formed branches in the capital cities of the West African territories. GEC was primarily based amongst intellectuals. It was led by Suret-Canale and Cauche.

In the 1946 French legislative elections, GEC received 1180 votes (0.9%) in Senegal.

In Senegal, GEC evolved into the Senegalese Democratic Union, section of the African Democratic Rally.

In Bamako, Modibo Keita was a prominent member of GEC. GEC supported his candidacy in the elections to the Constituent Assembly of the Fourth Republic in 1945.

In February 1946 the first GEC group was established in French Equatorial Africa, founded by Europeans in Brazzaville.
