= African Regroupment Party – Senegal =

Political party in Senegal

African Regroupment Party-Senegal (in French: Parti du Regroupement Africain-Sénégal) was a Marxist political party in Senegal. Formed in September 1958, following a split in the Senegalese Progressive Union (UPS). PRA adhered to the African Regroupment Party (PRA).

The party published the newspaper Indépendance Africaine.

In 1964 PRA-Sénégal split, and a minority formed African Regroupment Party-Renewal (PRA-Rénovation) which opted for quick merger with UPS.

In 1966 PRA-Sénégal rejoined UPS.

== Sources ==
- Zuccarelli, François. La vie politique sénégalaise (1940-1988). Paris: CHEAM, 1988.
