= Senegalese Popular Bloc =

Senegalese political faction

The Senegalese Popular Bloc (French: Bloc Populaire Sénégalais, BPS) was the result of the merger of the Senegalese Democratic Bloc (BDS) of Léopold Sédar Senghor, Senegalese Democratic Union (UDS), Casamancian Autonomous Movement (MAC) and a fraction of the Senegalese Popular Movement (MPS) led by Abdolaye Thiaw. It held its constitutive congress in Dakar from February 23–25, 1957. The merger was however already in effect since August 1956.

The congress elected Senghor as its political director and Mamadou Dia as the general secretary.

On January 11 the same year BPS organized a meeting in Dakar, launching the African Convention. The Convention was intended to evolve into an all-AOF party. The launching of the Convention was preceded by failed efforts of unity between BPS and the African Democratic Rally (RDA). Senghor wanted the Convention to fill the role of a party corresponding to the Indépendants d'Outre-Mer parliamentary fraction that he belonged to.

In 1958 the African Convention and the African Socialist Movement merged to form the African Regroupment Party (PRA). As a result of this merger BPS merged with the Senegalese section of MSA, Senegalese Party of Socialist Action (PSAS), and formed the Senegalese Progressive Union (UPS).

== Bibliography ==
- Borella, François, L'évolution politique et juridique de l'Union française depuis 1946, Paris, Librairie générale de droit et de jurisprudence, 1958, p. 86; 89; 90
- Zuccarelli, François, La vie politique sénégalaise (1940-1988), Paris, CHEAM, 1988
- Boone, Catherine. Merchant Capital and the Roots of State Power in Senegal: 1930-1985, Cambridge University Press (2006), p. 85, ISBN 9780521030397 (Retrieved 30 March 2019)
- Heyns, Christof, Human Rights Law in Africa 1998, Martinus Nijhoff Publishers (2001), p. 385, ISBN 9789041115782 (Retrieved 30 March 2019)
- Socialist Affairs, Volumes 22-23, Socialist International (1972), pp. 82–84
- Coleman, James S.; Coleman, James Smoot; and Rosberg, Carl G.; Political Parties and National Integration in Tropical Africa, University of California Press (1970), pp. 22–25, ISBN 9780520002531 (Retrieved 30 March 2019)
