= Senegalese Democratic Union =

Political party in Senegal

- Founded: 1946
- Dissolved: 1956
- Preceded by: Communist Study Groups
- Merged into: Senegalese Popular Bloc
- Ideology: Socialism
- International affiliation: African Democratic Rally

Senegalese Democratic Union (in French: Union Démocratique Sénégalais) was a political party in Senegal, founded in 1946 by the Communist Study Groups (GEC). UDS became affiliated as the Senegalese section of the African Democratic Rally (RDA).

Later in 1955 the UDS was expelled from RDA, and substituted by the less radical Senegalese Popular Movement (MPS).

In 1956 UDS decided to merge into the Senegalese Popular Bloc (BPS). Former UDS cadres played an important role in the formation of African Regroupment Party-Senegal (PRA-Sénégal).
