= Party for Solidarity and Development of Senegal – Sunu Party =

Political party in Senegal

Party for Solidarity and Development of Senegal – Sunu Party (Parti pour la solidarité et le développement du Sénégal-Sunu parti, PSDS-Sunu parti) is a political party in Senegal, led by Colonel Malick Cissé. The party supports the current Senegalese president, Abdoulaye Wade.
