= Mamadou Dia =

1st Prime Minister of Senegal

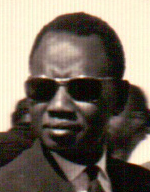
- Dia in 1962

1st Prime Minister of Senegal
- In office 18 May 1957 – 18 December 1962
- President: Léopold Sédar Senghor
- Preceded by: None
- Succeeded by: Abdou Diouf

Personal details
- Born: 18 July 1910 Kombolé, French West Africa (now Senegal)
- Died: 25 January 2009 (aged 98) Dakar, Senegal
- Party: Senegalese Democratic Bloc

Mamadou Dia (18 July 1910 – 25 January 2009) was a Senegalese politician who served as the first Prime Minister of Senegal from 1957 until 1962, when he was forced to resign and was subsequently imprisoned amidst allegations that he was planning to stage a military coup to overthrow President Léopold Sédar Senghor.

== Biography ==
=== Early life and education ===
Of rural origin, Mamadou Dia was born in Khombole, in the Thies Region of Senegal, on 18 July 1910. His father, a veteran-turned-policeman, played a key role in transmitting the faith of Sufi Islam to his son and was an important example of rectitude for Dia.

A former pupil of the Blanchot elementary school in Saint-Louis, Dia began his more formal education in a Quranic school and transitioned into receiving a Western education at the École William Ponty, the principal training ground of the elite in French Africa in the 1920s and 30s. Before entering politics in the early 1940s (becoming motivated to do so only after the Vichy regime collapsed), he worked as a journalist, teacher and school director.

In his book “Africa, the Price of Freedom” (2001, edited by L'Harmattan) he stated his belief that he was born (according to some papers belonging to his father he had found) in July 1911, not 1910. A teacher altered official documents to allow him to pass the competition for the William Ponty school, as he would have been too young to compete otherwise.

=== Political career ===
Dia embarked on his political career in 1947 as a leader in the Grand Council of the Afrique occidentale française (AOF) and as Secretary General of the Senegalese Democratic Bloc (BDS) from 1948. He served in the French Senate from 1948 to 1956 and as deputy in the French National Assembly from 1956 to 1958, sitting with the parliamentary group of Overseas Independent (IOM). With Senghor, Dia formed the African Convention Party (PCA) in January 1957 from the BDS. When French president Charles de Gaulle proposed a referendum on the French community in 1958, Dia and Senghor held opposite views of the proposal: Dia favored breaking with France, whereas Senghor hoped to keep Senegal in the community.

During his two terms as a senator, Mamadou Dia voted for the ratification of the Atlantic Pact (July 28, 1949), the Marie law favorable to private education (September 12), and the ratification of the Treaty establishing the European Coal and Steel Community (1 April 1952). On March 26, 1955, he opposed plans relating to the WEU, the end of the occupation in Germany, its entry into NATO, and the Saar Agreement. It approved the draft law on state of emergency in Algeria (1 st April) and abstained on the draft electoral reform restoring the district election (15 November). He was also an active member of parliament, being a frequent speaker and devoting himself to the concerns of the overseas territories.

Independence Day, 4 April 1962, official car with Prime Minister Mamadou Dia wearing sunglasses.

Dia was one of the main figures (namely, the vice premier) of the abortive Mali Federation of Senegal and Sudanese Republic (later Mali) until its collapse. Once Senegalese independence became official on August 20, 1960, he became prime minister, in tandem with Senghor as President of the Republic of Senegal. Senghor, as a Catholic in a largely Islamic country, valued having a widely connected and able Muslim as his deputy. However, Dia’s time as Prime Minister was often controversial and his radical socialist views often clashed with those of the more moderate Senghor.

=== Departure from Senghor and imprisonment ===
After slightly more than two years of participation in the legislature, Mamadou Dia was accused of plotting a coup against President Senghor. However, the accusers did not produce definitive evidence of their claim. It was taken at the time as a classic example of the difficulties of power sharing in newly-formed states: Dia embodied the summit of the State in a two-headed parliamentary system (economic and internal policy for him, foreign policy for the president).

The pair's different views concerning the economy contributed greatly to their split: there was a serious liberal and pro-French versus conservative and patriotic policy divide. In fact, Dia began to implement some of the ideas he had articulated in his book Réflexions sur l'Économie de l'Afrique Noire (1960). In so doing, he caused concern among the Marabouts, powerful religious leaders who controlled the groundnut business and ran counter to French interests.

As result of the grave power struggle between the two former political allies, a group of dissident parliamentarians whom Senghor supported tabled a motion of no confidence against the government—thus against Dia. He responded by invoking his executive powers and ordering the army to lock the assembly building before the parliament could vote on the motion. Senghor declared that Dia attempted a coup and mobilized the army, whom allied themselves with Senghor overall. Dia and several of his ministers were arrested and tried for treason. Eventually, he was forced to resign and received a sentence of life imprisonment subsequently. Initially sentenced to imprisonment in the eastern town of Kédougou, he was pardoned by President Senghor on March 27, 1974 and granted amnesty in 1976.

=== Later life ===
His lost political power did not break his spirit. Dia attempted to restart his career in the early 1980s when Abdou Diouf introduced multiparty democracy, but the small, Dia-led People Democratic Movement found little support. Thus, he never returned to a position of power; however, he remained an iconic figure in Senegalese politics, retaining an intellectual and moral influence on the country. He accompanied the Senegalese state during the years of decolonization and remained one of the main figures in the construction of modern Senegal. He even acquired the role of national treasure, as he continued to write diatribes in the local press well into his 90s regularly. He was noted especially for his attacks on the neo-liberal economic policies of the current president, Abdoulaye Wade, who had been one of the lawyers who defended Dia in 1963. When he died aged 98 in Dakar on 25 January 2009, there was a massive outpouring of sentiment in national newspapers due to admiration for his obdurate attachment to his principles.

Maâti Monjib stated that "Dia never abandoned his idealism in favor of becoming a statesman".

== Church and state relations during the Dia Premiership ==
When Léopold Senghor (Catholic) and Mamadou Dia (Muslim) led Senegal to independence, they had very clear ideas of what ideological and philosophical values would form the basis of the new State. African socialism, spirituality, and secularism were the concepts to guide the country towards modernity and development with a spirit of tolerance and pluralism to define their project. The two figures were both fundamentally convinced of both the necessity of a secular state and that religious fervor is an essential cultural energy for achieving modernization. As such, they charged themselves and their public, the nation's institutions, the party, and especially those involved in political discourse altogether with the mission of realizing the ideal of a nation uplifted by the spirit, committed to secularism and thus, ultimately, prosperous.

For example, Dia’s reflections on Islam (like those contained in his Islam, African Societies and Industrial Culture) are useful to understand the degree of faith he had in this spiritual socialism as a motivating force of development in Senegal.

“Islam must remind the Muslim world […] that if it is required to act, it is so that one may fulfill oneself, that one may achieve even richer being. For industrial development to be a boon and not the ruin of mankind, it is crucial that it retain a human dimension, that it not give rise to a new kind of slavery under the pretense of promoting productivity or efficacy, that it not create progress that is in reality perversion, desire of well-being and not of better-being […]”

It is the philosophy of a modern Islam actively participating in a process of transformation of itself and of the world in conformity with demands of justice.

This interpretation of secularization removed Senegal as the heir of France (where secularization takes the form of a permanent hostility to any manifestation of religion) and placed it closer to an Anglo-Saxon model of relations between church and State, aiming to guarantee the autonomy of religious communities.

Unfortunately for the two leaders, the reality differed from their hopes for the newly independent Senegal when they undertook their work. Senghor and Dia had to renounce to their ideas somewhat and accept a compromise with the Marabouts to guarantee their political support, especially during elections (which thus became an integral part of Senegalese political life). Eventually, the boundaries between religion and politics in the public sphere blurred more than they hoped would happen initially.

== Publications ==
- Contribution à l'étude du mouvement coopératif en Afrique noire, Présence africaine, 1951
- Réflexions sur l'économie de l'Afrique noire, Éditions africaines, 1954
- L'économie africaine : études et problèmes nouveaux, Presses universitaires de France, 1957
- Nations africaines et solidarité mondiale, Presses universitaires de France, 1960
- Islam, sociétés africaines et culture industrielle, Nouvelles éditions africaines, 1975
- Essais sur l'Islam, vol. 1, Islam et humanisme, Nouvelles éditions africaines, 1977
- Essais sur l'Islam, vol. 2, Socio-anthropologie de l'Islam, Nouvelles éditions africaines, 1979
- Essais sur l'Islam, vol. 3, Islam et civilisations négro-africaines, Nouvelles éditions africaines, 1980
- Mémoires d'un militant du Tiers monde : si mémoire ne ment, Publisud, 1985
- A governance approach to civil service reform in Sub-Saharan Africa, World Bank, 1993
- Africa's management in the 1990s and beyond : reconciling indigenous and transplanted institutions, World Bank, 1996
- Kaso : le migrant perpétuel, Esprit frappeur, 1999
- Afrique : le prix de la liberté, L'Harmattan, 2001
- Échec de l'alternance au Sénégal et crise du monde libéral, L'Harmattan, 2005
- Sénégal, radioscopie d'une alternance avortée (articles)
- Corbeille pour l'an 2000, Éditions Paix et développement, Dakar, 1995

== Bibliography ==
- Pamela Cox and Richard Kessler. Après Senghor a Socialist Senegal? African Affairs. Volume 79, Number 316. pp. 327–342
- Souleymane Bachir Diagne, Religion and the Public Sphere in Senegal: The Evolution of a Project of Modernity in Miguel Vatter, ed., Crediting God: Sovereignty and Religion in the Age of Global Capitalism, Fordham University Press, 2011, pp. 102 – 114
- Kaye Whiteman, Mamadou Dia, the Guardian, 2 Feb 2009.
- (in French) F. Diaye, M. Printz, Tine, Visages publics au Sénégal. 10 personnalités politiques parlent, L'Harmattan, 1991, 260 p. ISBN 2-7384-0567-3
- (in French) Babacar Ndiaye et Waly Ndiaye, Présidents et ministres de la République du Sénégal, Dakar, 2000.
- (in French) Laurent Correau, Mamadou Dia, l’homme du refus, RFI.fr, 26 janvier 2009.
- (in French) Valérie Nivelon and Maxime Grember, Mamadou Dia parle, histoire d’une archive inédite, RFI.fr, 25 janvier 2019.
- (in French) Maâti Monjib, Mamadou Dia et les relations franco-sénégalaises (1957-1962), Horizons Maghrébins - Le droit à la mémoire, Année 2005, pp. 40–53.

== Filmography ==
- « La crise éclair qu'a vécue Dakar » (en ligne, un document audiovisuel de l'INA de 1' 23, retraçant la tentative de coup d'État de Mamadou Dia, diffusé à l'origine par les Actualités françaises le 26 décembre 1962)
- « Le Sénégal après la crise » (en ligne, un document audiovisuel de l'INA de 7' 20, proposant un bilan après le coup d'État avorté de Mamadou Dia, diffusé à l'origine au cours du Journal télévisé de l'ORTF le 27 décembre 1962)

== See also ==
- Politics of Senegal
- History of Senegal
- Mali Federation
- Leopold Senghor

Political offices
Preceded by (–)	Prime Minister of Senegal; 1960–1962	Succeeded by Post Abolished
