= French Section of the Workers' International =

Political party in France

French Section of the Workers' International Section française de l'Internationale ouvrière
- Leader: Jean Jaurès; Léon Blum; Guy Mollet
- Founders: Jules Guesde; Jean Jaurès
- Founded: 25 April 1905; 121 years ago
- Dissolved: 4 May 1969; 57 years ago
- Merger of: French Socialist Party; Socialist Party of France
- Merged into: Socialist Party
- Headquarters: Paris
- Newspaper: Le Populaire (from 1918); L'Humanité (until 1920)
- Trade union: Workers' Force
- Ideology: Social democracy; Socialism; Democratic socialism; Until 1920: Communism (French)
- Political position: Left-wing
- National affiliation: Lefts Cartel (1924–1934); Popular Front (1936–1938); Tripartisme (1944–1947); Third Force (1947–1958); Federation of the Democratic and Socialist Left (1965–1968)
- European Parliament group: Socialist Group
- International affiliation: Second International (1905–1916); Labour and Socialist International (1923–1940); Socialist International (1951–1969)
- Colours: Red

The French Section of the Workers' International (French: Section française de l'Internationale ouvrière, SFIO) was a major social democratic political party in France which was founded in 1905 and succeeded in 1969 by the present Socialist Party.

The SFIO was founded in 1905 as the French representative to the Second International, merging the Marxist Socialist Party of France led by Jules Guesde and the possibilist French Socialist Party led by Jean Jaurès, who became the SFIO's leading figure. Electoral support for the party rose from 10 percent in the 1906 election to 17 percent in 1914, and during World War I it participated in France's national unity government, sacrificing its ideals of internationalist class struggle in favor of national patriotism, as did most other members of the Second International. In 1920, the SFIO split over views on the 1917 Russian Revolution; the majority became the French Communist Party, while the minority continued as the SFIO.

In the 1930s, mutual concern over fascism drew the communists and socialists together, prompting them to form the Popular Front. The coalition won the 1936 election and formed a government under SFIO leader Léon Blum, which lasted until 1938. After the outbreak of World War II and German conquest of France in 1940, the SFIO was banned, and many of its members took part in the Resistance. The SFIO was part of France's tripartisme government from 1944 to 1947, but after the war faced a resurgent Communist Party, which achieved a higher share of the vote in every election for the next three decades. From 1956 to 1957, SFIO leader Guy Mollet served as prime minister, but the party continued its period of decline and disunity. In 1969, the present Socialist Party of France was formed from a merger of the SFIO and smaller parties.

Between 1909 and 1920, the SFIO published the newspaper L'Humanité. In French politics, it affiliated with the Left Cartel (1924–1926, and 1934), the Popular Front (1936–1938), the Tripartisme (1944–1947), and the Third Force (1947–1958). Internationally, the party was first affiliated with the Second International (1905–1916), then the Labour and Socialist International (1923–1940), and finally the Socialist International (1951–1969). The SFIO's symbol was a red and black circle with the Three Arrows.

== Background ==
After the failure of the Paris Commune of 1871, French socialism was severely weakened, with its leaders dead or in exile. During the 1879 Marseille Congress, workers' associations created the Federation of the Socialist Workers of France (FTSF). Three years later, Jules Guesde and Paul Lafargue (the son-in-law of Karl Marx) left the federation, which they considered too moderate, and founded the French Workers' Party (POF). The FTSF led by Paul Brousse was defined as possibilist because it advocated gradual reforms whereas the POF promoted Marxism. At the same time, Édouard Vaillant and the heirs of Louis Auguste Blanqui founded the Central Revolutionary Committee (CRC) which represented the French revolutionary tradition.

In the 1880s, the FTSF saw their first electoral success, winning control of some municipalities. Jean Allemane and some FTSF members criticised the focus on electoral goals. In 1890, they created the Revolutionary Socialist Workers' Party (POSR). Their main objective was to win power through the tactic of the general strike. Besides these groups, some politicians declared themselves as independent socialists outside of the political parties. They tended to have moderate opinions.

In the 1890s, the Dreyfus affair caused debate in the socialist movement. While Jules Guesde believed socialists should not intervene in this internal conflict of the bourgeoisie, Jean Jaurès urged the socialist movement to join the republican movement's struggle to defend republican values. In 1899, another debate polarised the socialist groups, pitted Guesde against Jaures over the participation of the socialist Alexandre Millerand in Pierre Waldeck-Rousseau's cabinet, which included the Marquis de Gallifet, who had directed the bloody repression of the Paris Commune. In 1902, Guesde and Vaillant founded the Socialist Party of France while Jaurès, Allemane and the possibilists formed the French Socialist Party. During the 1905 Globe Congress, the two groups merged into the French Section of the Workers' International (SFIO) under pressure from the Second International.

== History ==
=== Foundation and early years ===
The new SFIO party was hemmed between the middle-class liberals of the Radical Party and the revolutionary syndicalists who dominated the trade unions. The General Confederation of Labour (CGT) proclaimed its independence from political parties at this time and the non-distinction between political and industrial aims. In addition, some CGT members refused to join the SFIO because they considered it extremist. They created the Republican-Socialist Party (PRS).

In contrast to other European socialist parties, the SFIO was a decentralised organization. Its national and executive institutions were weakened by the strong autonomy of its members and local levels of the party. Consequently, the function of secretary general, held by Louis Dubreuilh until 1918, was essentially administrative and the real political leader was Jean Jaurès, president of the parliamentary group and director of L'Humanité, the party's newspaper,

Unlike the PRS, SFIO members did not participate in Left Bloc governments, although they supported a part of its policy, notably the laïcité, based on the 1905 Act of separation between church and state. However, they criticized the ferocious repression of strikes by Radical prime minister Georges Clemenceau after 1906, following the creation of a Minister of Labour, a post held by PRS leader René Viviani.

During the July 1914 international crisis, the party was ideologically torn between its membership in the Socialist International and the wave of patriotism within France. The assassination of Jaurès on 31 July 1914 was a setback for the pacifist wing of the party and contributed to the massive increase in support for the wartime government of national unity. Participation in World War I caused divisions within the party which were accentuated after 1917. Furthermore, internal disagreements appeared about the October 1917 Bolshevik Revolution in Russia.

In 1919, the anti-war socialists were heavily defeated in elections by the National Bloc coalition which played on the middle-classes' fear of Bolshevism (posters with a Bolshevik with a knife between his teeth were used to discredit the socialist movement). The National Bloc won 70% of the seats, forming what became known as the Chambre bleue horizon (Blue Horizon Chamber).

=== Communist split and the Popular Front ===
During the Tours Congress on 25 December 1920, a majority of SFIO members voted to join the Communist International, also known as the Comintern and the Third International, created by the Bolsheviks after the October Revolution. Led by Boris Souvarine and Ludovic-Oscar Frossard, they created the French Section of the Communist International (SFIC). Another smaller group also favoured membership in the Comintern, but not all 21 conditions. The minority led by Léon Blum and the majority of the Socialists' elected members decided in Blum's words to "keep the old house" and remain within the Second International. Marcel Sembat, Léon Blum and Albert Thomas refused to align themselves with Moscow. Paul Faure became secretary general of the SFIO, but its most influential figure was Blum, leader of the parliamentary group and director of a new party paper Le Populaire. L'Humanité, the previous party newspaper, was controlled by the founders of the SFIC. However, Frossard later resigned from the SFIC and rejoined the SFIO in January 1923. One year after the Tours Congress, the CGT trade union made the same split. Those who became Communists created the Confédération générale du travail unitaire (United General Confederation of Labour; CGTU) which fused again with the CGT in 1936 during the Popular Front government. Léon Jouhaux was the CGT's main leader until 1947 and the new split leading to the creation of the reformist union confederation Workers' Force (CGT-FO).

In both 1924 and 1932, the Socialists joined with the Radicals in the Cartel des Gauches coalition. They supported the government led by Radical Édouard Herriot (1924–1926 and 1932), but they did not participate. The first Cartel saw the right-wing terrorised and capital flight destabilised the government while the divided Radicals did not all support their Socialist allies. The monetary crisis, also due to the refusal of Germany to pay the World War I reparations, caused parliamentary instability. Édouard Herriot, Paul Painlevé and Aristide Briand succeeded each other as prime minister until 1926, when the French right came back to power with Raymond Poincaré. The newly elected Communist deputies also opposed the first Cartel, refusing to support bourgeois governments. The second Cartel acceded to power in 1932, but this time the SFIO only gave their support without the participation of the Radicals which allied themselves with right-wing radicals. After years of internal feuds, the reformist wing of the party led by Marcel Déat and Pierre Renaudel split from the SFIO in November 1933 to form a neosocialist movement and merged with the PRS to form the Socialist Republican Union (USR). The Cartel was again the victim of parliamentary instability while various scandals led to the 6 February 1934 riots organised by far-right leagues. The Radical Édouard Daladier resigned on the next day, handing out the power to conservative Gaston Doumergue. It was the first time during the French Third Republic that a government had to resign because of street pressure.

Following 6 February 1934 crisis, which the whole of the socialist movement saw as a fascist conspiracy to overthrow the Republic, a goal pursued by the royalist Action Française and other far-right leagues, anti-fascist organisations were created. The Comintern abandoned its social-fascism directive of social democracy in favor of united front directives. The French Communist Party (PCF) got closer to the SFIO, the USR and the Radical Party to form the coalition that would win the 1936 French legislative election and bring about the Popular Front. In June 1934, Leon Trotsky proposed the French Turn into the SFIO, the origin of the strategy of entrism. The Trotskyist leaders of the Communist League (the French section of the International Left Opposition) were divided over the issue of entering the SFIO. Raymond Molinier was the most supportive of Trotsky's proposal while Pierre Naville was opposed to it and Pierre Frank remained ambivalent. The League finally voted to dissolve into the SFIO in August 1934, where they formed the Bolshevik-Leninist Group (Groupe Bolchevik-Leniniste, GBL). At the Mulhouse party congress of June 1935, the Trotskyists led a campaign to prevent the united front from expanding into a popular front which would include the liberal Radical Party.

The Popular Front strategy was adopted in the 1936 French legislative election and the coalition gained a majority, with SFIO obtaining for the first time more votes and seats than the Radical Party. Léon Blum became France's first Socialist prime minister in 1936 while the PCF supported without participation his government. A general strike applauded the socialists' victory while Marceau Pivert cried "Tout est possible!" ("Everything is possible!"), but Pivert would later split and create the Workers and Peasants' Socialist Party (PSOP), with historian Daniel Guérin also being a member of the latter. Trotsky advised the GBL to break with the SFIO, leading to a confused departure by the Trotskyists from the SFIO in early 1936, which drew only about six hundred people from the party. The Matignon Accords (1936) set up collective bargaining, and removed all obstacles to union organisation. The terms included a blanket 7–12% wage increase and allowed for paid vacation (two weeks) and a 40-hour work week. The eight-hour day had been established following the war of 1914–1918 of attrition and its mobilisation of industrial capacities.

Within a year, Blum's government collapsed over economic policy (as during the Cartel des gauches, when capital flight was an issue, giving rise to the so-called "myth of the 200 families") in the context of the Great Depression and also over the issue of the Spanish Civil War. The demoralised left fell apart and was unable to resist the collapse of the Third Republic after the fall of France in the military defeat of 1940 during World War II.

=== World War II ===
A number of SFIO members were part of the Vichy 80 who refused to vote extraordinary powers to Marshal Philippe Pétain in July 1940, following which the latter proclaimed the Révolution nationale reactionary program and the establishment of the Vichy regime. Although some engaged in collaborationism, an important part also took part in the Resistance and they eventually went on to be part of the National Council of the Resistance. Pierre Fourcaud created with Félix Gouin the Brutus Network in which Gaston Defferre, later mayor of Marseilles for years, participated along with Daniel Mayer. In 1942–1943, Pétain's regime judged the French Third Republic by organising a public trial, the Riom Trial, of personalities accused of having caused the country's defeat in the Battle of France. They included Léon Blum, the Radical Édouard Daladier and the conservatives Paul Reynaud and Georges Mandel, among others.

At the same time, Marcel Déat and some neosocialists who had split from the SFIO in 1933, participated to the Vichy regime and supported Pétain's policy of collaboration. Paul Faure, secretary general of the SFIO from 1920 to 1940, approved of this policy too. He was excluded from the party when it was reconstituted in 1944. In total, 14 of the 17 SFIO ministers who had been in government before the war were expelled for collaboration.

=== Fourth Republic ===
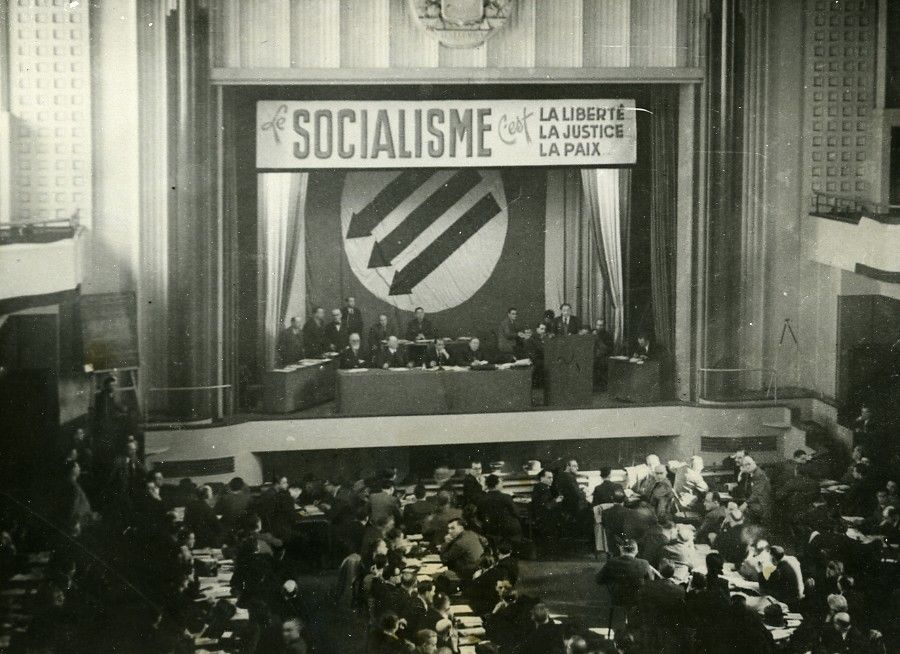
Extraordinary National Congress of the SFIO held in Montrouge, 29–31 March 1946

After the liberation of France in 1944, the PCF became the largest left-wing party and the project to create a labour-based political party rallying the non-Communist Resistance failed in part due to the disagreements opposing notably the Socialists and the Christian Democrats about laïcité and the conflict with Charles de Gaulle about the new organisation of the institutions (parliamentary system or presidential government). The SFIO re-emerged and participated in the three-parties alliance with the PCF and the Christian-democratic Popular Republican Movement (MRP). This coalition led the social policy inspired by National Council of Resistance's programme, installing the main elements of the French welfare state, nationalising banks and some industrial companies. While serving in government during the Forties, the SFIO was partly responsible for setting up the welfare state institutions of the Liberation period and helping to bring about France's economic recovery. In May 1946, the Socialist-led government of Félix Gouin passed a law that generalised social security, making it obligatory for the whole population. A number of progressive reforms were also introduced during Paul Ramadier's tenure as prime minister in 1947, including the extension of social security to government workers the introduction of a national minimum wage and the granting from April 1947 onwards of allowances to all aged persons in need.

Various measures were also introduced during the SFIO's time in office to improve health and safety in the workplace. An Order of July 1947 prescribed the installation of showers for the use of staff "employed on dirty or unhealthy work" and a decree of August 1947 indicated the special precautions to be taken "to protect workers spraying paint or varnish". An Order of 10 September 1947 laid down the terms in which warnings must be given "of the dangers of benzene poisoning" while a circular of October 1947 indicated "how such poisoning can be prevented". In addition, a Decree of August 1947 instituted the original measures on health and safety committees.

During the years of the French Fourth Republic, the SFIO was also active in pressing for changes in areas such as education and agriculture. Through the efforts of the SFIO, a comprehensive Farm Law was passed in 1946 which provided that sharecroppers had the right to renew their options at the expiration of their leaseholds and that the owner could repossess the land only if he or his children worked it. In addition, sharecroppers could acquire ownership at low interest rates while those who were forced to leave the land obtained compensation for the improvements that they made on the land. The sharecroppers also had the right to join a marketing cooperative, while their conflicts with owners were to be resolved at arbitration tribunals to which both sides elected an equal number of representatives.

In the early years of the French Fourth Republic, the SFIO played an instrumental role in securing appropriations for 1,000 additional state elementary school teachers and in bringing in bills to extend the national laic school system to kindergarten and nursery school levels. During the spring of 1946, the SFIO reluctantly supported the constitutional plans of the PCF. They were rejected by a referendum. The party supported the second proposal prepared with the PCF and the MRP which was approved in an October 1946 referendum. However, the coalition split in May 1947. Because of the Cold War, the Communist ministers were excluded from the cabinet led by Socialist Paul Ramadier. Anti-communism prevented the French left from forming a united front. The Communists had taken control of the General Confederation of Labour (CGT) union. This was relatively weakened by the 1948 creation of a social-democratic trade union Workers' Force (FO) which was supported by the American Central Intelligence Agency. This split was led by former CGT secretary general Léon Jouhaux, who was granted the Nobel Peace Prize three years later. The teachers' union (Federation for National Education, FEN) chose to gain autonomy towards the two confederations in order to conserve its unity, but SFIO syndicalists took the control of the FEN which became the main training ground of the SFIO party.

A Third Force coalition was constituted by centre-right and centre-left parties, including the SFIO, in order to block the opposition of the Communists on the one hand, and of the Gaullists on the other. Besides, in spite of Léon Blum's support, the party leader Daniel Mayer was defeated in aid of Guy Mollet. If the new secretary general was supported by the left wing of the party, he was very hostile to any form of alliance with the PCF. He said that "the Communist Party is not on the Left but in the East". At the beginning of the 1950s, the disagreements with its governmental partners about denominational schools and the colonial problem explained a more critical attitude of the SFIO membership. In 1954, the party was deeply divided about the European Defense Community. Against the instructions of the party lead, the half of the parliamentary group voted against the project and contributed to its failure.

Progressively, the Algerian War of Independence became the major issue of the political debate. During the 1956 French legislative election campaign, the party took part in the Republican Front, a centre-left coalition led by Radical Pierre Mendès France, who advocated a peaceful resolution of the conflict. Guy Mollet took the lead of the cabinet, but he led a very repressive policy. After the May 1958 crisis, he supported the return of Charles de Gaulle and the establishment of the French Fifth Republic. Moreover, the SFIO was divided about the repressive policy of Guy Mollet in Algeria and his support to De Gaulle's return. If the party returned in opposition in 1959, it could not prevent the constitution of another Unified Socialist Party (PSU) in 1960, joined the next year by Pierre Mendès France, who was trying to anchor the Radical Party amongst the left-wing movement and opposed the colonial wars.

=== Decline ===
The SFIO received its lowest vote in the 1960s. It was discredited by the contradictory policies of its leaders during the Fourth Republic. Youth and the intellectual circles preferred the PSU and workers the PCF. The French Fifth Republic's constitution had been tailored by Charles de Gaulle to satisfy his needs and his Gaullism managed to gather enough people from the left and the right to govern without the other parties' help.

Furthermore, the SFIO hesitated between allying with the non-Gaullist centre-right (as advocated by Gaston Defferre) and reconciliation with the Communists. Mollet refused to choose. The SFIO supported François Mitterrand to the 1965 French presidential election even if he was not a member of the party. The SFIO and the Radicals then created the Federation of the Democratic and Socialist Left (FGDS), a centre-left coalition led by Mitterrand. It split after the May 68 events and the electoral disaster of June 1968. Defferre was the SFIO candidate in the 1969 French presidential election. He was eliminated in the first round, with only 5% of votes. One month later at the Issy-les-Moulineaux Congress, the SFIO was refounded as the modern-day Socialist Party. Mollet passed on the leadership to Alain Savary.

== African splits ==
The SFIO suffered a split in Senegal in 1934 as Lamine Guèye broke away and formed the Senegalese Socialist Party (PSS). As the Senegalese Popular Front committee as formed, the SFIO and the PSS branch cooperated. In 1937, a joint list of both the SFIO and the PSS won the municipal elections in Saint-Louis. Maître Vidal became mayor of the town. The congress of the PSS held 4–5 June 1938 decided to reunify with the SFIO. Following that decision, the 11–12 June 1938 congress of the new federation of SFIO was held in Thiès.

In 1948, Léopold Sédar Senghor broke away from the Senegalese federation of SFIO and formed the Senegalese Democratic Bloc (BDS). During the 1951 French legislative election campaign, violence broke out between BDS and SFIO activists. In the end, the BDS won both seats allocated to Senegal.

In 1956, another SFIO splinter group appeared in Senegal, the Socialist Movement of the Senegalese Union.

In 1957, the history of the SFIO in West Africa came to an end. The federations of SFIO in Cameroon, Chad, Moyen-Congo, Sudan, Gabon, Guinea, Niger, Oubangui-Chari and Senegal all met in Conakry from 11 January to 13 January 1957. At that meeting it was decided that the African federations would break with their French parent organisation and form the African Socialist Movement (MSA), an independent pan-African party. The Senegalese section of MSA was the Senegalese Party of Socialist Action (PSAS) and it was led by Lamine Guèye. The first meeting of the leading committee of MSA met in Dakar from 9 February to 10 February 1957 the same year. Two SFIO delegates attended the session.

== General secretaries ==
- Louis Dubreuilh (1905–1918)
- Ludovic-Oscar Frossard (1918–1920)
- Paul Faure (1920–1940)
- Daniel Mayer (1943–1946)
- Guy Mollet (1946–1969)

== Election results ==
=== Presidential elections ===
Presidency of the French Republic
Year	Candidate	1st round			2nd round		
Year	Candidate	Votes	%	Rank	Votes	%	Rank
1913	Édouard Vaillant	63	7.27	3rd	69	8.03	3rd
1920 (September)	Gustave Delory	69	8.78	2nd	—N/a	—N/a	—N/a
1932	Paul Faure	114	14.67	2nd	—N/a	—N/a	—N/a
1939	Albert Bedouce	151	16.70	2nd	—N/a	—N/a	—N/a
1947	Vincent Auriol	452	51.19	1st	—N/a	—N/a	—N/a
1953	Marcel-Edmond Naegelen	160	17.24	1st	329	37.77	2nd
1969	Gaston Defferre	1 133 222	5.01	4th	—N/a	—N/a	—N/a

=== Legislative elections ===
==== Chamber of Deputies ====
Chamber of Deputies
Year	No. of votes	% of vote	No. of seats	Change
1906	877,221	9.95	54 / 585	—N/a
1910	1,110,561	13.15	75 / 595	▲21
1914	1,413,044	16.76	103 / 595	▲27
1919	1,728,663	21.22	67 / 613	▼34
1924	1,814,000	20.10	104 / 581	▲36
1928	1,708,972	18.05	100 / 604	▼4
1932	1,964,384	20.51	132 / 607	▲32
1936	1,955,306	19.86	149 / 610	▲17

==== National Assembly ====
National Assembly
Year	No. of votes	% of vote	No. of seats	Change
1945	4,561,411	23.8	134 / 522	Steady
1946 (June)	4,187,747	21.1	128 / 586	▼6
1946 (November)	3,433,901	17.9	102 / 627	▼26
1951	2,894,001	15.4	107 / 625	▲5
1956	3,247,431	15.3	95 / 595	▼12
Year	No. of 1st round votes	% of 1st round vote	No. of seats	Change
1958	3,167,354	15.5	40 / 576	▼55
1962	2,298,729	12.5	65 / 491	▲18
1967	4,224,110 (in the FGDS)	19.0	114 / 491	—N/a
1968	3,660,250 (in the FGDS)	16.5	57 / 487	▼57

== See also ==
- French Left
- History of socialism
- L'A. O. F.
- Tunis-Socialiste
