= Independent Socialist Republican Party =

Political party in Senegal

- Leader: Blaise Diagne
- Founded: 1919
- Ideology: Socialism; African nationalism
- Political position: Left-wing

Independent Socialist Republican Party (in French: Parti Républicain Socialiste Indépendant) was a political party in Senegal, formed in 1919 by Blaise Diagne.

In the December 21, 28 1919 municipal elections the multiracial lists of PRSI won in all four municipalities.
