= Senegalese Communist Party =

Political party in Senegal

- Chairman: Landing Savané
- Founded: 1965
- Ideology: Communism; Marxism–Leninism; Maoism
- Political position: Left-wing

The Senegalese Communist Party (French: Parti Communiste Sénégalais) was a pro-China communist party in Senegal. It was formed by the then student leader Landing Savané in 1965. The party was short-lived, but Savané continued his political activity through other groups.

== See also ==
- List of anti-revisionist groups
