= African Independence Party – Renewal =

African Independence Party - Renewal
- Leader: Majhemout Diop
- Founded: 1976
- Headquarters: Guédiawaye
- Newspaper: Momsarev
- Ideology: Communism

Party flag
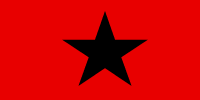

African Independence Party (in French: Parti Africain de l'Indépendance) is a political party in Senegal, which was led by Majhmoud Diop.

At the 1972 congress of the original African Independence Party in Senegal, the former general secretary, Majhmoud Diop, was expelled. In 1976, in the context of rapprochement from the side of the government, Diop was welcomed to return from exile. Rapidly he gathered his followers and formed a 'Provisional Committee for Renewal of PAI'. Amongst his aides were Baba Ndiaye and Bara Goudiaby. Effectively this group started function as a separate party, calling itself PAI. Generally it became known as PAI-Rénovation (Renewal), distinguishing it from the original PAI (which was called PAI-Sénégal).

== Background ==
In an attempt to move away from the one-party system, the National Assembly of Senegal adopted a law on July 9, 1975, which would give way to a three party system. The law identified that three distinct ideological tendencies would be represented in the political life of the country: liberal and democratic, socialist and democratic and Marxist-Leninist. The governing UPS was accorded the role as the Social Democratic party and the main opposition PDS was legalized to take the role as the liberal democratic party.

On August 14, 1976, PAI-Rénovation was registered as a legal political party under the name 'PAI'. It was recognized to take the role of the legal left in the three party system. (PAI-Sénégal was later (in 1981, after the abolition of the three party system) registered as Party of Independence and Work (PIT).)

In the 1978 elections PAI of Diop came third with 3734 votes (0.3% of the total vote).

In 1979 PAI of Diop was joined by a tendency of LD led by Moussa Kane.

PAI published the party newspaper Momsarev.
