= Senegalese Democratic Bloc =

Political party in Senegal

Senegalese Democratic Bloc (in French: Bloc Démocratique Sénégalais) was a political party in Senegal, founded on 27 October 1948 by Léopold Sédar Senghor, following a split from the French Section of the Workers' International (SFIO). One month after the split from SFIO, Senghor associated himself with the Indépendants d'Outre-Mer parliamentary fraction.

The BDS united the uniting the Union Générale des Originaires du Fleuve, the Mouvement des Forces Démocratiques de Casamance, and the Association des Toucouleurs du Fouta Toro.

In the 1951 legislative elections BDS got 213 182 votes (67% of the votes cast in Senegal). Two BDS members are elected MPs, Senghor and Abbas Gueye (a local CGT leader). The electoral campaign was marred by violence between BDS and SFIO.

BDS relied heavily on religious and tribal authorities to spread their influence. The combination of the capability to gather many different ethnic group and Senghor's personal charisma ensured BDS predominance in Senegalese pre-Independence politics.

In 1956 BDS won the municipal elections in Kaolack, Thiès, Louga, Diourbel and Ziguinchor. BDS lost in Dakar.

On 18 August 1956 BDS held its last plenary meeting. That meeting paved the way for the merger of BDS with the Senegalese Democratic Union (UDS), Casamance Autonomist Movement (MAC) and a fraction of the Senegalese Popular Movement (MPS) led by Abdolaye Thiaw. The result of the merger was the creation of the Senegalese Popular Bloc (BPS).
