= Amadou Lamine-Guèye =

Senegalese politician (1891–1968)

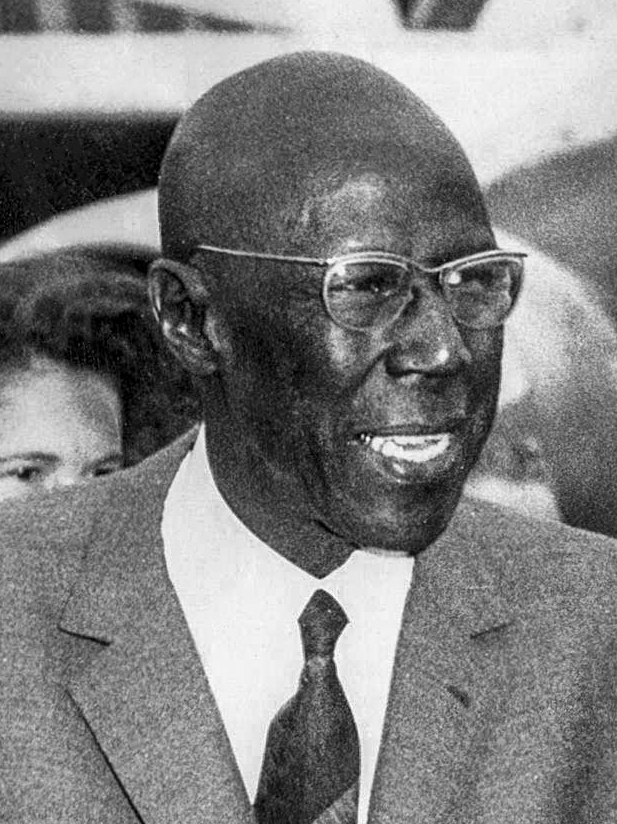
- Guèye in 1965

1st President of the National Assembly of Senegal
- In office 1960 – 10 June 1968
- Preceded by: Position established
- Succeeded by: Amadou Cissé Dia

Senator of France
- In office 8 June 1958 – 15 July 1959

Member of the National Assembly
- In office 10 November 1946 – 4 July 1951 Serving with Léopold Senghor
- Preceded by: Position re-established Ngalandou Diouf (1940)
- Constituency: Senegal

Personal details
- Born: 20 September 1891 Médine, French Sudan (now Mali)
- Died: 10 June 1968 (aged 76) Dakar, Senegal
- Party: Senegalese Party of Socialist Action
- Other political affiliations: French Section of the Workers' International
- Relatives: Lamine Guèye (grandson)
- Profession: Lawyer and politician

Amadou Lamine-Guèye (20 September 1891 – 10 June 1968) was a Senegalese politician who was the first President of the National Assembly of Senegal from 1960 until his death in 1968. The leader of the Senegalese Party of Socialist Action and a member of the French Section of the Workers' International, he was also a member of the French National Assembly from Senegal between 1946 and 1951, serving alongside associate Léopold Sédar Senghor. He was additionally a member of the Senate from 1958 to 1959.

He gave his name to the 1946 Lamine Guèye law (Loi Lamine Guèye) which granted French citizenship to all inhabitants of France's overseas colonies.

== Early life ==
Amadou Lamine-Guèye was born in Médine, in French Sudan (now part of Mali) on 20 September 1891. He was educated in France, where he graduated as a lawyer in 1921. He was the grandson of Bacre Waly Gueye, a prominent merchant and political figure in 19th-century Saint-Louis, Senegal, who was the first African member of the General Council and a recipient of the Légion d'honneur. He was the first African with a doctorate in French law.

== Political career ==
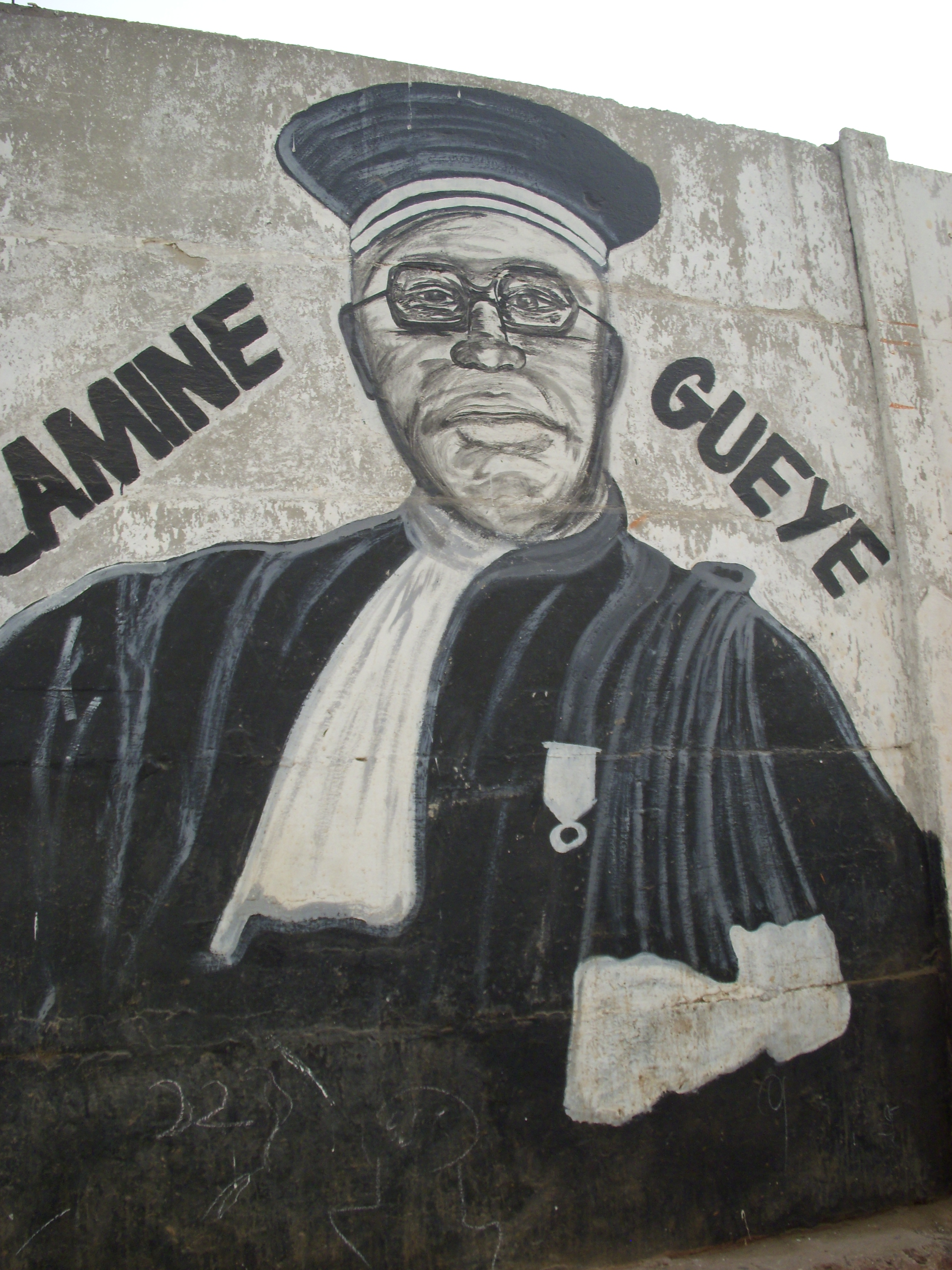
Mural of Lamine-Guèye in Dakar, Senegal

Upon his return to Africa, Guèye founded a political party and became mayor of Saint-Louis, Senegal, in 1924.

He became leader of the French Section of the Workers' International in Senegal in 1937, and was elected as one of two Senegalese representatives to the National Assembly alongside Léopold Senghor in 1944. He was elected once again the following year, and also became mayor of Dakar. Guèye pursued what would become known as the Lamine Guèye law (Loi Lamine Guèye), which sought to give equal rights to all natives of French overseas territories. This was enacted on 7 May 1946.

Lamine-Guèye was an advocate for Senegalese assimilation with France. He was antifascist and pro-women's rights.

Guèye lost his seat in the Assembly in 1951 elections after Senghor left to form his own party. Guèye reconciled with Senghor, and was once again elected in 1958. A year later, he was elected as the first President of the independent National Assembly of Senegal.

== Death ==
He died in Dakar on 10 June 1968. At the time, he was the President of the National Assembly.

== Family and private life ==
He was the grandfather of Senegalese alpine skier Lamine Guèye.

== See also ==
- List of mayors of Dakar
- Timeline of Dakar
