= 2012 Senegalese presidential election =

- 26 February 2012 (first round); 25 March 2012 (second round)
- Turnout: 51.58% (first round); 55.00% (second round)
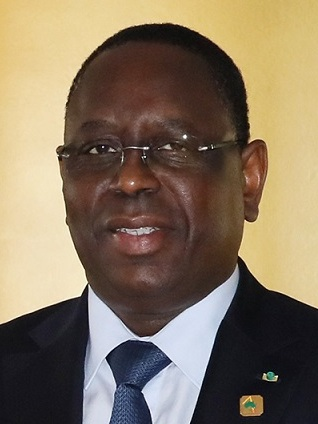

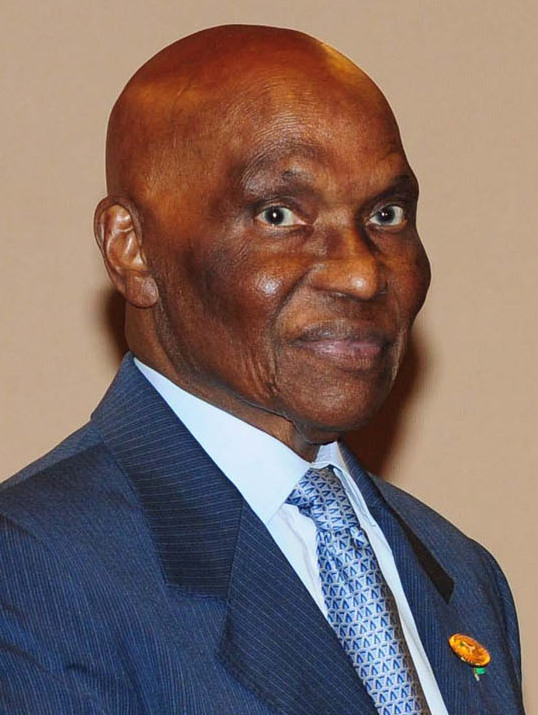
Candidate	Macky Sall	Abdoulaye Wade
Party	APR	PDS
Popular vote	1,909,244	992,556
Percentage	65.80%	34.20%
- Results by region Sall: 50-60% 60-70% 70-80% Wade: 50-60% 60-70%
President before election
Abdoulaye Wade
PDS
Elected President
Macky Sall
APR

Presidential elections were held in Senegal on 26 February 2012, amidst controversy over the constitutional validity of a third term for incumbent president Abdoulaye Wade. In the runoff on 25 March, Macky Sall defeated the incumbent president. The 2015 documentary film Incorruptible chronicles both campaigns as well as the youth movement Y'en a Marre, which led protests against Wade's administration.

== Background ==
In July 2008, the National Assembly approved a constitutional amendment increasing the length of the presidential term to seven years, as it was prior to the adoption of the 2001 constitution. This extension didn't apply to Abdoulaye Wade's 2007–2012 term, but Minister of Justice Madické Niang stressed on this occasion that Wade could potentially run for re-election in 2012 if he was still healthy.

The 26 February 2012 date for the election was decreed by President of Senegal Abdoulaye Wade on 23 November 2010. President Wade indicated that he would stand for his third term, set at seven years by the constitution. While the 2001 constitution limits a president to two terms, Wade argued that his 2000 election to his first seven-year term falls under the previous constitution, which did not provide for term limits.

=== 2010–2011 protests and violence ===
In April 2010, Wade came under fire for unveiling the African Renaissance Monument, a monument that was deemed too expensive. It was also criticised by religious leaders for the immodest attire of the women in the monument. While there was domestic criticism, the United States' Jesse Jackson and Malawian President Bingu wa Mutharika praised Wade's representation of Africa. Similarly, North Korea, who contributed to the construction of the monument in exchange for a tract of land, congratulated Wade.

In December 2010, Senegalese troops engaged and repulsed 100 MFDC rebels after they attacked Bignona, Casamance. In February 2011, the Senegalese government cut ties with Iran, later alleging that forensic analysis of bullets obtained from rebels revealed that the Iranian government had supplied them.

On 18 February 2011, Oumar Bocoum, a soldier, used gasoline to set himself on fire outside the presidential palace in Dakar, following a pattern of protest used throughout the Middle East.

In June, after violent protests, Wade dropped plans for two constitutional changes: lowering the percentage of votes required for a first-round victory from 50% to 25% and creating the position of vice-president, also to be elected. Critics feared that Wade would use this to ensure his re-election against a split opposition, and to make his son vice-president. In response to a protest planned for 23 July, a ban on protesting in Dakar was laid down on 21 July 2011; the protesters in response moved the planned protest outside the city.

=== Constitutional Court term limit ruling ===
On 27 January 2012, the Constitutional Court of Senegal ruled that Wade was allowed to run for a third term – according to the ruling, his first term did not count under the new constitution.

Protests erupted the following day. Buildings burned across the capital Dakar. Police fired tear gas at youth protesters who questioned the ruling. Wade made a television appearance in which he called the protests "displays of petulance" and promised an "open" electoral campaign with "no restrictions on freedom." Protesters said that they would turn the Place de l'Obelisque in central Dakar into the country's version of Tahrir Square, the focal point of the 2011 Egyptian revolution which led to the ouster of Egyptian President Hosni Mubarak.

Head of the Party of Independence and Labour and member of the M23 opposition activist group Amath Dansokho told reporters, "Abdoulaye Wade has declared war on the people". Truckloads of police in full riot gear and armed with tear gas grenade launchers and truncheons surrounded the presidential palace used by Wade. Leading human rights activist Alioune Tine was detained.

The protests continued into February. Riot police fired volleys of tear gas and rubber bullets in Dakar on 19 February 2012, one week before the election.

The protests finally ended when Sall defeated Wade in the runoff election.

== Candidates ==
In addition to the fourteen eventual candidates, Bruno d'Erneville, President of Programme Action Citoyenne Totale, musician Youssou N'Dour, Abdourahmane Sarr and Kéba Keinde intended to run in the election as independents. In January 2012, Bruno d'Erneville formed an alliance with Ibrahima Fall and withdrew. The other three intended candidates were barred from running in the election over insufficiency of legitimate signatures to endorse their campaigns.

Candidate	Party	2007 result
Ousmane Tanor Dieng	Socialist Party of Senegal	Ousmane Tanor Dieng (PS); 13.56%
Moustapha Niasse	United to Boost Senegal; Alliance of the Forces of Progress	Moustapha Niasse (AFP); 5.93%
Macky Sall	Alliance for the Republic – Yakaar	supported Abdoulaye Wade
Idrissa Seck	Rewmi	Idrissa Seck (Rewmi); 14.92%
Abdoulaye Wade	Senegalese Democratic Party	Abdoulaye Wade (PDS); 55.90%
Mor Dieng	fr:YAAKAAR, le Parti de l'Espoir	
Cheikh Tidiane Gadio	Citizen Political Movement	supported Abdoulaye Wade
Cheikh Bamba Dièye	Front for Socialism and Democracy/Benno Jubël	fr:Cheikh Bamba Dièye (FSD/BJ); 0.50%
Doudou Ndoye	Union for the Republic	Doudou Ndoye (UPR); 0.29%
Djibril Ngom	Independent	
Ibrahima Fall	Independent	
Diouma Dieng Diakhaté	fr:Parti Initiative démocratique jogal	
Oumar Khassimou Dia	fr:Parti humaniste Naxx Jarinu	
Amsatou Sow Sidibé	fr:CAR Lennen	

== Campaign ==
For the second round Sall called on all other losing candidates and N'Dour to support him on the promise of returning to five-year terms from the previous seven-year term that Wade controversially restored; he also said he would ensure that no leader could hold more than two terms.

== Results ==
Following a review of the Constitutional Council's official result for the first round, Wade had 34.8% of the votes with Sall forcing a runoff after getting 26.5% of the votes; Moustapha Niasse was in third place with 13.2%, Ousmane Tanor Dieng was in fourth place with 11.3%, and Idrissa Seck followed with 7.86%.

A run-off was held on 25 March between Wade and Sall with Sall winning the presidency. Notably, Wade lost by a big margin in his own constituency of Point-E. The election commission warned both candidates not to prematurely declare victory. Voting occurred without undue incidents.

Candidate	Party	First round		Second round	
Candidate	Party	Votes	%	Votes	%
Abdoulaye Wade	Senegalese Democratic Party	942,327	34.81	992,556	34.20
Macky Sall	Alliance for the Republic	719,367	26.58	1,909,244	65.80
Moustapha Niasse	Alliance of the Forces of Progress	357,330	13.20		
Ousmane Tanor Dieng	Socialist Party	305,924	11.30		
Idrissa Seck	Rewmi	212,853	7.86		
Cheikh Bamba Dièye	Front for Socialism and Democracy/Benno Jubël	52,196	1.93		
Ibrahima Fall	Independent	48,972	1.81		
Cheikh Tidiane Gadio	Citizen Political Movement	26,655	0.98		
Mor Dieng	Party of Hope	11,402	0.42		
Djibril Ngom	Independent	10,207	0.38		
Oumar Khassimou Dia	Humanist Party Ñaxx Jariñu	6,469	0.24		
Amsatou Sow Sidibé	Party for Democracy and Citizenship	5,167	0.19		
Doudou Ndoye	Union for the Republic	4,566	0.17		
Diouma Dieng Diakhaté	Jogal Democratic Initiative Party	3,354	0.12		
Total		2,706,789	100.00	2,901,800	100.00
Valid votes		2,706,789	98.96	2,901,800	99.52
Invalid/blank votes		28,346	1.04	14,093	0.48
Total votes		2,735,135	100.00	2,915,893	100.00
Registered voters/turnout		5,302,349	51.58	5,307,962	54.93
Source: Direction Générale des Élections

== Reactions ==
After the second round, Wade announced the preliminary result and congratulated Sall. "My dear compatriots, at the end of the second round of the vote...the current results indicate that Macky Sall has won." His spokesman Amadou Sall said: "It is the whole country that has just won ... This is a big moment for democracy and President Abdoulaye Wade has respected the voice of the people." Thousands of Sall's supporters then celebrated on the streets of Dakar and outside the winning party's headquarters. The Senegalese Press Agency said that Wade called Sall at 21:30 to congratulate him. Sall said he would be a president for all the Senegalese people and the election marked a "new era." Wade's presidential spokesman Serigne Mbacke Ndiaye issued a statement that read: "On this day...at 9:27 p.m., President Abdoulaye Wade...wish[ed Sall] good luck in his mission at the head of Senegal in the hopes that he will render the Senegalese happy. In this way, Senegal, through a transparent election, has once again proven that she remains a great democracy – a great country."

International reactions included:

- The African Union said Wade's concession was a show of "maturity." The Commission's chairman Jean Ping said the peaceful conduct of the election "proved that Africa, despite its challenges, continues to register significant progress towards democracy and transparent elections."
- European Union – A spokesman for Catherine Ashton said the election was "a great victory for democracy in Senegal and in Africa. Senegal is a great example for Africa."
- United Nations – The UN praised and welcomed Wade's concession speech.
- France – President Nicolas Sarkozy said the election was "good news for Africa in general and for Senegal in particular. Senegal is a major African country and a model of democracy."
- United States – The White House also praised and welcomed Wade's concession speech.

== Government formation ==
After being sworn in on 2 April, Sall appointed Abdoul Mbaye as prime minister. Sall said that as "we aren't able to do everything. I haven't promised to do everything," his focus would be on poverty alleviation and development. This was boosted by the union of university professors suspending a strike to allow the new government to review its demands.

== Bibliography ==
- "President Takes Office." Africa Research Bulletin: Political, Social and Cultural Series, 2012, 49: 19230C–19231B.
- Jean-Philippe Dedieu, Lisa Chauvet, Flore Gubert, Sandrine Mesplé-Somps, Etienne Smith. "The 'Battles' of Paris and New York. An Analysis of Transnational Electoral Behaviour among Senegalese Migrants in France and the United States." Revue française de science politique, 2013, 63(5): 53–80.
- Alpha Amadou Sy, Les élections présidentielles au Sénégal de mars 2012 : le triomphe de la volonté populaire, Paris, L'Harmattan, 2013.
- Union européenne. Mission d'observation électorale, Bruxelles, Union Européenne, 2012.
