= Global High-Level Panel on Water and Peace =

The Global High-Level Panel on Water and Peace was created in 2015 in Geneva at the initiative of 15 co-convening UN Member States to analyse water in the context of maintaining peace and security and to move this issue from a technical to a political level. Chaired by Dr. Danilo Türk, the former President of the Republic of Slovenia, the Panel presented its landmark report, A Matter of Survival, in Geneva in 2017. The Geneva Water Hub, acted as Secretariat to the Panel. The Strategic Foresight Group was the main intellectual partner of the Panel.

== Work of The Panel ==
The High Level Panel on Water and Peace focused on the nexus between water and co-operation and how this maintains peace and security. This included preventive activities and arrangements, such as trans-border water cooperation regimes and institutions, the protection of water infrastructure during armed conflicts and water arrangements in the context of post-conflict peace-building.

Over a period of two years the Panel held consultations and public hearings with all relevant organisations and stakeholders to:

- Develop a set of proposals aimed at strengthening the global architecture to prevent and resolve water-related conflicts;
- Facilitate the role of water as an important factor of building peace and cooperation; and
- Enhance the relevance of water issues in national and global policy making.

== List of Panelists ==
=== Chair ===
- Dr. Danilo Türk, former President of the Republic, Slovenia

=== Vice Chairs ===
- Mr. Mansour Faye, Minister of Water and Hydraulics, Senegal
- Dr. Alvaro Umaña Quesada, former Minister of Energy and Environment, Costa Rica

=== Members (by order of nomination by co-convening country) ===
- Prof. Laurence Boisson de Chazournes, Professor of Law at University of Geneva, Switzerland
- Dr. Claudia Patricia Mora, former Vice Minister for Water and Sanitation, Colombia
- Dr. Pascual Fernández, former State Secretary for Water and Seashore, Spain
- Prof. Andras Szöllösi-Nagy, former Rector of UNESCO-IHE Institute for Water Education, Hungary
- His Royal Highness Prince Hassan bin Talal, Jordan
- Mr. Yerlan Nysanbayev, Vice-Minister of Ministry of Agriculture, Kazakhstan
- Mr. Mike Allen Hammah, former Minister for Lands and Natural Resources, Ghana
- Mr. Ciarán Ó Cuinn, Director of Middle East Desalination Research Centre, Oman
- Mr. Andres Tarand, former Prime Minister, Estonia
- Mr. Thor Chetha, Secretary of State of Ministry of Water Resources and Meteorology, Cambodia (acting on an interim basis, nominee to be announced)
- Mr. Franck Galland, managing director of Environmental Emergency & Security Services, France
- Mr. Abdelaaziz Ameziane, General Engineer, Ministry of Water, Morocco

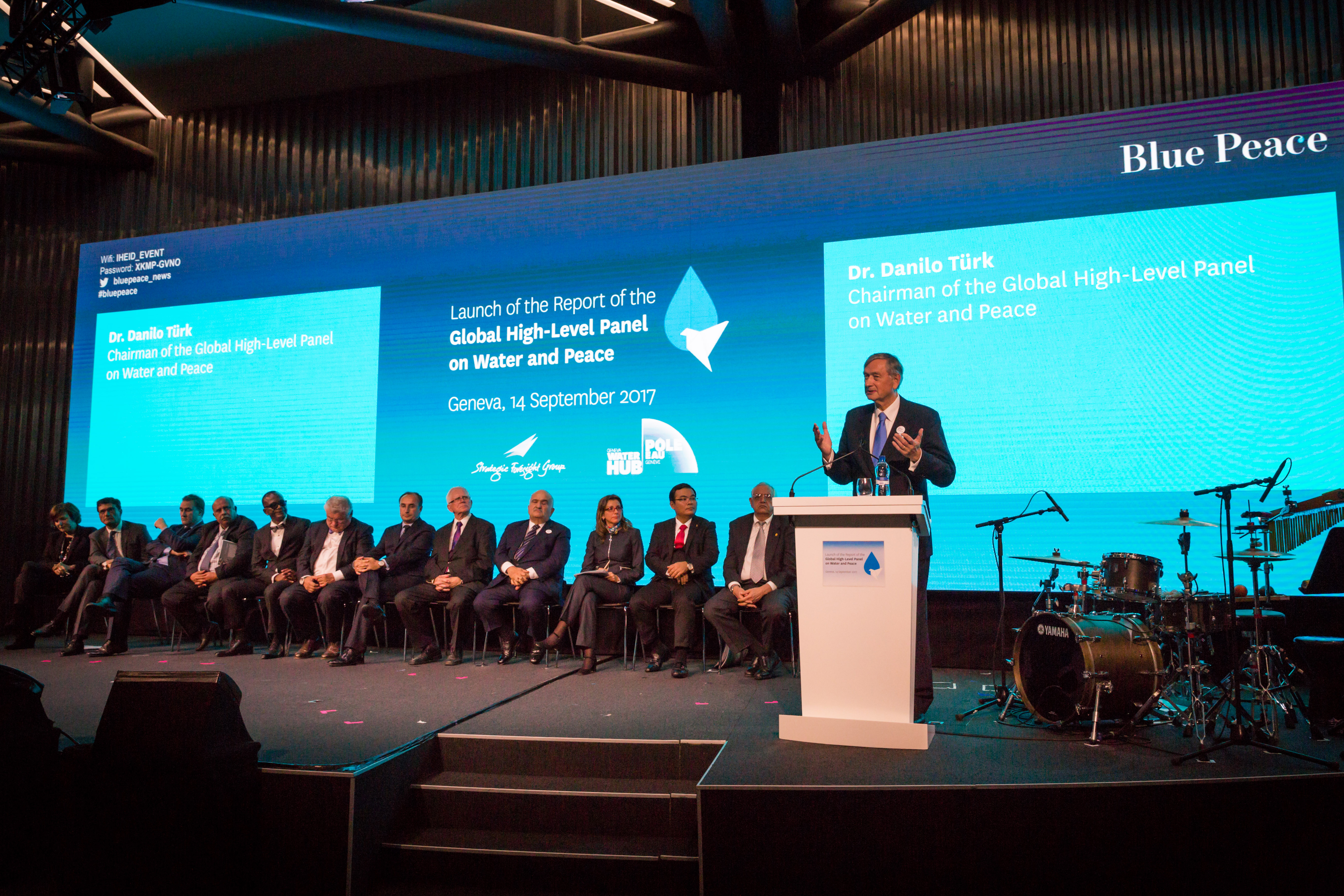
Global High-Level Panel on Water and Peace during the launch of the Report “A Matter of Survival” in September 2017

== Group of Friends on Water and Peace ==
In response to the high interest generated by The High Level Panel on Water and Peace, a Group of Friends on Water and Peace was created in early 2016. It provides participating countries with the opportunity to interact with the work of the Panel and offers them a platform for regular dialogue on the issues and recommendations in A Matter of Survival.
