= Awa Ndiaye-Seck =

- Citizenship: Senegalese
- Education: Université Cheikh Anta Diop de Dakar (Law), The Economics Institute (Certificate in Economics), Southern Illinois University (MBA)
- Occupations: UN Representative, diplomat
- Organization(s): UN Women, UNDP, USAID
- Title: United Nations Resident Representative in the Democratic Republic of Congo, Special Representative of the Executive Director on AWLN

Awa Ndiaye-Seck is a Senegalese national who serves as the United Nations Resident Representative in the Democratic Republic of Congo and Special Representative of the Executive Director on AWLN (African Women Leaders Network) at UN Women. Awa has previously worked with the United Nations Development Programme (UNDP) and also served in the United States Agency for International Development (USAID) in various capacities.

== Background and education ==
Awa Ndiaye-Seck was born in Senegal. Ndiaye went to Université Cheikh Anta Diop de Dakar (UCAD) for law school and graduated in 1987. Later, Ndaiye attained a certificate in Economics, Business Administration and Management, General in 1994 from The Economics Institute, Boulder, Colorado. She then attained a Masters Degree of Business Administration from Southern Illinois University, Carbondale in 1997. She also holds a Human Rights Certificate from the College Henri Dunant, Summer School.

== Career ==
Awa Ndiaye-Seck started out as a public officer with the Ministry and Local Governments Unit in Senegal between 1980 and 2000. She then worked as the Director Training and Communication at the General Direction of Election in the Ministry of Internal Affairs, Senegal for two years. Ndiaye was the Decentralization and Local Governance Expert at the Associates in Rural Development, Incorporation /USAID from 2000 to 2004. Ndiaye then worked as the Chad Governance Advisor for the United States Agency for International Development between 2005 and 2007. Ndiaye was the Burundi Governance Advisor - Head of Decentralization and Local Governance Unit for the United Nations up to 2009 before being appointed as the Senior Gender Advisor for the United States Agency for International Development in Burundi for two years. Ndiaye was then posted by the UNDP to Ethiopia as the Crisis Prevention and Recovery Regional Practice Coordinator. Ndiaye then joined UN Women and has served in various roles since joining the Organization. She first served as the Liberia Resident Representative from 2014 to 2017. Ndiaye was then posted to Ivory Coast as the acting Resident Representative, a role she held for a year. In 2017, she was appointed the Resident Representative for the Democratic Republic of the Congo, a position she hold to date. In 2019, She was appointed the Special Representative of the UN Women Executive Director on African Women Leaders Network (AWLN) a role she holds to date.

== See also ==
- United States Agency for International Development
- UN Women
