= Daouda Sembene =

CEO of AfriCatalyst

Former Executive Director at the International Monetary Fund (IMF)

Personal details
- Education: PhD
- Alma mater: American University in Washington, George Washington University,University of Montreal & University of Dakar
- Occupation: Economist
- Profession: Economist

Daouda Sembene is a Senegalese economist and development expert, and the CEO of AfriCatalyst, a global development advisory firm based in Dakar, Senegal.

== Education ==
Sembene holds a PhD in Development Economics from American University in Washington, D.C. He also earned master's degrees from George Washington University, the University of Montreal, and the University of Dakar.

== Career ==
Sembene has held prominent positions in both international organizations and the Senegalese government. As a former executive director at the International Monetary Fund (IMF), he represented 23 African countries on the IMF's executive board. In this capacity, he chaired a committee focused on strengthening partnerships between the IMF and major global institutions such as the World Bank, the United Nations, and the World Trade Organization.

In Senegal, Sembene was a senior economic advisor to President of Senegal, contributing to the development of national economic policies. He also held a senior advisory role at the Ministry of Economy, Finance, and Planning, where he represented Senegal at the IMF and World Bank as an Alternate Governor. In 2022, he was appointed special advisor on food security by the African Union Chairperson.

Earlier in his career, Sembene worked at the World Bank in Washington, D.C., focusing on macroeconomic management. He has testified on economic matters before the U.S. Congress and African legislative bodies.

== Selected publications ==
Eminent experts on issues related to state fragility. This work explores effective ways to help rebuild fragile and conflict-affected countries (2020–2021)

A piece underscoring a few ways IFIs and MDBs can support pandemic RecoveryPlan in Africa: Get the financing numbers right; Walk the talk; Think and act outside (2020)

Co-authored with Hannah Brown on the sector in Africa (2021) Financing opportunities and challenges for the informal Co-authored a piece with Jack Rossitter on how Can the World Pay for Schooling for All? (2022)
