= School of Librarians, Archivists, and Documentalists =

Library school in Senegal

- École de bibliothécaires, archivistes et documentalistes
- Established: 1962
- Parent institution: Cheikh Anta Diop University
- Affiliations: Ministry of Higher Education
- Location: Dakar, Senegal
- Website: ebad.ucad.sn

The School of Librarians, Archivists, and Documentalists (EBAD) is an institute founded in Dakar, Senegal. It is part of Cheikh Anta Diop University and operates under the authority of the Ministry of Higher Education of Senegal. Established in 1962 as the Regional Training Center for Librarians (CRFB), it was renamed in 1967 by decree No. 67-1235 on 15 November 1967 to the School of Librarians, Archivists, and Documentalists.

Since its inception, it has trained information science professionals from Senegal, the sub-region, and across Africa.

== History ==
The decree of 15 November 1967 granted EBAD the status of a university institute.

Its creation resulted from a series of meetings. The first took place in Ibadan, Nigeria, in 1953, where the need for professional training tailored to African libraries was first mentioned. The second meeting occurred in 1961 in Addis Ababa, Ethiopia, where UNESCO emphasized the creation of regional and national training centers. On 28 March 1962, a Regional Training Center for French-speaking Librarians, the precursor to EBAD, was established in Senegal. In 1967, decree No. 67-1235 on 15 November 1967 renamed the CRFB to the School of Librarians, Archivists, and Documentalists.

The young school's mission was to:

- Train and improve the technical management and administration staff of documentary information services in French-speaking African countries;
- Promote and develop fundamental and applied research in information and communication sciences.

== Education ==
Admission to EBAD for locals is through a competitive exam after obtaining the baccalauréat. Foreign students' applications are accepted through a dossier review. From its establishment until 2004, the school offered a two-cycle program:

- First cycle: This two-year program trained mid-level managers to perform technical tasks in documentary units. The first cycle offered training in three sections: Libraries established in 1969, Archives established in 1971, and Documentation in the same year as the Archives section.
- Second cycle: Admitted students had to have either the first-cycle diploma from EBAD with three years of professional experience or a bachelor's degree. The second-cycle training, established in 1983, is conducted in-person. In 2000, a project named FORCIIR enabled distance learning via the internet for the second cycle.

In 2005, the LMD system was introduced, leading to the creation of the bachelor, master, and doctoral programs in information science. The bachelor's degree covers three sections over three years (six semesters). Selected students (the top five from each section) proceed to a two-year master's program (four semesters). The master's program offers three specializations: Documentary Engineering, Information Technology, and Heritage Documentation. The master's program is also available via distance learning.

EBAD also offers continuing education programs.

== Organization and staff ==
EBAD's administration consists of a director, a director of studies, and a chief of administrative services. The rest of the staff includes permanent and visiting teachers and administrative personnel.

== Directors ==
- Mouhamadou Moustapha Mbengue: from August 2018 to present
- Mamadou Diarra: from 2012 to 2018
- Ibrahima LÔ: 2006 – 2012
- Mbaye Thiam: 1996 – 2006
- Ousmane Sané: 1987 – 1996
- Henri Sène: 1981–1987
- Amadou Alassane Bousso: 1967–1981

== See also ==
- Libraries in Senegal
- Senegalese Association of Librarians, Archivist, and Documentation Professionals (ASBAD)
