= June 23 Movement in Senegal =

The June 23rd Movement (French: Mouvement du 23 Juin) was a grassroots group formed in Senegal in 2011 to oppose President Abdoulaye Wade's bid for a third term and proposed constitutional changes, viewed as threatening democracy. The mobilization brought together opposition parties, trade unions, youth movements, such as "Y'en a Marre", human rights organizations, such as "Rencontre Africaine de Défense des Droits de l'Homme" (RADDHO), religious figures and ordinary citizens. On the day of the legislative vote, June 23rd 2011, his attempt at a third term was thwarted by protests in front of the National Assembly. However, the 2012 presidential race went ahead with Wade still on the ballot, even as there was ongoing mobilization against his presidency. In the first round, he got the most votes, but it wasn't sufficient to win outright, leading to a second round where opposition parties and protest leaders supported Macky Sall, the opposing candidate. In March, Sall won the presidency, and Wade stepped down peacefully.

== Background ==
=== Political context under Abdoulaye Wade ===
Abdoulaye Wade, the head of the Parti Démocratique Sénégalais (PDS), defeated opponent Abdou Diouf of the Parti Socialiste (PS) in the second round of the 2000 presidential election. This event was widely interpreted as a historic "Alternance" in power. This brought an end to roughly four decades of Socialist Party rule and appeared to confirm Senegal's image as a civilian-led country that avoided coups since independence. Wade drew on the legacy of Léopold Sédar Senghor, cultivating relations with marabouts and the Mouride brotherhood and presenting himself as the natural successor to Senghor's blend of "African Socialism" and religious pluralism, while promising Sopi (Wolof for "change") and better living conditions for the population.

Over time, however, the optimism tied to the 2000 transition led to growing uncertainty about how power was being exercised under Wade. Studies pointed to more constraints on the press, the sidelining of parties that were initially allies of the PDS, a justice system perceived as vulnerable to political interference, and overall expansion of presidential authority that would undermine fair democratic rule. The 2001 Constitutional reform that reduced the presidential term from seven to five years was reversed in 2008, restoring the previous term limit of seven years, signaling a reassertion of the executive. Some observers argued that Senegal under Wade more closely resembled a "competitive authoritarian" regime, in which rules were regularly violated for his own gain.

Wade stayed electorally strong in the first half of his presidency, with about 56% of the vote in 2007. That is because, institutionally, Wade used his constitutional powers to consolidate control over key bodies of the state. He appointed loyalists to the Constitutional Court so that it wouldn't hinder on his presidency, which, later on, during the 2012 presidential race, the Court's decision to validate Wade's candidacy was allowed under the constitution. However, this was largely viewed by critics as the outcome of corrupted members. Similarly, he also appointed political allies to revitalized institutions such as the Senate and the "Economic and Social Council", using benefits to attract them into the presidential coalition. During his first decade in office, the number of registered parties tripled which is often linked to this new expansion in patronage. Legislative elections originally planned for 2006 were postponed twice and eventually held after the 2007 presidential poll, while the local elections that were due for 2008, were pushed to 2009. Observers interpreted these repeated delays as strategic moves designed to maintain an upper hand on presidential rivals, calling it a "crisis of confidence" stemming from the opposition.

=== Socio-economic context under Abdoulaye Wade ===
Support for Wade eroded during his second term in office, as public confidence in his legitimacy fell sharply: by mid-2008, over 33% of respondents in the Afrobarometer survey indicated trusting him "not at all". Rising urban youth unemployment, clandestine migration, electricity outages, and flooding in suburban areas built up frustration, further aggravated by the global food and fuel crises of 2007–2008. Poverty was reported to stagnate at roughly 47% according to the IMF. At the same time, Wade pursued the construction of highly controversial Monument de la Renaissance Africaine in Dakar, costing around $28 million, which sparked public protest over both its expense and his claimed share of visitor revenue.

These socio-economic pressures fueled mobilization and civic activism. Food price spikes led to protests in 2008, while power outages sparked riots against Senelec offices in 2008 and 2011, which also fed into the broader June 23 Movement. Citizen movements were also perceived to have blossomed under Wade's presidency with, notably, groups like Mouvement Citoyen, Bes Du Ñak/Mouvement citoyen pour la Refondation Nationale, Y'en a Marre, and many others. These groups led to increased social and democratic awareness with a spike in public preference for democracy between 2002 and 2008.

The agricultural sector employs a large share of Senegal's population, so dependence on rain-fed farming and the decline of the peanut sector led to mass youth unemployment and pushed many rural farmers into poverty. Considering that the 2011 drought left around 800,000 people food-insecure and about one-quarter of Senegalese chronically malnourished. Major infrastructure projects initiatives led by Wade and his son Karim, focused primarily on Dakar, leaving rural areas underserved. Meanwhile, youth underemployment remained high, informal jobs predominated and nepotism hindered access to the formal labor market, fueling participation in grassroots movements to change the status quo, such as June 23 Movement and Y'en a Marre.

Senegal fell sharply in the Transparency International Corruption Perceptions Index, ranking 112th out of 182 countries by 2011.

=== Voting process and constitutional amendments ===
Senegalese presidential elections follow a two-round system, similar to France: if no candidate receives over 50% of votes in the first round, the top two contenders proceed to a runoff. In June 2011, President Wade proposed controversial constitutional amendments that would have lowered the threshold to win in the first round, from 50% to 25% and established a jointly elected vice-president, a move widely perceived as benefiting his son Karim, his potential successor. The proposals provoked mass protests, culminating in the June 23 demonstrations organized by the M23 movement, leading Wade to withdraw both measures. Despite this, Wade pursued a third-term bid for the 2012 elections, arguing that the two-term limit in the 2001 Constitution did not apply to his first term (2000–2007). Senegal's Constitutional Council ruled his candidacy legal in January 2012, sparking renewed protests and criticism both domestically and internationally. Analysts argued that the proposed amendments violated ECOWAS protocols on good governance, which forbids "substantive electoral rule changes six months before an election". Still, Wade remained on the ballot for the February 26, 2012 presidential election.

== June 23, 2011 protests ==
=== Formation and mobilization of M23 ===
The June 23 Movement emerged in direct response to President Wade's proposed constitutional reforms and quickly became the main spark for organizing opposition to his third-term bid. Alioune Tine, head of the human rights organization RADDHO, launched the initiative "Touche pas à ma Constitution" (Don't touch my Constitution), roughly a week before the National Assembly vote. Participants denounced the bill through press releases and activated their own networks to coordinate a broader response.

Opposition parties simultaneously organized their own actions against Wade's electoral project. Political youth wings in particular adopted confrontational tactics designed to attract attention: days before the vote, young militants blocked roads around Dakar's busy Sangada market, aiming to provoke arrests and scandal so that the "entire world" would see Wade's undemocratic maneuvers.

On June 23rd, as the National Assembly debated the amendments, civil society leaders such as Tine and Saint-Louis Mayor Cheikh Bamba Dièye called citizens to demonstrate in downtown Dakar. Protestors converged directly in front of the Assembly, where clashes erupted between demonstrators and security forces. Crowd size is estimated at several thousand participants according to contemporary press accounts. Violence, was partly performative, with youths throwing stones and burning tires.

From this protest cycle, M23 was formally constituted as a broad coalition bringing together more than 50 opposition parties, civil society groups, and social movements opposed to the renewal of his presidential candidacy and reforms.

Despite widespread narratives of a spontaneous "citizens' revolution", subsequent research shows that M23's mobilization relied heavily on political parties, finances and human resources. Parties provided membership lists, local contacts, and logistical capacity to turn it into a sustained protest. M23 adopted a permanent structure with a "general assembly, coordination committee, secretariat, and [specialized] commissions".

Financing was a persistent challenge. While M23 collected monthly contributions, leading opposition figures, particularly the "Big Four", namely, Macky Sall, Moustapha Niasse, Ousmane Tanor Dieng, and Idrissa Seck, covered most major costs, including expensive television coverage designed to "inform public opinion" and expand support. Demonstrations followed established party practices: hiring musicians and rappers to draw crowds, distributing food, water, T-shirts, and allowing party colors and banners to appear despite an initial rule of political neutrality.

Within M23, there were some generational tension, with younger militants advocating for more "revolutionary" tactics ("On va au palais", translated to "To the Palace") while seniors urged for more restraint.

=== Immediate outcome of the protests ===
The validation of Wade's candidacy turned the protests more confrontational. While violence remained limited compared to countries such as Ivory Coast or Guinea, clashes between security forces and citizens escalated, with reported 4 to 9 deaths during the protests. It became worse when after the Constitutional Council confirmed Wade's third term bid and his exclusion of opposition candidates on January 27th, 2012, a police officer was killed in Dakar during one the rallies.

Moreover, people with disabilities reported that the level of violence in the streets were too unsafe for their participation and even for their circulation. A planned press conference and information session on February 23rd, 2012, meant to bring "representatives of both the M23 movement and state authorities" to ask for an end to the violence, was itself disrupted by more violence.

Domestically, religious figures and intellectuals sought "peace" while, internationally, countries and foreign partners like the US, France, the EU, and the African Union, sought "stability". Despite bans on demonstrations M23 leaders, like Tine, persisted in continuing protests as they see it as their civic duty.

== State response and use of force ==
Instead of deterring Wade from pursuing a third term, his government led counter initiatives like electoral manipulation, legal pressure and police force to intimidate opponents, with allegations made that he used state resources to finance "other presidential candidates" up to $130,000 covering the deposit required for election. Although his main opponents are able to use their own networks to self-sustain, Wade's access to the state's treasury still put the latter at a disadvantage.

Opposition leaders and human rights activists were the main target of the state's response.They were subjected to intimidation, surveillance and illegal arrests. Indeed, the Criminal Investigation Division (DIC) repeatedly summoned and detained Alioune Tine, head of RADDHO and important actor of the M23, alongside other activists. These practices were denounced by diverse international NGOs, labeling them as "arbitrary". Furthermore, fears of state control of media has increased with, notably, the temporary blocking of over 80 websites, widely perceived as an attempt to control coverage of the protests.

In the streets, police repeatedly fired tear gas to disperse protestors, including tear-gas vehicles ("the dragon") deployed against crowds, which managed to kill one student at the University of Dakar. Despite this violence, the government was legally entitled to disperse unauthorized gatherings, however, it is widely perceived as illegitimate by the people. Opposition leaders such as Idrissa Seck and Ibrahima Fall were directly targeted with tear-gas grenades, and other figures like Youssou N'Dour and Cheikh Bamba Dièye were injured during these protests. Nonetheless, Interior Minister Ousmane Ngom defended these bans by citing Senegal's "long democratic tradition" and saying that only a small percent of protests requested each year are prohibited, in the name of "public order".

== Aftermath ==
=== Political outcome of the protests ===
Wade was unable to win the elections, despite all of his attempts at gaining power. In the first round of the February 26th, 2012 presidential election, he led with 34.8% compared to Macky Sall with 26.5%. Since Wade did not surpass the 50% threshold required to win from the first round, a second one was held on March 25th. Sall ended up winning with about 66% against 34% for Wade due to major support from the first-round losers, M23 participants and Assises Nationales figures encouraging people to vote for him. Wade accepted his defeat and stepped down on April 2nd, 2012.

=== M23 post-elections ===
The June 23rd Movement itself did not disappear, but post-elections, most of its members agreed to continue as an association, without renewing their membership lists. This led to an internally conflicted situation where some people were both still members of M23 and part of the government. Furthermore, the movement started to split as some viewed it as a more "bureaucratized" structure, while others formed new factions. Moreover, the movement accepted financial support, approximately $18,000 from President Sall, which led to concerns on their autonomy and corruptibility.

These concerns about their corruptibility were further raised as political allies of Macky Sall within M23 movement gained positions in his administration; examples include: Abdoulatif Coulibaly, Abdoul Aziz Tall, Alioune Tine, and Penda Mbow. Indeed, many critics argue that these civil society actors use NGOs and grassroot movements to gain popularity and thus, more political power.
