= Obelisk Square =

Obelisk Square can refer to the following public squares:

- Place de l'Obélisque, a central plaza in Dakar, Senegal
- Obelisk Square (Indianapolis), formally known as the Veterans Memorial Plaza, part of the Indiana World War Memorial Plaza in Indianapolis, Indiana, United States
