= List of mayors of Saint-Louis, Senegal =

The following is a list of mayors of the city of Saint-Louis, Senegal. Senegal was under French colonial rule until April 1960.

- Charles Thevenot, circa 1764-1778
- Charles Pierre Cornier, circa 1778-1800
- Flammand, circa 1801-1808
- Charles Porquet, circa 1809-1815
- Pierre Dubois, circa 1816-1822
- Francois Michel Pellegrin, circa 1823-1828
- Jean-Jacques Alin, circa 1829-1847
- Barthélémy Durand Valantin, circa 1847-1851
- Nicolas d’Erneville, 1851-1856
- Marcelin Herice, 1856
- Blaise Dumont, 1856-1872
- Auguste Bréchet, 1872-1875
- Gaspard Devès, 1875-1880
- Auguste de Bourmeister, 1882-1889
- Jean-Jacques Crespin, 1890-1891, 1894-1895
- Jules Couchard, 1891-1894
- Louis Descemet, 1895-1909
- Justin Devès, 1909-1910, 1912-1916
- Amadou Dugay Clédor, 1919-1925
- ?
- Babacar Seye, 1952-1960
- Macodou Ndiaye, 1960-1963
- Masseck Ndiaye, 1963-1990
- Abdoulaye Chimère Diaw, 1990-2002
- Oumane Masseck Ndiaye, 2002-2009
- Cheikh Bamba Dièye, 2009-2014
- Mansour Faye, circa 2014

== See also ==
- Timeline of Saint-Louis, Senegal
- Quatre Communes
- List of mayors of Dakar

== Bibliography ==
- Henri Jacques Légier (1968). "Institutions municipales et politique coloniale: les Communes du Sénégal". Revue française d'histoire d'outre-mer (in French). 55 (201): 414–464. doi:10.3406/outre.1968.1473 – via Persee.fr.
- François Zuccarelli [in French] (1973). "Les maîres de Saint-Louis et Gorée de 1816 à 1872" [Mayors of Saint-Louis and Gorée]. Bulletin de l'Institut Fondamental d'Afrique Noire, Série B: Sciences humaines (in French). 35. ISSN 0018-9642. OCLC 772635318.
