= Sangaré Niamoto Ba =

Malian politician

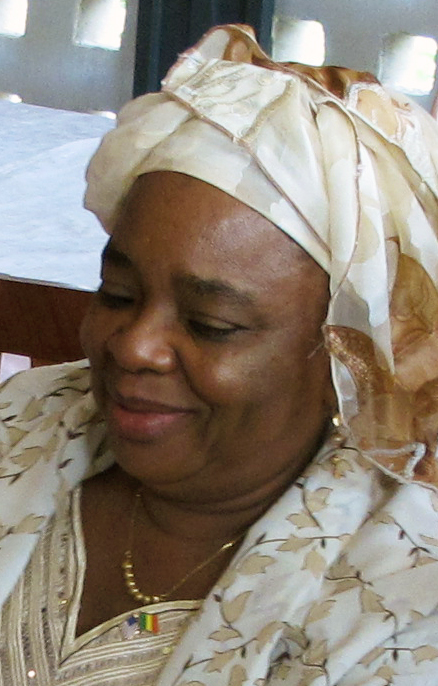
- in 2011
- Born: April 22, 1955 (age 71); Bamako, French Sudan (now Bamako, Mali)
- Education: Cheikh Anta Diop University

Sangaré Niamoto Ba (born 22 April 1955) is a Malian former minister and politician.

== Life ==
Ba was born in Bamako in 1955. She went to Cheikh Anta Diop University in Dakar. She joined the ministry in Mali in 1982.

In 2009, she became secretary general in the Ministry of Economy and Finance. In 2011, she was asked to lead the Ministry of Industry, Investment and Commerce representing Mali at the World Trade Organisation. She was minister until 2012.

== Family ==
She is married and had four children.
