= Sundeep Waslekar =

Indian author and public policy thinker

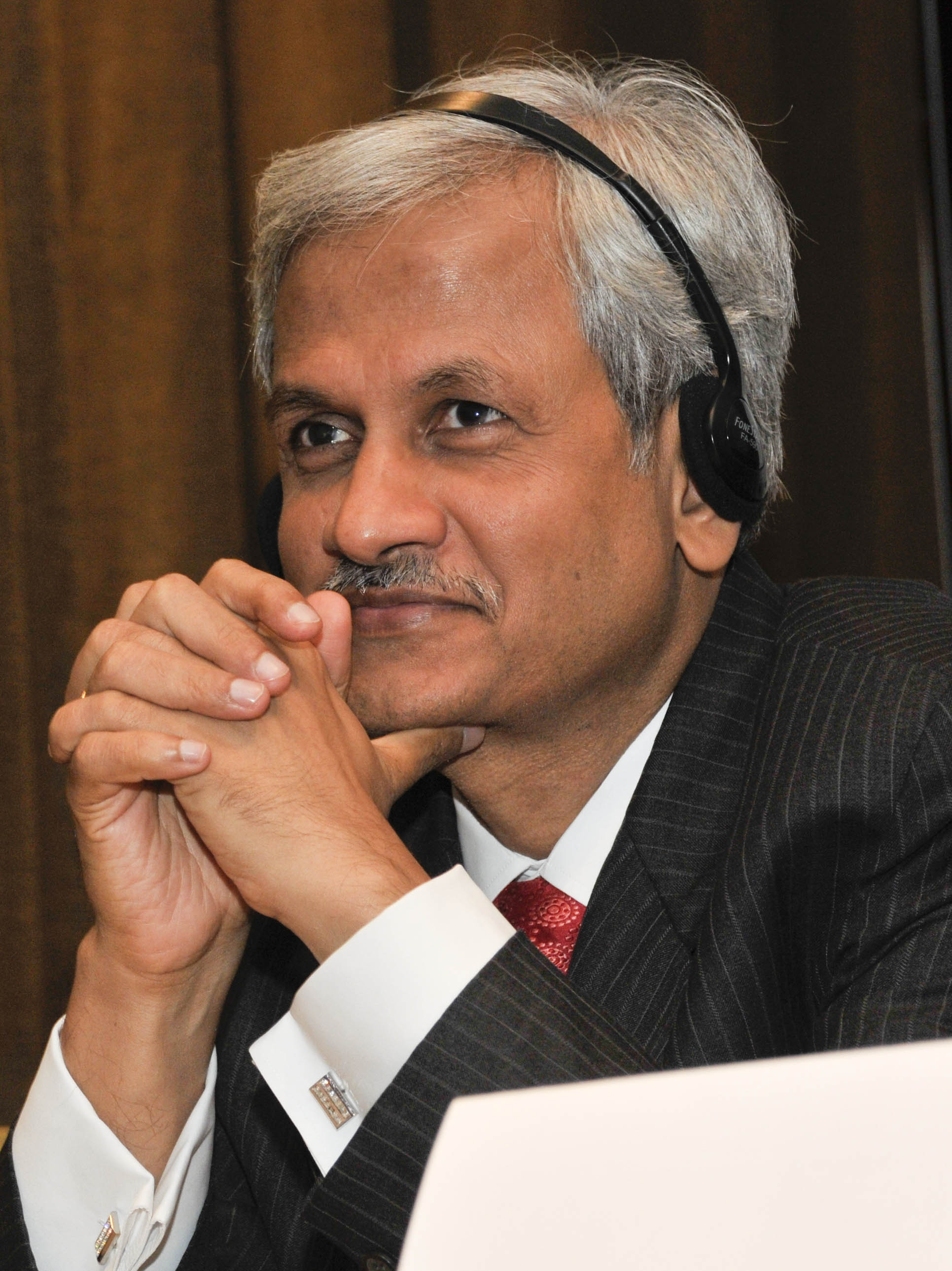
- Waslekar at the Horasis Global China Business Meeting 2009
- Born: Mumbai, India
- Education: Oxford University
- Known for: Peace and conflict studies, Global Future, Water Diplomacy
- Scientific career
- Fields: Governance, Peace and conflict studies
- Workplaces: Strategic Foresight Group, Centre for Policy Research, International IDEA

Sundeep Waslekar is an Indian author, public policy analyst, and founder of the Strategic Foresight Group, a think tank based in Mumbai. He has worked on international policy dialogues related to cooperation and conflict resolution.

Reports from the Strategic Foresight Group have been referenced in proceedings of the House of Commons of the United Kingdom, including during debates on water security in the Middle East. His recommendations have also been cited in various United Nations documents, including references before the United Nations Security Council. In 2019, Waslekar was among the signatories of the Normandy Manifesto for World Peace, a statement supported by global figures advocating diplomatic approaches to resolving international tensions.

== Education ==
Waslekar was born in Mumbai, India, and raised in Dombivli. He obtained a Master of Commerce from the University of Mumbai. After graduation, he published an article on reforming the global financial system in Financial Express, and presented his views at a seminar hosted by Liberal International.

In December 2011, he received an honorary Doctor of Literature (D.Litt.) from Symbiosis International University. In 2014, he was elected Senior Research Fellow at the Centre for the Resolution of Intractable Conflicts, Harris Manchester College, Oxford.

== Contributions to Global Policy ==
A key contribution is the conceptualization of the "Blue Peace" framework, which promotes transboundary water cooperation as a means to foster peace and stability among nations. He has participated in policy discussions involving the United Nations, the World Bank, and regional governments on topics such as cooperation and future preparedness.

== Peace processes ==
In the 1980s, Waslekar contributed articles to international newspapers such as the Ottawa Citizen, San Jose Mercury News, Hamilton Spectator, and Toledo Blade. In 1985, during the United Nations International Year of Peace, he led an Eight-Nation Peace Mission from Rome to Ottawa. He later joined the Centre for Policy Research to focus on economic collaboration and conflict resolution in South Asia. In 1991, he founded the International Centre for Peace Initiatives, which participated in diplomatic efforts between India and Pakistan.

Following the September 11 attacks, he participated in dialogues between Western and Islamic leaders organized with the Alliance of Liberals and Democrats for Europe and the League of Arab States.

In the early 2000s, he and Ilmas Futehally of the Strategic Foresight Group developed cost-of-conflict models for India–Pakistan, Sri Lanka, and the Middle East. In 2015, he introduced the Water Cooperation Quotient to assess cooperation in transboundary river basins. The model was revised in 2017 to cover 286 shared river basins worldwide and received political support from the InterAction Council of Former Heads of State and Government.

Waslekar was involved in the development of the Blue Peace framework, for using water as an instrument of peace, a concept which led to the first United Nations Security Council session on water, peace, and security (UNSC 7818).

== Governance ==
Between 1989 and 1991, Waslekar consulted with international leaders to develop proposals for post–Cold War global governance. In the 1990s, he published two books on governance in South Asia: South Asian Drama: Travails of Misgovernance and Dharma Rajya: Path-breaking Reforms for India's Governance.

In 2002, he proposed a framework for categorizing the Indian economy based on consumption patterns. In 2005, he was associated with Canadian prime minister Paul Martin’s proposal for a G-20 framework.

== Global future ==
In 2007, Waslekar published an article in The Economic Times discussing the potential for global financial instability. In 2008, the Strategic Foresight Group published a report titled Emerging Issues: 2011–2020 outlining 20 global trends.

He spoke at various conferences hosted by the Aspen Institute and Bertelsmann Foundation in 2009 on the global economic crisis. In 2011, he co-authored the book Big Questions of Our Time with Ilmas Futehally, addressing future challenges in philosophy, politics, and science.

== Selected bibliography ==
- The New World Order, 1991, Konark Publishers Pvt Ltd ISBN 81-220-0241-2
- South Asian Drama: Travails of Misgovernance, 1996, Konark Publishers Pvt Ltd ISBN 81-220-0416-4
- Dharma Rajya: Path-breaking Reforms for India's Governance, 1998, Konark Publishers Pvt Ltd ISBN 81-220-0528-4
- The Final Settlement: Restructuring India-Pakistan Relations, 2005, International Centre for Peace Initiatives ISBN 81-88262-06-4
- An Inclusive World: In which the West, Islam and the Rest have a stake, 2007, Strategic Foresight Group ISBN 81-88262-09-9
- Cost of Conflict in the Middle East, 2009, Strategic Foresight Group ISBN 978-81-88262-12-0, co-authored with Ilmas Futehally
- Eka dishecha Shodh
- Big Questions of Our Time, 2011, Strategic Foresight Group ISBN 978-81-88262-16-8, co-authored with Ilmas Futehally
