= Sékou Ba =

Burkinabé politician

Sékou Ba (born 3 May 1955) is a Burkinabé politician who was Minister of Animal Resources for the Government of Burkino Faso from July 2007 to April 2011. He is a member of the Congress for Democracy and Progress (CDP).

== Biography ==
Ba was born in Kampti, located in Poni Province. After attending school in Bobo-Dioulasso, he continued his studies at the University of Dakar in Senegal and then in France.

Back in Burkina Faso, he was in charge of studies at the Ministry for Economic Promotion's Directorate for Control of State Companies from 1984 to 1986. He was subsequently department head at the Directorate for Control of State Companies from 1988 to 1990, Director-General of the Faso Fani Factory from 1990 to 1992 and Director of Inspection of Public Enterprises and Parastatals from 1992 to 1993. After serving as Secretary-General of the Ministry of Trade, Industry and Mines from 1993 to 1995, he was President of the Privatization Commission from 1995 to 1997 and Director-General of the National Office of Foreign Trade from 1998 to 2006.

Ba was appointed to the government on 6 January 2006 as Minister of Housing and City Planning. Following the May 2007 parliamentary election, he was moved to the post of Minister of Animal Resources on 10 June 2007.

Ba is a member of the National Council of the ruling CDP. He has also served as Secretary-General of the CDP's Economy and Development Commission, and subsequently as Vice President of the same Commission.
