= Geneva Water Hub =

Swiss-based research institute

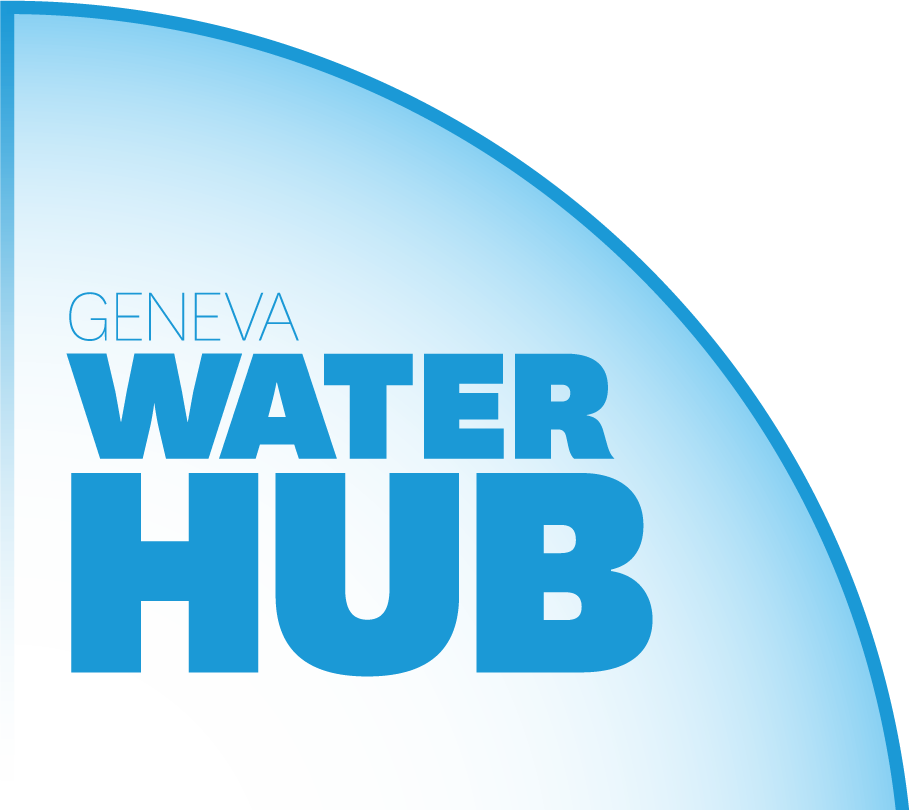
- Established: 2014
- Focus: Water Research and Policy Institute
- Key people: Mark Zeitoun (Director); Christian Bréthaut (Scientific Director); Danilo Türk (Lead Political Advisor)
- Location: Institute for Environmental Sciences of the University of Geneva, and World Meteorological Organization, Geneva, Switzerland
- Website: www.genevawaterhub.org/

The Geneva Water Hub is a water research and policy institute headquartered in Geneva, Switzerland. Established by the Swiss Confederation and the University of Geneva it focuses on hydro-diplomacy to prevent and resolve water-related conflicts, conducts water related research, runs education courses and is a think-tank on global water governance and its challenges.

== History and Key Work ==
Founded in 2014, the Geneva Water Hub, with offices at the University of Geneva and the World Meteorological Organization, works to bridge the gap between water research, policy and practice on the ground - often at cross boundary and river basin scale.

From 2015 until 2017 it acted as the Secretariat to the Global High Level Panel on Water and Peace and now acts as the secretariat for the Group of Friends for Water and Peace, about forty countries represented by their Permanent Missions to the United Nations in Geneva. It also coordinates the Universities Partnership for Water Cooperation and Diplomacy, launched at the 2018 World Economic Forum in Davos, Switzerland with IHE Delft Institute for Water Education, the Indian Institute of Technology Guwahati, the German-Kazakh University in Almaty, and Oregon State University. This university consortium was established to encourage dialogue and capacity-building between countries and among different professional sectors.

=== Water and Peace ===
In 2015, the World Economic Forum ranked water scarcity as the largest global risk over the next decade. Already, 40% of the world's population is affected by water scarcity on a planet where more than 260 international rivers cross many man-made boundaries. In addition, more than half the planet's wetlands have disappeared and climate change is impacting weather and water patterns around the world.

Yet, as the dialogue of ‘water wars’ increases, research shows that water is far more a tool for cooperation and peace than conflict. During the 20th century there were only seven minor confrontations over water, with 145 treaties signed in the same 100 years.

Through academic research, policy and hydro-diplomacy the Geneva Water Hub works to shift the global dialogue from ‘water and conflict’ to ‘water for peace and cooperation’, to deliver better water governance and the long-term protection of critical water resources and infrastructure.

=== Global High-Level Panel on Water and Peace ===
In 2015, the Geneva Water Hub began working as Secretariat to the Global High Level Panel on Water and Peace – a 15 country co-convened initiative focused on strengthening the global framework to prevent and resolve water-related conflicts and to facilitate the use of water as an instrument of peace and cooperation.

In its 2017 report “A Matter of Survival” the Global High-Level Panel on Water and Peace outlined its recommendations for a fundamental rethinking of international water cooperation from the UN Security Council to other multilateral institutions and down to grass-roots level organisations.

=== Water Governance Education ===
At the University of Geneva, the Geneva Water Hub runs an annual Summer School in Water Governance and a distance learning course on International Water Law and the Law of Transboundary Aquifers. It also offers several open access Massive Online Open Courses for water technicians and the water policy community on topics such as water resources policy and management, international water law and ecosystem services.
