= Timeline of Saint-Louis, Senegal =

The following is a timeline of the history of the city of Saint-Louis, Senegal.

== Pre-17th Century ==
- 10-11th century - The mouth of the Senegal river is part of the region of Sunghana, ruled by chiefs related to the Jaa'ogo dynasty of Takrur. The salines of Awlil are nearby.
- 13th century - Waalo and the Jolof Empire are founded by Ndiadiane Ndiaye

== 17th Century ==
- 1626 - Representatives of Compagnie Normande of Dieppe, France arrive at the mouth of the Senegal river.
- 1638 - Captain Thomas Lambert of Dieppe establishes a trading post near the village of Bieurt, on the south bank of the river. Refusing to pay customs or tolls to the local kings, Lambert's post is attacked.
- 1658 - A fortified post is rebuilt on Bocos island.
- 1658-1660 - The trading post moves to the island of Ndar, renamed Saint-Louis.

== 18th Century ==
- 1758 - May: British forces take French fort.
- 1763 - Catholic Apostolic Prefecture of Sénégal established.
- 1783 - French in power in region per Treaty of Paris (1783).

== 19th Century ==
- 1809 - British in power in region.
- 1814 - French in power in region per Treaty of Paris (1814).
- 1817 - French school founded by Jean Dard.
- 1819 - Catholic Sisters of St. Joseph of Cluny, France arrive in Saint-Louis.
- 1822 - Court of First Instance and Appeals Court established.
- 1828 - St. Louis Cathedral consecrated.
- 1847 - Great Mosque of Saint-Louis built.
- 1848 - French citizenship nominally granted to residents of Saint-Louis.
- 1849 - Public library established.
- 1852 - Branch of French trading firm Maurel & Prom in business.
- 1853 - Guet N'Dar bridge built to Isle de Sor (approximate date).
- 1856
  - Moniteur du Sénégal et dépendances colonial government newspaper begins publication.
  - École des otages (school) active.
- 1858 - Walo becomes part of Saint-Louis.
- 1865 - Faidherbe Bridge opens.
- 1872 - Municipal government established.
- 1881 - Yellow fever outbreak.
- 1885
  - Dakar–Saint-Louis railway built.
  - Mbakhana water pumping station begins operating.
  - Le Réveil du Sénégal newspaper begins publication.
- 1895 - Saint-Louis becomes capital of French West Africa.
- 1897 - Faidherbe Bridge rebuilt.

== 20th century ==
- 1903
  - Capital of French West Africa moved from Saint-Louis to Dakar.
  - École normale (school) established.
- 1904 - Population: 24,070.
- 1905 - Bamako-Saint-Louis railway begins operating.
- 1916
  - French citizenship fully extended to residents of Saint-Louis.
  - École Blanchot (school) founded.
- 1919 - Lycée Faidherbe (school) established.
- 1923 - Ecole des Enfants de Troupe de Saint-Louis du Sénégal (school) opens.
- 1956 - Musée du Centre de recherches et de documentation du Sénégal à Saint-Louis (museum) opens.
- 1957 - Capital of French Colonial Mauritania moved from Saint-Louis to Nouakchott.
- 1960 - Saint Louis becomes part of independent Republic of Senegal.
- 1965 - Institut culturel et linguistique Jean-Mermoz founded.
- 1969 - ASC Linguère (football club) formed.
- 1990 - University of Saint-Louis established.
- 1993 - Festival international de jazz de Saint-Louis active.
- 1994 - Population: 132,449 (estimate).
- 1999 - Population: 147,961.
- 2000 - Island of Saint-Louis designated an Unesco World Heritage Site.

== 21st century ==
- 2009 - Cheikh Bamba Dièye elected mayor.
- 2011 - Population: 277,245.
- 2014 - Mansour Faye elected mayor.

== See also ==
- Saint-Louis history
- List of mayors of Saint-Louis, Senegal
- List of colonial governors of Senegal, 1626-1960, intermittently headquartered in Saint-Louis
- List of heritage sites in the Saint-Louis Region, Senegal
- Timeline of Senegal
- Timeline of Dakar

== Bibliography ==
in English

- "St Louis (1.)" . Encyclopædia Britannica. Vol. 21 (9th ed.). 1886. pp. 182–183.
- "St Louis (Senegal)" . Encyclopædia Britannica. Vol. 24 (11th ed.). 1910. p. 27.
- Lucie Colvin Phillips (1972). Kajor and its diplomatic relations with Saint-Louis-du-Sénégal, 1763-1861 (PhD). Columbia University. OCLC 872514124.
- Michael David Marcson (1976). European-African interaction in the Precolonial Period: Saint-Louis-Senegal 1758-1854 (PhD). Princeton University. OCLC 844188035.
- Karen Amanda Sackur (1999). Development of Creole society and culture in Saint-Louis and Goree, 1719-1817 (Ph.D). University of London, School of Oriental and African Studies – via British Library.
- Kalala Ngalamulume (2006). "Plague and Violence in Saint-Louis-du-Sénégal, 1917-1920". Cahiers d'Études africaines. 183.
- Hilary Jones (2013). Métis of Senegal: Urban Life and Politics in French West Africa. Indiana University Press. ISBN 978-0-253-00705-6. (About Saint Louis)

in French

- Prosper Alquier (1922). "Saint-Louis du Senegal pendant la Revolution et L'Empire". Bulletin (in French). Comité d'études historiques et scientifiques de l'Afrique occidentale française – via Gallica.bnf.fr.
- Boulegue, Jean (2013). Les royaumes wolof dans l'espace sénégambien (XIIIe-XVIIIe siècle). Paris: Karthala Editions. p. 187.
- Claude Pulvenis (1968). "Une epidemie de fievre jaune'a Saint-Louis du Senegal (1881)". Bulletin de l'Institut Fondamental d'Afrique Noire (in French). 30.
- François Zuccarelli [in French] (1973). "Les maîres de Saint-Louis et Gorée de 1816 à 1872" [Mayors of Saint-Louis and Gorée]. Bulletin de l'Institut Fondamental d'Afrique Noire, Série B: Sciences humaines (in French). 35. ISSN 0018-9642. OCLC 772635318.
- Régine Bonnardel (1993). Saint-Louis du Sénégal: Mort ou naissance? (in French). L'Harmattan. ISBN 978-2-296-21988-5.
- Alain Sinou (1993). Comptoirs et villes coloniales du Senegal: Saint-Louis, Goree, Dakar (in French). Paris: Éditions Karthala. ISBN 2-86537-393-2.
- Jean-Pierre Dozon [in French] (2012). Saint-Louis du Sénégal: Palimpseste d'une ville (in French). Karthala. ISBN 978-2-8111-4976-5.
- Guillaume Vial (2019). Femmes d'influence. Les signares de Saint-Louis du Sénégal et de Gorée XVIIIe-XIXe siècle. Étude critique d'une identité métisse (in French). Paris: Éditions Maisonneuve & Larose - Hémisphères Éditions. ISBN 978-2-37701-043-1.

== Images ==
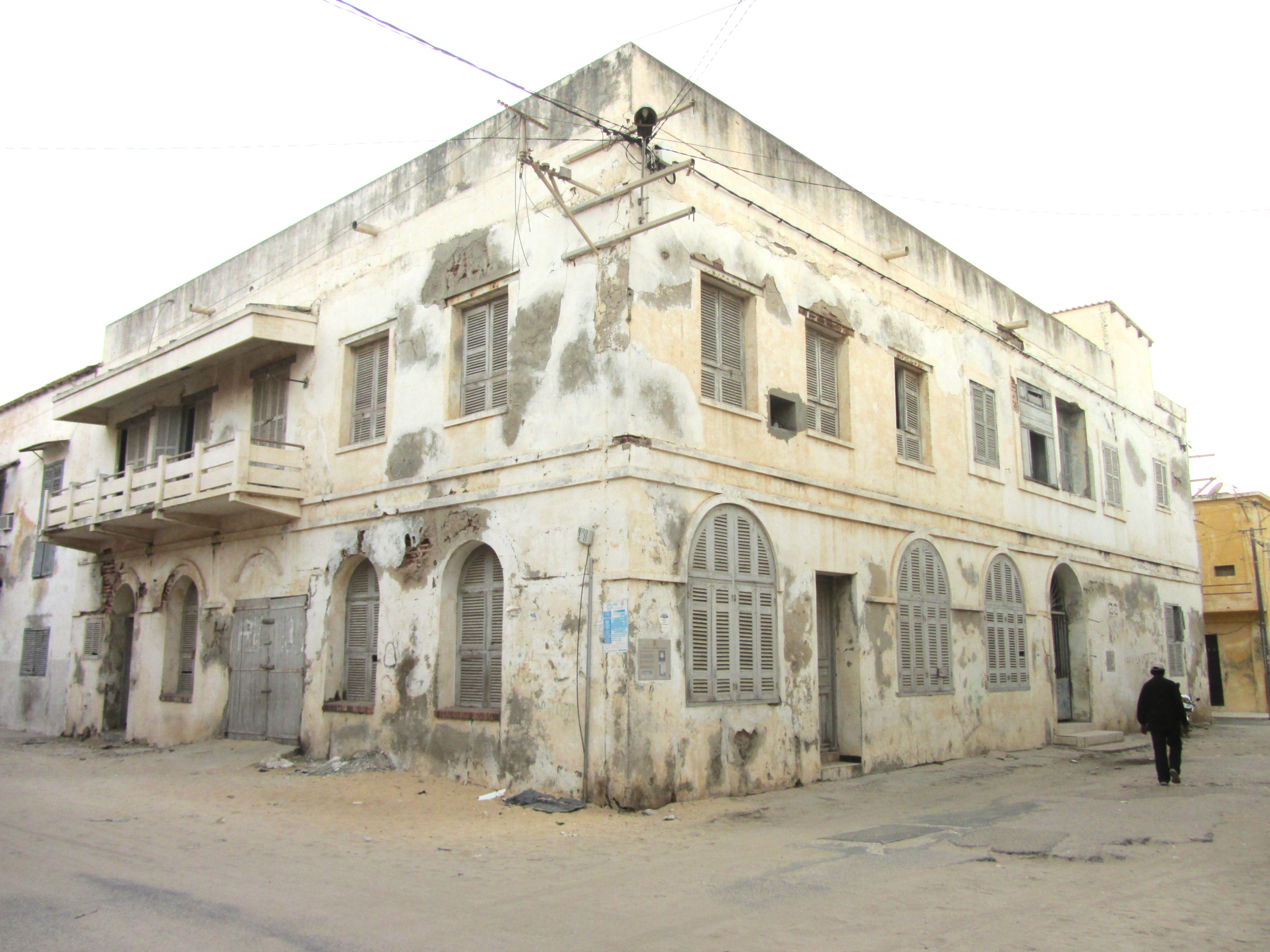
Orphelinat des Sœurs de Saint-Joseph de Cluny (photo 2013). The nuns arrived in 1819

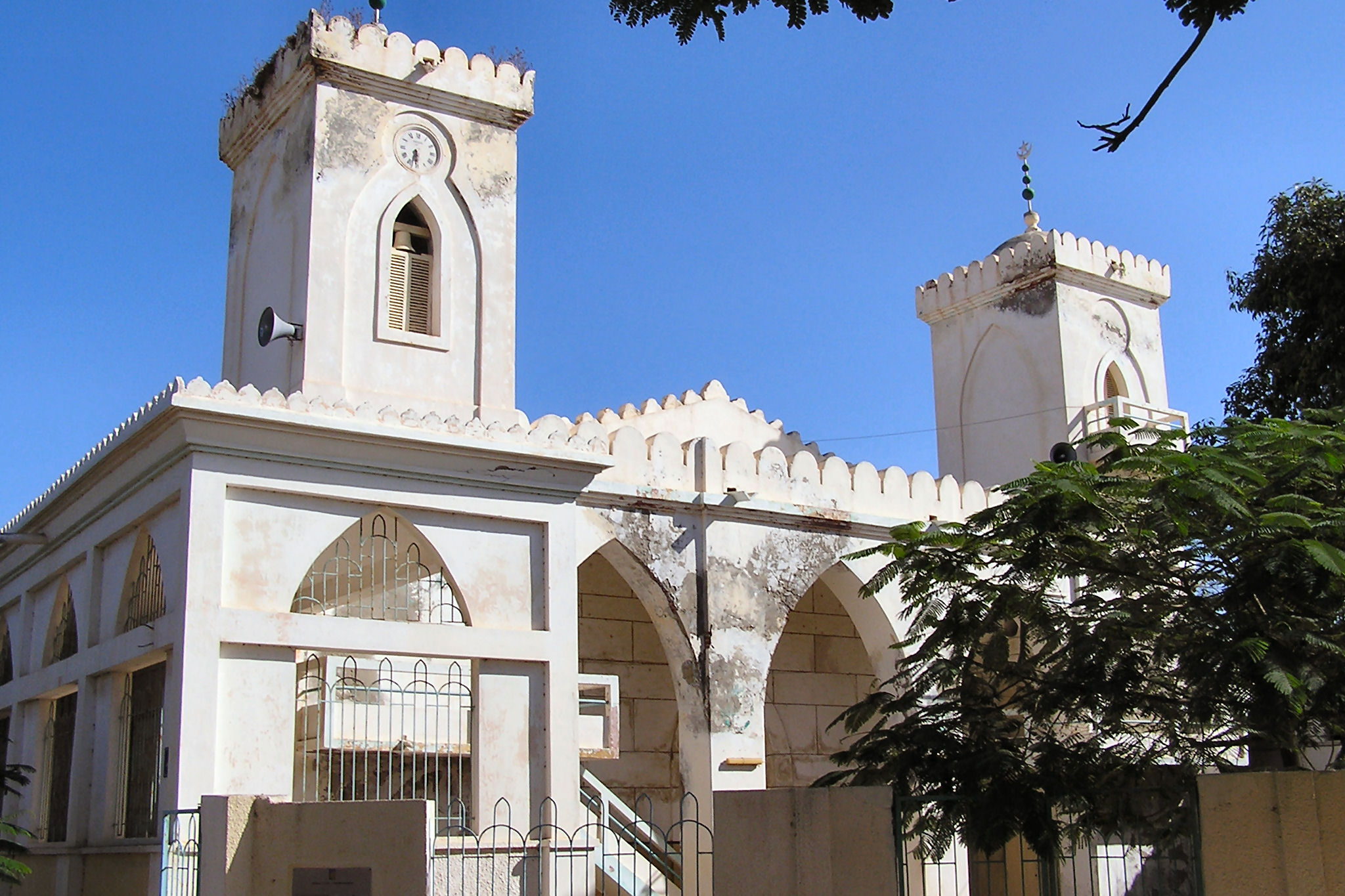
Great Mosque, built 1847 (photo 2007)

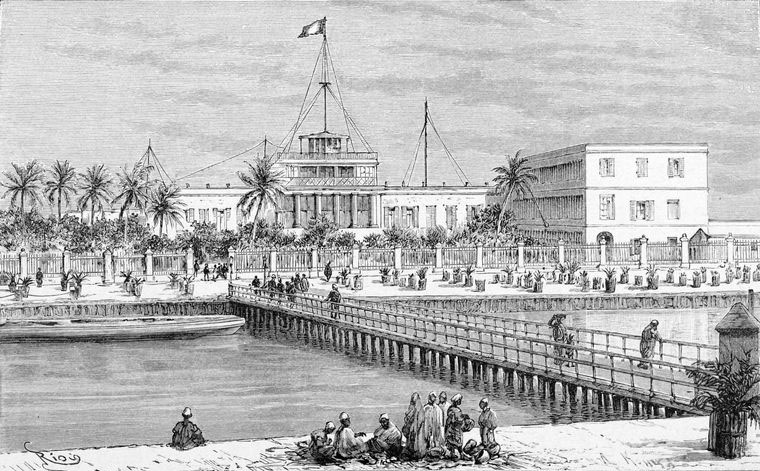
Guet-N'Dar bridge, built circa 1853, rebuilt 1865

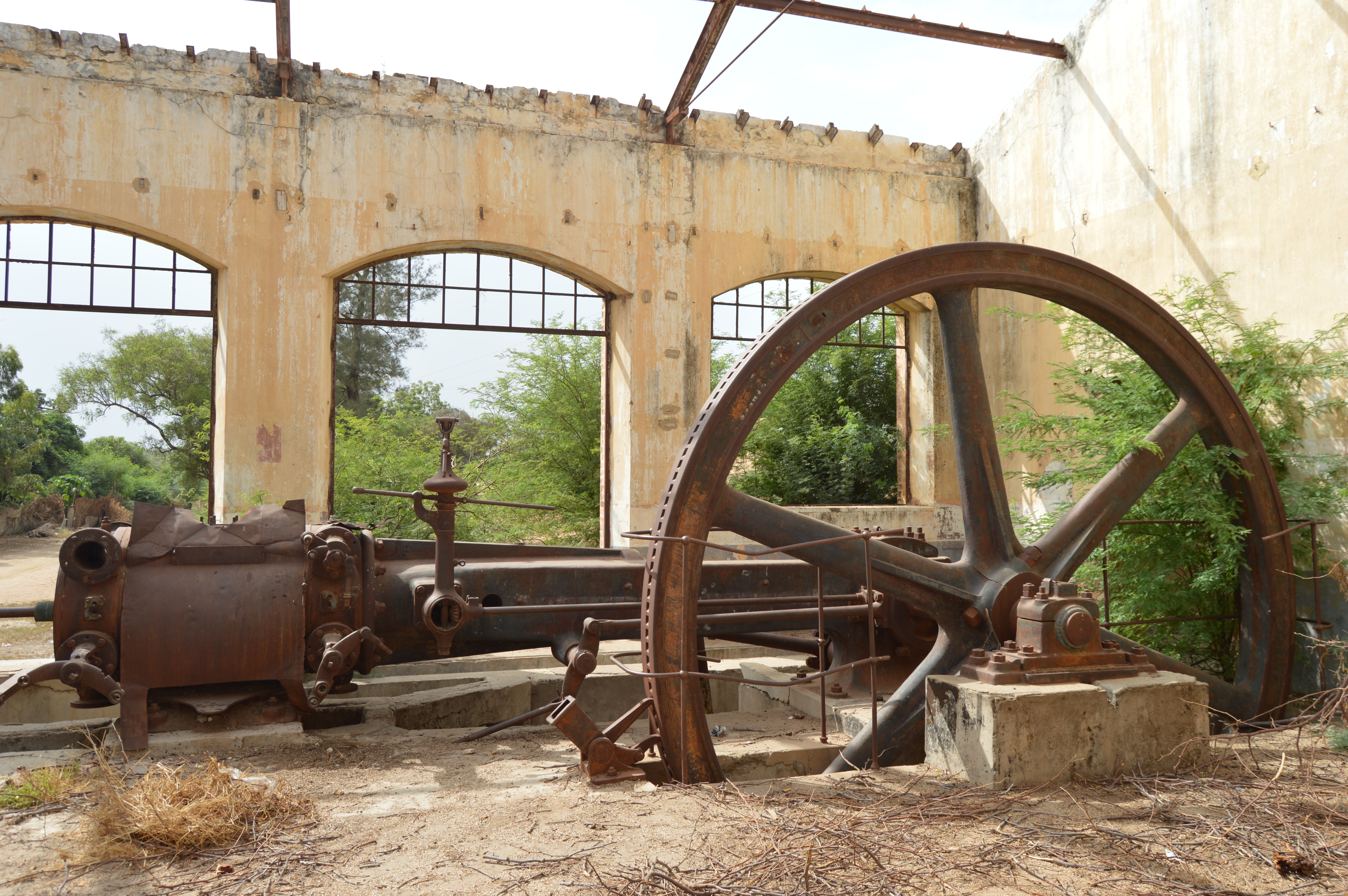
Mbakhana water pumping station, in operation 1885-1952 (photo 2016)

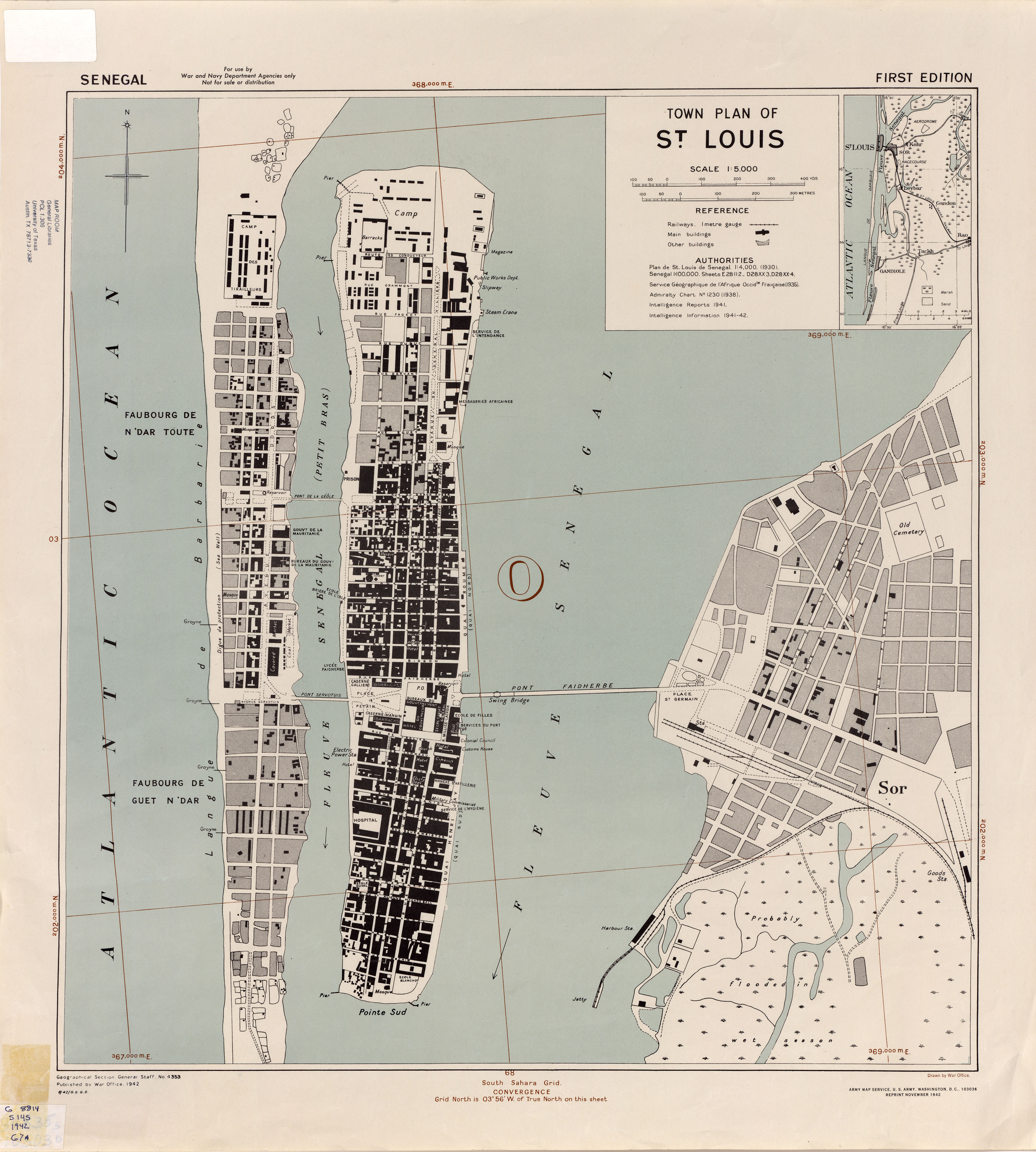
Map of Saint Louis, 1942
