= Mansour Faye =

Senegalese politician

Mansour Faye (born 16 May 1965) is a Senegalese politician. During the local elections in June 2014, he was elected mayor of Saint-Louis. In 2014, he was appointed as Minister of Hydraulics and Sanitation in the Dionne Cabinet. In 2015, he became a vice-chair of the Global High-Level Panel on Water and Peace. He was re-elected mayor in the 2022 local elections.

He was also Minister of Infrastructure, Land Transport and Opening Up in the Fourth Sall government.

== See also ==
- List of mayors of Saint-Louis, Senegal
- Timeline of Saint-Louis, Senegal
