= Cost of conflict =

Tool to calculate the price of human conflict

Cost of Conflict is a tool which attempts to calculate the price of conflict to the human race. The idea is to examine this cost, not only in terms of the deaths and casualties and the economic costs borne by the people involved, but also the social, developmental, environmental and strategic costs of conflict. In most cases organizations measure and analyze the economic and broader development costs of conflict. While this conventional method of assessing the impact of conflict is fairly in-depth, it does not provide a comprehensive overview of a country or region embroiled in conflict. One of the earliest studies assessing the true cost of conflict on a variety of parameters was commissioned by Saferworld and compiled by Michael Cranna. Strategic Foresight Group has taken this science to a new level by developing a multi-disciplinary methodology, that has been applied to most parts of the world. A key benefit of using this tool is to encourage people to look at conflict in new ways and to widen public discussion of the subject, and to bring new insights to the debate on global security.

Peacebuilding theories predict that cost–benefit analysis impacts the peace process. The cost of conflict is in contrast with the price of unjust peace.

== Methodology ==
The cost of conflict methodology takes into account different costs a conflict generates, including economic, military, environmental, social, and political costs. The approach considers direct costs of conflict, for instance, human deaths, expenses, destruction of land and physical infrastructure; as well as indirect costs that impact a society, for instance, migration, humiliation, the growth of extremism, and the lack of civil society. The approach also examines the neighboring countries involved and assesses the impact on them as well as on the international community. Some studies are measured on a thematic basis, a recent example of which is the war on terror – though in this case most of the studies are done by the United States and examine the costs borne specifically by them.

These studies follow a similar pattern. A brief introduction sets the conflict in context and defines the period of the conflict being studied, as is the pattern followed by Michael Cranna in his book. The study is based on extensive research, inputs from experts within the conflict region and collaboration with policy experts. As in the case of the collection by Cranna and a report on the Middle East by Strategic Foresight Group, these studies began with workshops involving organizations, governments, and intellectuals, which proved important in setting the priorities and direction of the studies. Such endeavors hold no weight without the input of multi-domain experts from the conflict region under consideration. Each study also serves as an analytical tool and assesses the past, present, and future costs of conflicts using a wide range of parameters.

With the use of such a tool and methodology, the question arises as to why researchers, intellectuals, and organizations might look at the cost of conflict, as opposed to discussing the benefits of peace. While it is important for people to benefit from peace and reconciliation through trade, cultural exchange and cooperation, it is much more crucial for them to understand and unravel the incentive structure of conflict and rid themselves of cost. Thus the use of 'cost of conflict' as a new and evolving tool to mobilize public opinion, broaden debate and examine new avenues for peace becomes extremely crucial.

== Comprehensive Cost of Conflict Reports ==
=== The True Cost of Conflict ===
The True Cost of Conflict is a compilation, edited by Michael Cranna from Saferworld in 1994. It comprises studies on the costs of seven different conflicts. The costs entail the effects of conflict on health, education, civil and political rights, trade, power supply, and transportation, amongst others.

In the case of the internal conflict in Peru, Cranna and David Shave explicate the potential benefits that the country could have accrued, if the conflict had not occurred. By taking a cross section analysis of Bolivia, Chile, and Ecuador, they conclude that Peru recorded the most significant drop in GDP growth due to international recession and suffered the highest rate of inflation in the 1980s. Hence, "while all of Latin America suffered during the 1980's, no main Latin American country fell further… than Peru."

=== Strategic Foresight Group's Cost of Conflict Reports ===
Strategic Foresight Group offers three reports—published in 2009 (Middle East), 2006 (Sri Lanka), and 2004 (India/Pakistan)—on the cost of conflicts in Asia. The reports take into account a varied number of parameters, including military, economic, socio-political, environmental, psychological, and diplomatic costs, among others. In other words, the report inculcates a comprehensive perspective on the effects of war and its aftermath. The documents are presented in graphical form for easy and quick comprehension by decision makers. Apart from measuring the costs that have occurred in the past, the reports also include potential future scenarios for conflict and their consequences.

==== Cost of Conflict in India/Pakistan ====
Strategic Foresight Group led the first endeavor in the field of cost of conflict studies, which was received extremely well by the media and political strata. The report has several interesting findings. According to the report, at least 100,000 families suffered direct human costs on account of the four wars between India and Pakistan. In addition, troop mobilization in Operation Prakaram (December 2001 – October 2002), cost India and Pakistan a combined $3 billion. A similar mobilization in the future would see a 50% increase in costs on both sides.

==== Cost of Conflict in Sri Lanka ====
This report focuses on the Sri Lankan Civil War, a twenty-six-year-long military conflict between the Tamil insurgents and successive Sri Lankan governments. According to the report, Sri Lanka was the most militarized of the South Asian countries, with 8,000 military personnel per million population. In terms of military expenditure as percentage of GDP, Sri Lanka had the largest expenditure in the region. The country's defense expenditure is also higher than in other comparable conflict-ridden countries such as Colombia, Myanmar, Sierra Leone, Sudan, the Philippines, and Uganda.

==== Cost of Conflict in the Middle East ====
Lastly, the Cost of Conflict in the Middle East calculates the direct and indirect costs of successive wars in the Middle East. It involves all the countries affected. Some interesting findings from the report include the following points: 7 out of the 10 highest military spenders in the world are currently from the Middle East, and the cumulative military expenditure is expected to double in the next 10 years. The region also has the highest number of military personnel per million people in the world. The First Gulf War in 1990 emitted CO_{2} that was equivalent to 1.5% of the world's annual emissions. The report has special chapters dedicated to the Israeli–Palestinian conflict.

==== Opportunity Cost ====
The most unusual feature in these reports is the opportunity cost of conflict – that is the economic benefits that could have been accrued had there not been conflicts in these countries or regions. According to the reports, countries in the Middle East that are directly involved in or affected by the Israeli-Palestinian conflict, internal strife in Lebanon, and the US invasion of Iraq have lost $12 trillion (in 2006 dollar value) in opportunity costs from 1991 to 2010. In the case of Sri Lanka, SFG stated that Foreign Direct Investment (FDI) remained stagnant during periods of civil war and that net FDI increased during periods of ceasefire. In 2004, Strategic Foresight Group stated that, provided the absence of major conflict, no global recession, and effective political and resource management, India and Pakistan could achieve growth rates of 10% and 7%, respectively.

== Thematic Cost of Conflict Reports ==
=== Africa's Missing Billions ===
A report conducted by 3 international organizations in 2007 highlighted the heavy cost of development in Africa, due to ensuing conflicts in various countries. The report conducted by Oxfam International, the International Action Network on Small Arms, and Saferworld stated that 23 African countries were involved in one form of conflict or another between 1990 and 2005.

During these 15 years, the cost of conflict in Africa was equivalent to the funds granted to the continent in international aid over the same period – both conflicts and aid from 1990 to 2005 amounted to $284 billion. In other words, the money lost in conflict could have been used in more effective ways, such as addressing the needs of education, clean water and sanitation, and the prevention of harmful diseases in African countries.

Other facts included in the report: On average, armed conflict shrinks an African nation's economy by 15 percent. Conflicts are costing African economies an average of $18 billion a year. Conflicts in countries like Burundi and Rwanda have cost their governments an annual economic loss of 37% and 32% of their GDP respectively.

=== US war on terror ===
Several studies have been conducted on the economic costs of the US war on terror, which began in 2001. These include studies by William Nordhaus in 2002, Wallsten & Kosec in 2005, and successive studies by the US Congressional Budget Office (CBO). A majority of these reports focus on the 2003 war in Iraq, but the costs also involve the Bush administration's wider global war on terror as well.

The reports contain the cost of occupation – reconstruction and security, diplomatic, and military expenses. The findings are compared to previous US wars in Vietnam and Korea. The studies also contain other areas where this money could have been spent more efficiently.

Perhaps the most famous study is one conducted by Harvard professor Linda Bilmes and Nobel Prize winner Joseph Stiglitz. While conventional estimates mark the economic cost for the US at $400 billion in 2007, the Stiglitz study on the "war on terror" estimates the total cost by 2015 at $1 trillion. This is because the report takes into account indirect costs such as disability pensions and the price of oil. In a 2008 update, Stiglitz and his co-author Linda Bilmes published the book The Three Trillion Dollar War: The True Cost of the Iraq Conflict, which describes additional hidden costs.

A new report dated July 4, 2011 by the Eisenhower Research Project based at Brown University's Watson Institute for International Studies estimates that nearly 10 years after the declaration of the war on terror, the wars in Afghanistan, Iraq, and Pakistan have killed at least 225,000 people, including men and women in uniform, contractors, and civilians. The wars will cost Americans between $3.2 and $4 trillion, including medical care and disability for current and future war veterans. The group's Costs of War Project, which involved more than 20 economists, anthropologists, lawyers, humanitarian personnel, and political scientists. The organization provides new estimates of the total war cost as well as other direct and indirect human and economic costs of the US military response to the 9/11 attacks. The $3.2- $4 trillion figure does not include substantial probable future interest on war-related debt.

The "Costs of War" report also includes other statistics such as deaths, injuries and displaced persons. For instance, more than 31,000 people in uniform and military contractors have died, including the Iraqi and Afghan security forces and other military forces allied with the United States. By a very conservative estimate, 137,000 civilians have been killed in Iraq and Afghanistan by all parties to these conflicts. The wars have created more than 7.8 million refugees among Iraqis, Afghans, and Pakistanis.

Because the wars have been financed almost entirely by borrowing, $185 billion in interest has already been paid on war spending, and another $1 trillion could accrue in interest alone through 2020. Federal obligations to care for past and future veterans of these wars will likely total between $600–$950 billion. This number is not included in most analyses of the costs of war and will not peak until mid-century.

== Results of the War in Afghanistan and Iraq ==
While it was promised that the US invasions would bring democracy to both countries, Afghanistan and Iraq, both continue to rank low in global rankings of political freedom, with warlords continuing to hold power in Afghanistan with US support, and Iraqi communities more segregated today than before by gender and ethnicity as a result of the war.

=== The human cost of conflict in the Philippines ===
A study conducted by Amnesty International in 2008 measures the cost of conflict on a humanitarian scale. The report estimates a total of 120,000 deaths and a further 2 million displacements from the conflict in Mindanao over a period of 40 years. The report features individual accounts by some of the survivors of the conflict as well as aid workers and human rights activists, and hence it takes a more qualitative approach to the costs.

== See also ==
- Appeasement
- Deterrence
- Small Arms Survey
- Effects of war
