= Sokhna Benga =

Senegalese novelist and poet

- Born: December 12, 1967 (age 58); Dakar, Senegal
- Education: Cheikh Anta Diop University
- Occupations: Novelist, poet, editor
- Writing career
- Language: French
- Genres: Novel, poetry
- Notable works: Le dard du secret (1990); La balade du Sabador (2000); Waly Nguilane, le protégé de Roog (2004)
- Notable awards: Grand Prix of the Mayor of Dakar (1988); Grand Prix of the President (2000); Special Mention, Grand Prix of Black Africa (2001); Ordre des Arts et des Lettres (2004)

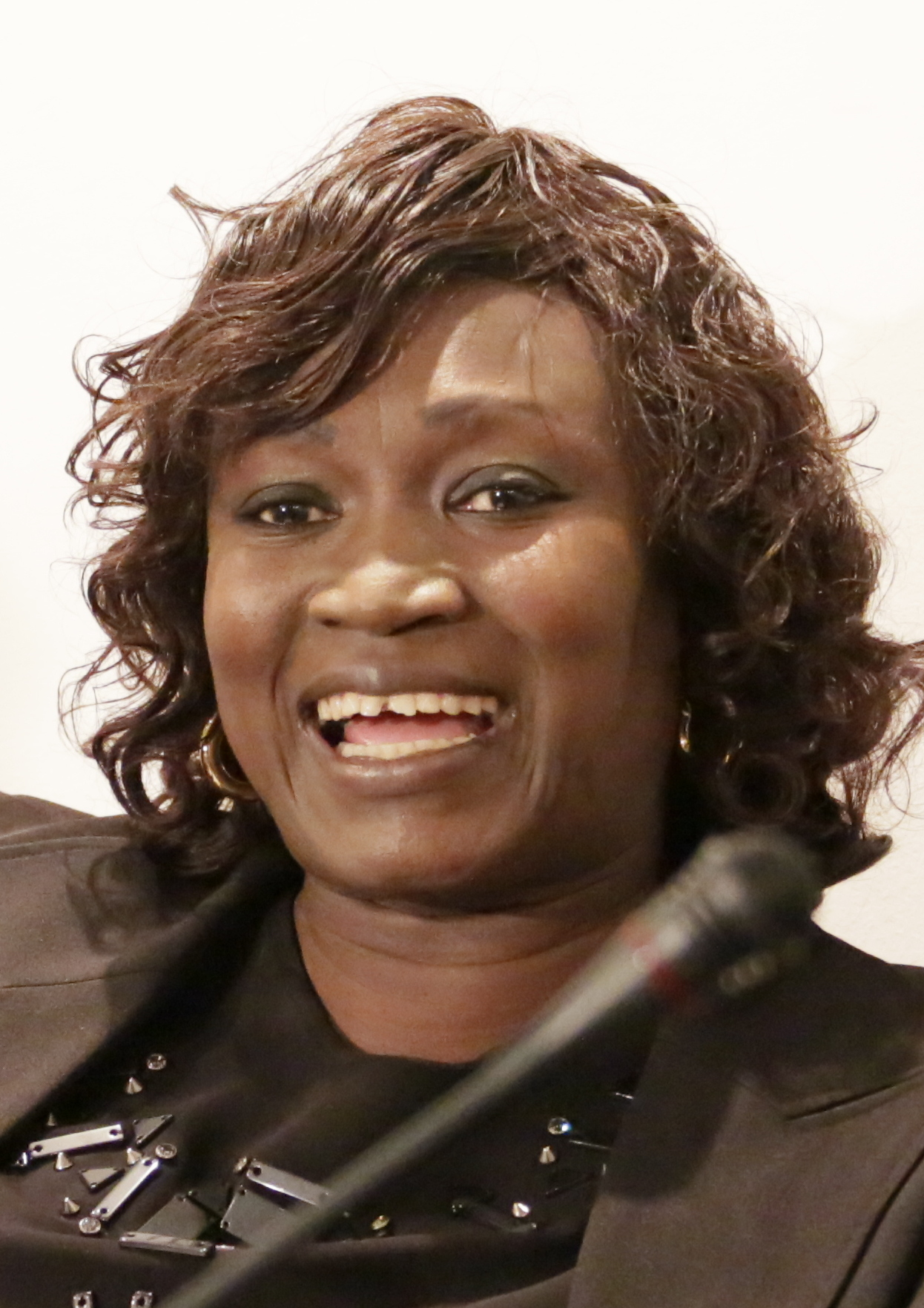
Sokhna Benga in 2013

Sokhna Benga (Mbengue) (born 12 December 1967, in Dakar) is a Senegalese novelist and poet. She writes in French.

== Biography ==
Sokhna Benga grew up in a Muslim family. She studied at Dakar University, Senegal, earning a master's degree in Business Law. She later went to France, where she obtained a DESS in Maritime Law and lived there for almost ten years. She joined humanitarian associations and worked with marginalized people, particularly students.

Returning to Dakar in 2001, she became literary director of the publishing house Nouvelles éditions africaines du Sénégal (NEAS).

She is a member of the Société des gens de lettres, la Maison des Ecrivains, the Senegalese writer's association (AES), and the French writers association (ADELF).

In 2004 she became a member of the French Ordre des Arts et des Lettres (Order of Arts and Letters).

== Works ==
- 2004: Waly NGuilane, le protégé de Roog (parts 1 & 2)
- 2003: La balade du Sabador - Grand Prix of the President 2000, Special Mention of the Grand Prix of Black Africa 2001).
- 1990: Le Dard du secret - Grand Prix of the Mayor of Dakar 1988.
