= Y'en a Marre =

Group of Senagalese influencers

Y'en a Marre ("Fed Up") is a group of Senegalese rappers and journalists, created in January 2011, to protest ineffective government and register youth to vote. They are credited with helping to mobilize Senegal's youth vote and oust incumbent President Abdoulaye Wade, though the group claims no affiliation with Macky Sall, Senegal's former president, or with any political party.

== Background ==
The group was founded by rappers Fou Malade ("Crazy Sick Guy", real name: Malal Talla), Thiat ("Junior", real name: Cheikh Oumar Cyrille Touré), Kilifeu (both from celebrated rap crew "Keur Gui of Kaolack") and journalists Sheikh Fadel Barro, Aliou Sane and Denise Sow. The movement was originally started in reaction to Dakar's frequent power cuts, but the group quickly concluded that they were "fed up" with an array of problems in Senegalese society.

== Activities ==
Through recordings, rallies and a network of regional affiliates, called "the spirit of Y'en a Marre", the group advocates for youth to embrace a new type of thinking and living termed "The New Type of Senegalese" or NTS. In late 2011, the collective released a compilation titled "Y'en A Marre", from which the single "Faux! Pas Forcé" emerged as a rallying cry for youth frustrated with President Wade and his son and presumed successor. They followed with a single, "Doggali" ("Let's finish"), which advocated for cleansing the country of Wade and son.

The group and their members campaigned door to door to register young Senegalese to vote and claim that more than 300,000 voters were registered with Y'en a Marre's assistance and urging. On February 16, 2012, three of the group's founders were arrested for helping to organize a sit-in at Dakar's Obelisk Square. Despite arrests, the group continued to organize protests up until the election that unseated Wade.

== Role in politics ==
Despite reaching the goal of ousting Wade, Y'en a Marre remains active, hosting meetings and shows, urging the new government to implement promised reforms, including reforms of land ownership, a key issue for Senegal's rural poor.

Y'en a Marre is particularly significant in Senegalese politics, because in his 2000 campaign, Abdoulaye Wade prominently featured the support of Senegalese rappers as a way of connecting with young voters. 12 years later, Y'en a Marre demonstrated that Senegal's youth were not unquestioningly loyal to Wade and were searching for a leader who could credibly promise reform.
