= Strategic Foresight Group =

Global affairs think tank in Mumbai, India

- Abbreviation: SFG
- Formation: 2002
- Type: Think tank
- Headquarters: Mumbai, India
- Location: India
- President: Sundeep Waslekar
- Website: strategicforesight.com

Strategic Foresight Group (SFG) is a think tank based in India that works on global issues. It was established in 2002.

SFG has worked with governments and national institutions of 60 countries from around the world. It produces scenarios and policy concepts that have been discussed in the United Nations Security Council, Parliament of India, the European Parliament, Oxford University, Cambridge University, House of Commons of the United Kingdom, House of Lords, World Bank, World Economic Forum, United Nations Alliance of Civilizations, and others.

Sundeep Waslekar is the President of Strategic Foresight Group. Ilmas Futehally is the Vice President and Executive Director.

== History ==
The founding of SFG coincided with a period of oscillating developments in India-Pakistan relations. SFG produced an assessment of the cost of conflict between the two countries. India's then External Affairs Minister Yashwant Sinha, in a suo moto letter addressed to the President of SFG, described it as a valuable tool for the practitioners of foreign policy. SFG went on to undertake a similar exercise for Sri Lanka. This report too attracted considerable attention. In 2005, its report, The Final Settlement created a public debate; for the first time it identified the centrality of the water dimension in the India-Pakistan relations. It was translated into Urdu as well as Marathi.

While SFG focused on South Asia including India, in its initial period, it has since widened the scope of its work to address terrorism, clash of civilizations, cost of conflict, water security and global governance issues.

In 2004, SFG convened a roundtable to prepare a common intellectual framework for deconstructing terror. Since then SFG has been invited by Prime Ministers, Ministers of Foreign Affairs and governments of several countries in North America, Europe, Asia and the Middle East for policy consultations. In June 2005, SFG and the Alliance of Liberals and Democrats in Europe, jointly convened a roundtable at the European Parliament, Brussels, involving serving and former cabinet ministers and parliamentarians from the Middle East and Europe. The roundtable adopted the Brussels Consensus on the principles and policies for a safer world. At the roundtable, Dr. Wolfgang Gerhardt, Chairman of the Friedrich Naumann Foundation, said "Strategic Foresight Group has a track record in exploring value-based working solutions to the problems of society. This is their intention here (at the 3rd Roundtable). It is also our intention at the FNSt."

== 2006–2007: West-Islam relations ==
The Third International Roundtable was organised by Strategic Foresight Group and the Alliance of Liberals and Democrats for Europe at the European Parliament, Brussels, on 26–27 November 2006. The Roundtable was endorsed by the League of Arab States. It engaged important public institutions from the Western and Islamic worlds.

About 40 leaders from Europe, Asia and the Middle East participated in the Roundtable. They included serving cabinet ministers, former ministers, leaders of parliamentary groups, special envoys of the heads of multilateral organisations and directors of important institutions. The distinguished group recommended an Inclusive Semi Permanent Conference on Peace in the Middle East, Western Islamic Dialogue and Engagement Initiative, International Historical Study Group on Common Human Civilisation, Arab Islamic Renaissance Initiative and the promotion of the Compact of Dialogue-Democracy-Development. The Roundtable welcomed the Report of the High Level Group of the Alliance of Civilizations of the United Nations.

At the beginning of 2007 Strategic Foresight Group brought out its global research report An Inclusive World: in which the West, Islam and the Rest have a stake. Prof Shlomo Ben-Ami, former Foreign Minister of Israel describes this "as the most comprehensive approach to solve the crisis of our time that has ever been proposed." Prof Kamel Abu Jaber, former Foreign Minister of Jordan, calls it "hope in an otherwise hopeless international system." The philosophy of An Inclusive World could be subject of a new global debate to overcome the divides at the beginning of the 21st century. The report was debated by Oxford University at one of the famous Oxford Union debates in May. It also featured three times in the debates at the House of Commons. The European Parliament and the League of Arab States circulated it widely among their members. It was translated into Arabic by the Bibliotheca Alexandrina based in Alexandria, Egypt.

Speaking on the Middle East at the World Economic Forum's Middle East Summit, Sundeep Waslekar said that the region's primary risk is a "triple deficit" – a democratization deficit combined with a development deficit leads to a dignity deficit, often manifested in instability and violence.

One of the main conclusions of the Third International Roundtable was a proposal for the Inclusive Semi Permanent Conference for the Middle East. In 2008 SFG brought out a position paper on this subject, which was launched at the House of Lords in May 2008.

== 2008: Peace and Security ==
In 2008, SFG continued its work in the Cost of conflict series, this time focussing on the Middle East, in alignment with its other work. The report on Cost of Conflict in the Middle East was launched at the United Nations office in Geneva in January 2009. It featured in floor debates in the House of Commons and House of Lords. It was discussed by a panel of ministers and senior diplomats at the United Nations Alliance of Civilizations when the latter hosted its forum in Istanbul in April 2009. The report was also discussed at the World Economic Forum Middle East summit at the Dead Sea in May 2009. It has since featured in several hundred newspapers, websites and blogs.

In 2008, SFG came out with a report on 20 trends that would affect global security and economy in the next 20 years.

In June 2008, SFG expanded the scope of its work with an international conference on Responsibility to the Future. It was co-hosted by the United Nations Global Compact, inaugurated by the President of India and attended by experts from 25 countries. Following the recommendations of the conference, SFG decided to address issues of water security in Asia and the Middle East.

== 2009–2014: Water security ==
In 2009, SFG decided to focus on preventing conflicts arising out of resource scarcity, with focus on water.

An international workshop on Water Stress and Climate Change in the Himalayan River Basins was organised in August 2009 in Kathmandu bringing together experts and policy makers on water issues from China, Nepal, Bangladesh and India. The Second International Workshop was held in Dhaka in January 2010. It resulted in the Dhaka Declaration on Water Security.

The Dhaka Declaration highlights the significance of the rivers that flow from the Himalayas and the urgent need for cooperation between Basin countries. It has been predicted that due to the combined effect of melting of glaciers, extreme weather events and pollution, the rivers in the Eastern Himalayas will lose their flow from anywhere from 5 to 20 percent by 2050. This will have affect river flows mostly in the lean period, undermining plans to produce hydroelectricity and promote inland water navigation in the region.

The Dhaka Declaration proposes an exchange of scientific data, particularly in the low flow period and joint research projects. It underscores the risk of conflicts due to water scarcity and floods leading to migration on a large scale. A report titled The Himalayan Challenge: Water Security in Emerging Asia was published in June 2010. This report is the first of its kind which evaluates future water balance and risks in India, China, Nepal and Bangladesh until the year 2030. A second report titled Himalayan Solutions was published in January 2011.

In February 2010, an international initiative on Water Security in the Middle East was launched at Montreux, Switzerland, on 15–16 February, with two workshops attracting the participation of 60 leading policymakers, including members of Parliament, former Cabinet Ministers, senior leaders of Water Commissions and heads of research institutions from across the Middle East. In preparation for the workshops, SFG had held consultations with leaders in the Middle East, and distinguished experts from several countries in the region. A workshop was held in Sanliurfa, a town in Turkey close to the Syrian border to discuss collaborative solutions to the issue of water security in the Middle East. Participants at the level of former Ministers and heads of Departments in Water Ministries participated in the workshop. A report titled The Blue Peace: Rethinking Middle East Water was launched by the President of Switzerland, Micheline Calmy-Rey.

In April 2012, a High-Level Group was established under the Chairmanship of HRH Prince Hassan bin Talal of Jordan.

In 2012, SFG began addressing the issue of sustainable and collaborative solutions to the Nile River Basin in Africa. The Nile has been governed by agreements that date back to colonial times and give Egypt and Sudan majority share of water. The Nile Basin Countries have drafted a new Cooperative Framework Agreement (CFA) to replace the old agreements. This has created tensions between riparian countries. SFG organised a workshop in Zurich in early 2012 bringing together members of parliaments, diplomats and scholars from these regions to discuss current and future prospects for the River. It published a report Blue Peace for the Nile which was launched on 22 March 2013, that also happens to be World Water Day.

SFG has developed the concept of Mega Arc of Hydro Insecurity, spanning from Vietnam and Thailand in the East across China, Nepal, India, Pakistan, Afghanistan to the Middle East and Turkey and further downwards from Egypt to Tanzania.

HRH Hassan bin Talal, Chairman of the United Nations Secretary General’s Advisory Board on Water and Sanitation launched the SFG report Water Cooperation for a Secure World in Amman on 28 November 2013. The report examines for the first time the relationship between water and peace around the world and is based on the study of 148 countries and 205 shared river basins. It concludes that any two nations engaged in active water cooperation do not go to war. Out of the 148 countries covered, 37 countries are not engaged in any significant degree of cooperation with their neighbouring countries. These 37 countries also face the risk of war.

In the report, SFG developed a new Water Cooperation Quotient, which is a measure of active cooperation by riparian countries in the management of water resources using 10 parameters including legal, political, technical, environmental, economic and institutional aspects. It is calculated on a scale of 0 to 100, with 100 being the best performance.

SFG also launched the report Rivers of Peace - Restructuring India-Bangladesh Relations in 2013. This report provides a new formula to resolve the impasse over the Teesta River Agreement between India and Bangladesh.

A major breakthrough in developing consensus between multiple stakeholder representatives of Iraq and Turkey on a Plan of Action for promoting exchange and calibration of data and standards pertaining to Tigris river flows was achieved at a meeting organised by SFG in 2014. The outcome of the meeting which was held in Geneva has been referred to as the "Geneva Consensus On Tigris River".

The first annual High-Level Forum on Blue Peace in the Middle East at Istanbul in September 2014. About 90 policymakers, Members of Parliament, serving and former Ministers, media leaders, academics and water experts from across the Middle East came together for this event. Participants proposed concrete initiatives at bilateral as well as regional levels to promote cooperation and sustainable management of water resources in the region.

In March 2015, SFG launched two reports: The Hydro-Insecure: Crisis of Survival in the Middle East and Water and Violence: Crisis of Survival in the Middle East, which highlight the challenges of water security and the larger effect it has on the region.

For instance, the reports highlight that water insecurity is always accompanied by one or more issues such as poverty, war and conflict, low women's development and environmental degradation. According to the 'Hydro Insecure: Crisis of Survival in the Middle East' report, 40 million people are hydro-insecure, out of the total population of Iraq, Syria, Jordan, Lebanon, Turkey, which is roughly 140 million.

SFG also analyses major global changes and shares perspectives at international conferences.

== 2015-2020: Global Water ==
The Global High-Level Panel on Water and Peace was launched in Geneva in 2015. It was co-convened by 15 countries and chaired by Danilo Turk, the former president of Slovenia and former Assistant Secretary-General of the United Nations. Strategic Foresight Group was selected to help the Panel in developing political and substantive recommendations. The Panel launched its report in September 2017 which advocates a number of specific recommendations on protecting water infrastructure in conflict zones, preferential and concessional finance for trans-boundary water projects, new mechanisms for hydro-diplomacy.

After the report was launched, Strategic Foresight Group played a role in implementing the recommendations of the report, especially those relating to protection of water infrastructure in conflict zones and financing of joint water infrastructure. Strategic Foresight Group also produced the Blue Peace Bulletin that helped further disseminate the recommendations of the Global High-Level Panel on Water and Peace.

== Since 2014: Critical Global Challenges ==
SFG is addressing major paradigm shifts due to major scientific, technological, environmental, economic, social, and political factors.

In 2011, SFG published a document titled Big Questions of Our Time which addresses issues that will affect humanity in the next 50 years, approximately until 2060. It has since been involved in analysing critical global challenges and linkages between them.

In 2016, Strategic Foresight Group briefed the historic United Nations Security Council in New York City. It was for the first time that the UNSC had convened an open debate on "water, peace and security". SFG President Sundeep Waslekar was one of the four briefers along with UN Secretary-General Ban Ki-moon, Chairman of the Global High-Level Panel on Water and Peace Danilo Türk and ICRC Vice President Christine Beerli.

In 2017, Strategic Foresight Group launched the second edition of the Water Cooperation Quotient, a rare document analyzing water cooperation in all of the world's shared river basins. The InterAction Council of Former Heads of State and Government provided the Foreword, authored by its two co-chairs, Mr Bertie Ahern, former Prime Minister of Ireland and President Olusegun Obasanjo, former President of Nigeria.

== See also ==
- Democracy in India
- List of think tanks in India
