= Alvaro Umaña =

Costa Rican academic, environmentalist and politician

Alvaro Umaña-Quesada

Minister of Natural Resources, Energy and Mines
- In office 1986–1990

Personal details
- Born: 1951 or 1952 (age 73–74)

Alvaro Umaña-Quesada (born 1951 or 1952) is a Costa Rican academic, environmentalist, and politician who served as Minister of Natural Resources, Energy and Mines from 1986 to 1990. He is credited for pursuing successful environmental policies which promoted conservation and reversed the country's high deforestation rates. He stars in the film, Paved Paradise, released in the Netherlands in 2023.

== Education ==
Umaña has a BSc in physics and an MSc in environmental pollution control from Pennsylvania State University. He has a master’s in economics and a PhD in environmental engineering and science from Stanford University.

== Environment minister ==
By the 1980's, Costa Rica had one of the worst records of deforestation in Central America. Alvaro Umaña recognised that successful conservation required cooperation and support from local communities. When Óscar Arias became president in 1986, he created a cabinet-level Ministry of Environment, Energy and Mines (Spanish: Ministerio de Recursos Naturales, Energía y Minas), and appointed Umaña as its first head. The purpose of the new ministry was to bring together disparate environmental agencies, to clarify their jurisdictional boundaries, and to improve coordination between the agencies. Under Umaña the National Parks department shifted its focus from merely natural protection to the idea of sustainable development and the need to include local people in the economic benefits of the parks.

Umaña developed a system of regional conservation units (Spanish: Unidades Regionales de Conservación) to incorporate all of the biological reserves, forest reserves, wildlife refuges, and indigenous reserves within each regional unit. A key part of this strategy was linking core protected areas with surrounding buffer lands, and encouraging local participation in conservation measures. Each regional conservation unit included community input from people who lived in and around the protected areas as well as input from park personnel.

Umaña developed systems of financial compensation in the form of grants and favorable loans to give up low-yielding livestock farming to especially small and medium-sized farmers. To scale up these programs, Umaña developed a series of financial initiatives and sought new funding for conservation from overseas. The latter involved "debt-for-nature swaps" beginning with a deal agreed with the Netherlands in 1988 in which the Netherlands wrote off debts in exchange for Costa Rica using the corresponding amount to restore and preserve forests.

Umaña promoted what he called an 'aggressive' and 'ambitious' reforestation program in the denuded countryside, which helped to prevent soil erosion and restore farmland. In his first year as minister nearly 15,000 acres were reforested. In February 1988, Umaña announced results of a satellite survey of Costa Rica's forests, which showed that only five years of commercial timber remained outside of the country's forest reserves. The cause of the destruction was logging and pasture expansion. Much of the logging was illegal, and involved the felling of trees within national parks, in which logs were hauled out of the parks at night, or were hidden under beds of agricultural produce, and aided by the widespread use of forged logging permits. The following year the government declared a state of emergency: this involved the suspension of all logging permits outside of private plantations, and a ban on the export of unfinished timber products. Government funds were increased to the Rural Guard to improve enforcement.

Umaña also helped create the Instituto Nacional de Biodiversidad, (English: National Biodiversity Institute) to catalogue Costa Rica's biological diversity, and to identify ways in which the country's environmental wealth could aid economic development.

== Other work ==
Umaña was also director and founder of the Natural Resources Program of the Instituto Centroamericano de Administracion de Empresas in Alajuela.

Umaña has been the director of the Environmentally Sustainable Development Group at the United Nations Development Programme in New York. He was founding member and chair of the World Bank's Inspection Panel, and has served on the boards of the Rockefeller Foundation, the Arias Foundation for Peace and Human Progress, the UNESCO Executive Council, the World Resources Institute, and the Stockholm Environment Institute. He co-founded Climate Transparency in 2014, and is a Co-Chair.
