= Cheikh Bamba Dièye =

Senegalese politician

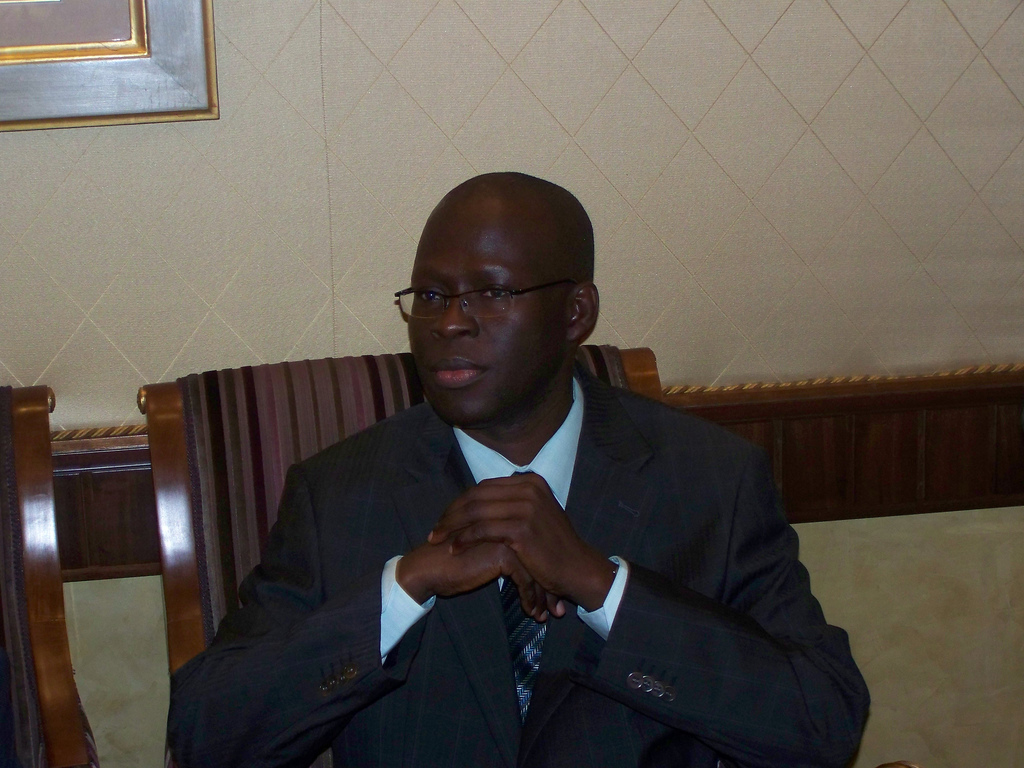
- Cheikh Bamba Dièye at the National Conference of Senegal in Dakar

Minister of Regional Planning and Local Government of Senegal
- Incumbent
- Assumed office 5 April 2012
- President: Macky Sall

Personal details
- Party: Front for Socialism and Democracy/Benno Jubël

Cheikh Bamba Dieye is a Senegalese politician who has served in the government of Senegal as Minister of Regional Planning and Local Government since April 2012. Previously he was Mayor of Saint-Louis, Senegal, as well as a Deputy in the National Assembly of Senegal; he was also a candidate in the 2012 presidential election. Cheikh Bamba Dièye is a member of the political party Front for Socialism and Democracy/Benno Jubël.

== Life, education and professional career ==
Cheikh Bamba Dieye was born on November 12, 1965, in Santhiaba, a district of Saint-Louis. He is married with four daughters. His father was Cheikh Abdoulaye Dièye, the former leader of FSD/BJ, who greatly admired the teachings of Cheikh Ahmadou Bamba.

Cheikh Bamba Dièye was educated at the secondary technical school André Peytavin in Saint-Louis. In 1987, he received his bachelor's degree from the college of Saint-Michel in Dakar. Five years later, he became an engineer at the National School of Public Works in Algiers. Dieye specializes in transportation, focusing on planning and environmental economics.

Dieye is the director of Delta Engineering, a project management company specializing in micro finance. A Journalist in his spare time, Dieye managed several newspapers, including "Alternatives," with a monthly circulation of 15,000 copies.

Cheikh Bamba Dieye is a founding member of the Front for Socialism and Democracy / Benno Jubel (FSD/BJ). He was elected regional councilor in 1996. From 1996 to 2002, he served as spokesman for the party until the accidental death of his father. It was only after this event that he was made director by the party congress of the National School of Health and Social Development on June 9, 2002.

He was elected to the Senegalese Parliament in 2007, then elected mayor of St. Louis in the 2009 election as a member of Benno Siggil Senegal, a political party of which he is a founding member.

== Political activism ==
=== Political engagement ===
In 1990, in a climate of national malaise and generalized political dispute, Sheikh Abiboulaye Dièye created in Saint Louis the "Front Sewe sa Dekk." Cheikh Bamba Dieye was a member of this movement which was intended to defend the interests of Saint-Louis. He was 25 years old at this time.

In Response to electoral code provisions preventing independent candidates in local elections, the founding members of the "Front Sewe sa Dekk" decided to transform the movement into a political party, entitled the Front for Socialism and Democracy / Benno Jubbel in 1996. Cheikh Bamba Dieye helped his father complete all administrative procedures for the creation of the party and was subsequently made spokesman.

=== Secretary general of FSD/BJ ===
In 2002, after the death of the founder of the party, the SDF/BJ nearly perished. In 2002, Sheikh Bamba Dieye called party members to the National School of Health and Social Development to try and revive the party. Only a dozen people were there. After the vote, Cheikh Bamba Dieye was elected Secretary General, beating his opponent by a large majority.

== Mayor of Saint Louis ==
Cheikh Bamba Dieye was a regional councilor in Saint Louis from 1995 to 2001 before being elected head of the FSD/BJ in 2002. In 2007 he was elected to the National Assembly of Senegal, then in 2009 was elected mayor of St. Louis.

During his tenure as mayor, the city of St. Louis pioneered open government in Senegal. Key decisions, spending, jobs and the budget of the municipality are available to all Senegalese. This information is available and updated periodically on the city's website.

== Distinction ==
Cheikh Bamba Dièye was a guest of the U.S. government's Foreign Visitors program.

He was a guest of honor at the ISDR (International Strategy for Disaster Reduction in Geneva, as a result of his fight against global warming and desert encroachment.

He periodically assists in African Union (AU) missions regarding the supervision of elections in several African countries.

== See also ==
- List of mayors of Saint-Louis, Senegal
- Timeline of Saint-Louis, Senegal
