= Amsatou Sow Sidibé =

Senegal academic, lawyer and politician

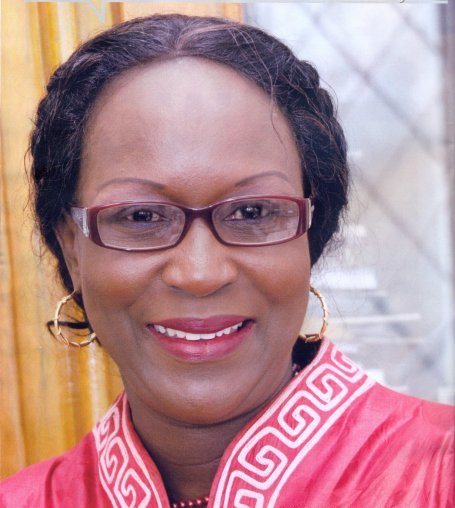
- Born: 1953 (age 72–73)
- Occupations: academic, politician

Amsatou Sow Sidibé (born 1953) is an academic, lawyer and politician from Senegal. In 2012, she was the country's first female presidential candidate. Sidibé is a law professor at Cheikh Anta Diop University (University of Dakar), where she serves as director of the Institute for Human Rights and Peace. She also founded and has served as president of the African Network for the Promotion of African Women Workers (RAFET), based in Dakar.

In her various roles, Sidibé has diplomatically advocated for women's health, education and gender equality, helping to craft legislation around violence against women and to orchestrate Senegal's gender parity law in 2010, which requires political parties in local and national elections to have women for at least half of their candidates. Sidibé stated, "Women talk about parity everywhere, even in the bush," and has said, "They need to be at the highest level for decisions; that is important."

Sidibé attended Université Paris II, where she earned a doctorate in law and political science.
