= Doudou Ndoye =

Senegalese lawyer and politician

Doudou Ndoye (born August 4, 1944) is a Senegalese lawyer and politician who served in the government of Senegal as Minister of Justice from 1983 to 1986. He is the Secretary-General of the Union for the Republic (UPR), a political party he founded in 2000, and was a candidate in the 2007 presidential election.

== Biography ==
Ndoye was born in Dakar. He was a founding member of the Senegalese Democratic Party (PDS), but on December 31, 1981 he resigned from the PDS, in which he had held the position of National Secretary in charge of relations with the party's internal organs, and joined the ruling Socialist Party (PS). As a member of the Socialist Party, he became Administrative Secretary to the Political Bureau before serving in the government as Minister of Justice under President Abdou Diouf from April 8, 1983 to January 2, 1986.

He has published several books on legal matters. He is the founder and publishing manager of African Legal Editions, as well as the founder of EDJA. Since 1983, he has been affiliated with the Institut international de droit d’expression et d’inspiration françaises and Lawyers Without Borders (Avocats sans frontiere).

In the February 2007 presidential election, Ndoye placed 12th out of 15 candidates with 0.29% of the vote.
