= Cheikh Anta Diop University =

Public university in Dakar, Senegal

Coordinates: 14°41′13″N 17°27′48″W

- Université Cheikh Anta Diop
- Former name: University of Dakar (until 30 March 1987)
- Motto: "Lux Mea Lex"
- Type: Public
- Established: 24 February 1957; 69 years ago
- Endowment: Yearly state budget: 2006: $US32 million
- Rector: Alioune Badara KANDJI
- Academic staff: 1,422
- Administrative staff: 1562
- Students: 86,188
- Location: Dakar, Dakar Region, Senegal
- Campus: UCAD, BP 5005 Dakar
- Website: www.ucad.sn

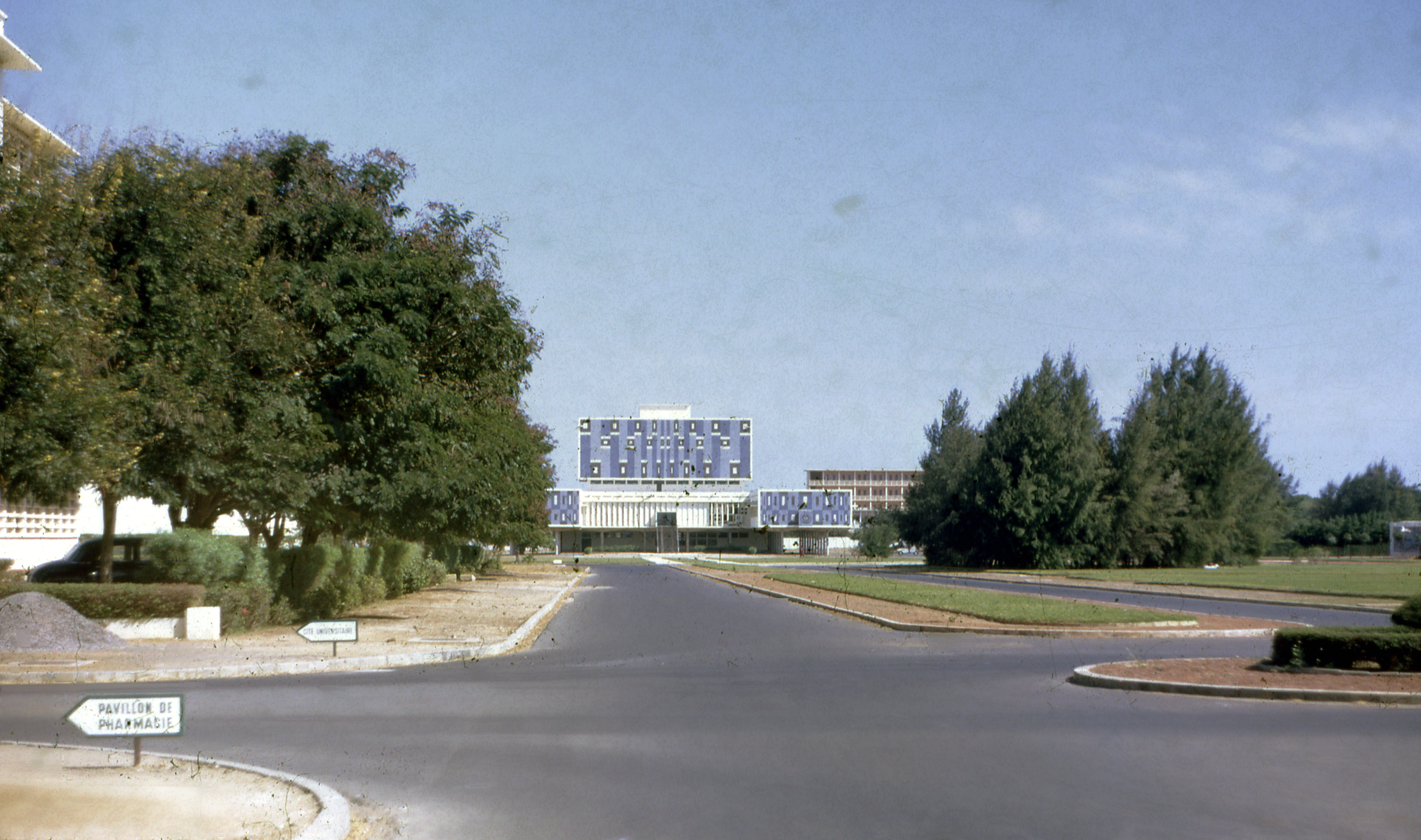
Cheikh Anta Diop University campus, 1967. The original library building at center.

Cheikh Anta Diop University (UCAD) (French: Université Cheikh Anta Diop), is a university in Dakar, Senegal. It is named after the Senegalese physicist, historian and anthropologist Cheikh Anta Diop and has an enrollment of over 60,000.

== History ==
Cheikh Anta Diop University predates Senegalese independence and grew out of several French institutions set up by the colonial administration. In 1918, the French created the "école africaine de médecine" (African medical school), mostly to serve white and mixed race students but also open to the small educated elite of the four free towns of Senegal with nominal French citizenship. In 1936, under the Popular Front government in France, Dakar became home to the Institut Fondamental d'Afrique Noire (IFAN), an institute for the study of African culture.

In 1950s, with decolonisation already looming, the French administration expanded these schools, added science faculties, and combined the schools into the "Institut des Hautes Etudes de Dakar". In 1957, a new campus was constructed as the 18th French Public University, attached to the University of Paris and the University of Bordeaux. This became the University of Dakar the largest and most prestigious university in French West Africa. In 1987, its name was changed to honor the Senegalese philosopher and anthropologist, Cheikh Anta Diop.

=== Enrollment growth ===
At independence in 1960, the total enrollment was 1,018 students, of whom only 39% were Senegalese, with the rest coming from other former French colonies. By 1976, this number grew to 8,014.

In the 1970s, due to a national financial crisis, funding to higher education was cut and international agencies assisted with the costs over the next decade. Most of this funding, though, went to meet the needs of primary schools instead. In the 1990s and 2000s there was a large growth in Senegalese primary and secondary education, much of it funded through international projects. In 1984 only around 50% of Senegalese children received primary education, while in 2004 more than 90% did.

In the mid-1980s around 20% of World Bank funding towards Senegalese education went to higher education, but this figure dropped to 7% by the mid-1990s. With these projects came severe World Bank restrictions, which cut domestic funding available to university programs. 9,000~ Senegalese students received a Baccalaureate degree in 2000, and university registration shot above 40,000, despite the campus only having a capacity of 5,000 dorm rooms.

Despite these pressures Cheikh Anta Diop University maintains a reputation as one of Africa's most prestigious institutions. Most of Senegal's post-independence leaders are graduates of the university, and its alumni teach in universities around the world.

== Academics ==
The education system follows the French pattern, with oral and/or written final exams administered at the end of the year. All courses at the university are taught in French, except those in language departments other than French.

=== Schools and institutes ===
UCAD offers courses of study in Humanities, Sciences, Engineering, Medicine, Finance, Accounting, and Law. The university awards the following degrees: B.A., B.S., Ph.D., and D.M.A.

The School of Medicine includes departments of Pharmacy, Research, and Surgery. The university also encompasses the Institute of Sciences of the Environment (ISE) and the Institute of Sciences of Earth (ISE).

The Institut Fondamental d'Afrique Noire (IFAN), founded in 1936, remains one of the world centers of African Studies. The IFAN Museum of African Arts' Musée d'Art africain, attached to IFAN, displays and conserves a world-renowned collection of African arts.

The Centre de linguistique appliquée de Dakar (Center of Applied Linguistics of Dakar) at CADU is the regulatory body for the Wolof language.

Language studies are divided into the following disciplines: Philosophy, Sociology, History, Geography, Letters, Arabic, Russian, Languages and Civilizations, English, Spanish, Portuguese, Italian, Latin, German and Linguistics.

The university oversees a language school: Institut de Français pour Etrangers (IFE). The IFE specializes in French language studies aimed at foreign students in preparation for regular courses taught in French.

=== Foreign programs ===
UCAD hosts a number of foreign study abroad programs, including ones administered by Wells College, Indiana University, and the University of Oregon in the United States and numerous European universities. Participants in the program typically take a required course in Introductory Wolof and a French language (if applicable) course through the IFE in addition to regular university courses taught in French.

A division of the university offers courses for foreign students in Senegalese and African studies, including African literature, history, politics, philosophy, and sociology.

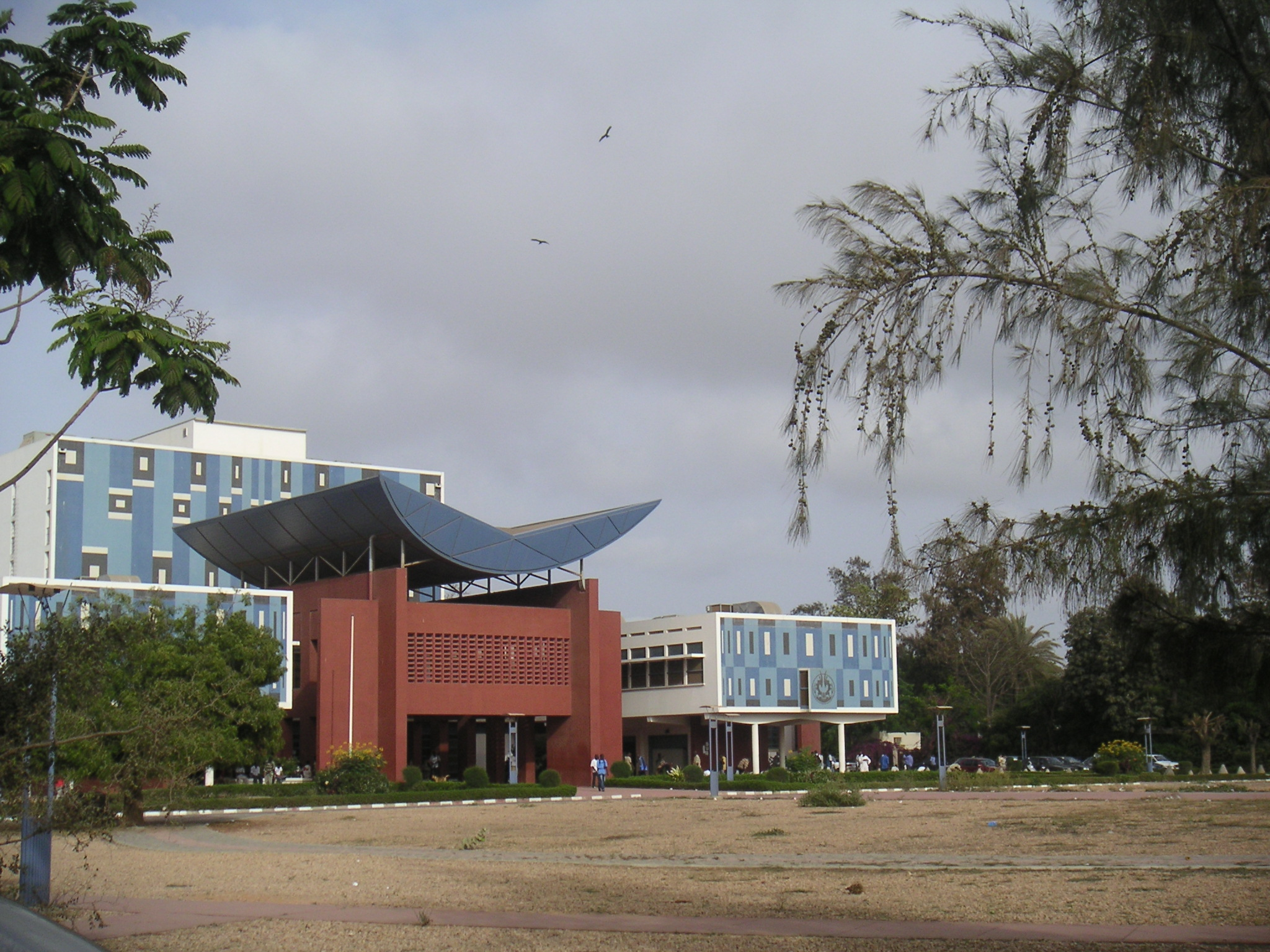
Cheikh Anta Diop University library building, showing additions, 2005.

CADU is a member of the Federation of the Universities of the Islamic World.

==== Special requirements ====
For foreign students, UCAD requires a minimum age of 18 to enroll in studies in pharmacy and a minimum age of 22 to enroll in studies relating to oral surgery.

== Student life ==
UCAD has a diverse student body drawn from many countries including Senegal, Chad, Burkina-Faso, Ivory Coast, France, Togo, Benin, Nigeria, the United States, Mauritania, Mali, Morocco, Rwanda, Cameroon, Belgium, and the United Kingdom.

As with a number of other African universities, UCAD occasionally experiences student strikes protesting government or university policies, most notable of which occurred during the 1993 presidential election.

With over 60,000 students and only 5,000 dormitory rooms, most students from outside Dakar must look for other accommodations. Many students live in the Cité Aline Sitoe Diatta, near the university campus, and those who can't afford Dakar's often high rents often share rooms.

== Violence ==
The university has had a number of notable incidents of violence. A Senegalese LGBT organization noted in 2016 that ten cases of homophobic mob violence had occurred at the university since 2012. One of these, following a riot at the university, resulted in the death of the student who was suspected to be gay. The riot followed an attempt to apprehend the student, who had sought refuge in the university's bank and security office. Separately, self-immolations and clashes between students and police have been reported after students unsuccessfully demanded scholarships or challenged grading schemes.

== Notable alumni and professors ==
=== Notable instructors ===
- Abdoulaye Bathily, former government minister and President candidate, Professor of History.
- Souleymane Bachir Diagne, Senegalese philosopher, former Vice-dean of the College of Humanities and Professor of Philosophy.
- Souleymane Mboup, microbiologist, leader of team that discovered HIV-2, and leads the Bacteriology-Virology Laboratory at le Dantec Hospital.
- Amsatou Sow Sidibé, Senegalese lawyer and presidential candidate
- Khady Sylla, Senegalese novelist
- Louis-Vincent Thomas, French sociologist, anthropologist, ethnologist, former professor.
- Abdoulaye Wade, former President of Senegal, former dean of the law and economics faculty.

=== Notable students ===
- Simeon Aké, former Ivorian Foreign Minister and UN Ambassador.
- Barthélémy Attisso, guitarist and lawyer
- Sangaré Niamoto Ba, Minister of Mali
- Sékou Ba, former Burkina Faso Minister of Animal Resources
- Sokhna Benga, Senegalese novelist and poet
- Emmanuel Bombande, cofounder and executive director of the West Africa Network for Peacebuilding, chair of the Board of the Global Partnership for the Prevention of Armed Conflict
- Yayi Boni, President of Benin.
- Ousmane Camara, former Senegalese Chief Justice.
- Awa Marie Coll-Seck, former Senegalese Minister of Health.
- Mbaye Diagne, Senegalese Army officer and a United Nations military observer credited with saving many lives during the 1994 Rwandan genocide.
- Souleymane Bachir Diagne (Philosophy), professor at Columbia University.
- Salif Diallo, Master of Law, Burkinabé political leader.
- Cheick Sidi Diarra, United Nations Special Adviser on Africa and High Representative for the Least Developed Countries, Landlocked Developing Countries and Small Island Developing States (OSAA/OHRLLS).
- Ousmane Tanor Dieng:, International Relations, Law; first Secretary of the Socialist Party of Senegal, vice-president of the Socialist International.
- Abdou Diouf, 2nd President of Senegal
- Mamadou Diouf, historian of Cayor, former CADU professor, and director of African Studies at Columbia University.
- Adebayo Faleti, Nigerian Poet, Writer and Actor.
- Ibrahima Fall (politician): former Foreign Minister and professor of Law
- Awa Fall-Diop (activist): human rights activist
- Teguest Guerma, Medical Post-Doctorate, associate director of the HIV/AIDS Department, of the World Health Organization.
- Ibrahim Boubacar Keïta, President of Mali
- Souleymane Mboup, microbiologist and leader of team that discovered HIV-2
- Molly Melching, Human rights activist.
- Kanidoua Naboho, Doctor of Medicine, Burkinabé political leader.
- Doudou Ndoye, Senegalese politician (Law)
- Erin Pizzey, activist and founder of world's first domestic violence shelter.
- Jean Pliya, Beninois playwright and short story writer.
- Théodore-Adrien Sarr, Archbishop of Dakar, licentiate in Greek & Latin.
- Talla Sylla, Senegalese politician, leader of APJ
- Soham El Wardini, mayor of Dakar (first female to be mayor post-independence)
- Marie Khemesse Ngom Ndiaye, doctor and health minister
- Binta Sarr, women's rights activist and founder of the Association for the Advancement of Senegalese Women
- Karfa Diallo, activist and writer, founder of the Mémoires & Partages association

=== Honorary degrees ===
- Nelson Mandela: Honorary Doctorate conferred, 30 June 1992

== See also ==
- Gaston Berger University, Saint Louis, Senegal
- Universities in Africa
- Education in Senegal
- WARC
- List of universities in Senegal
