= Place de l'Obélisque =

Central plaza in Dakar, Senegal

Coordinates: 14.694°N 17.448°W

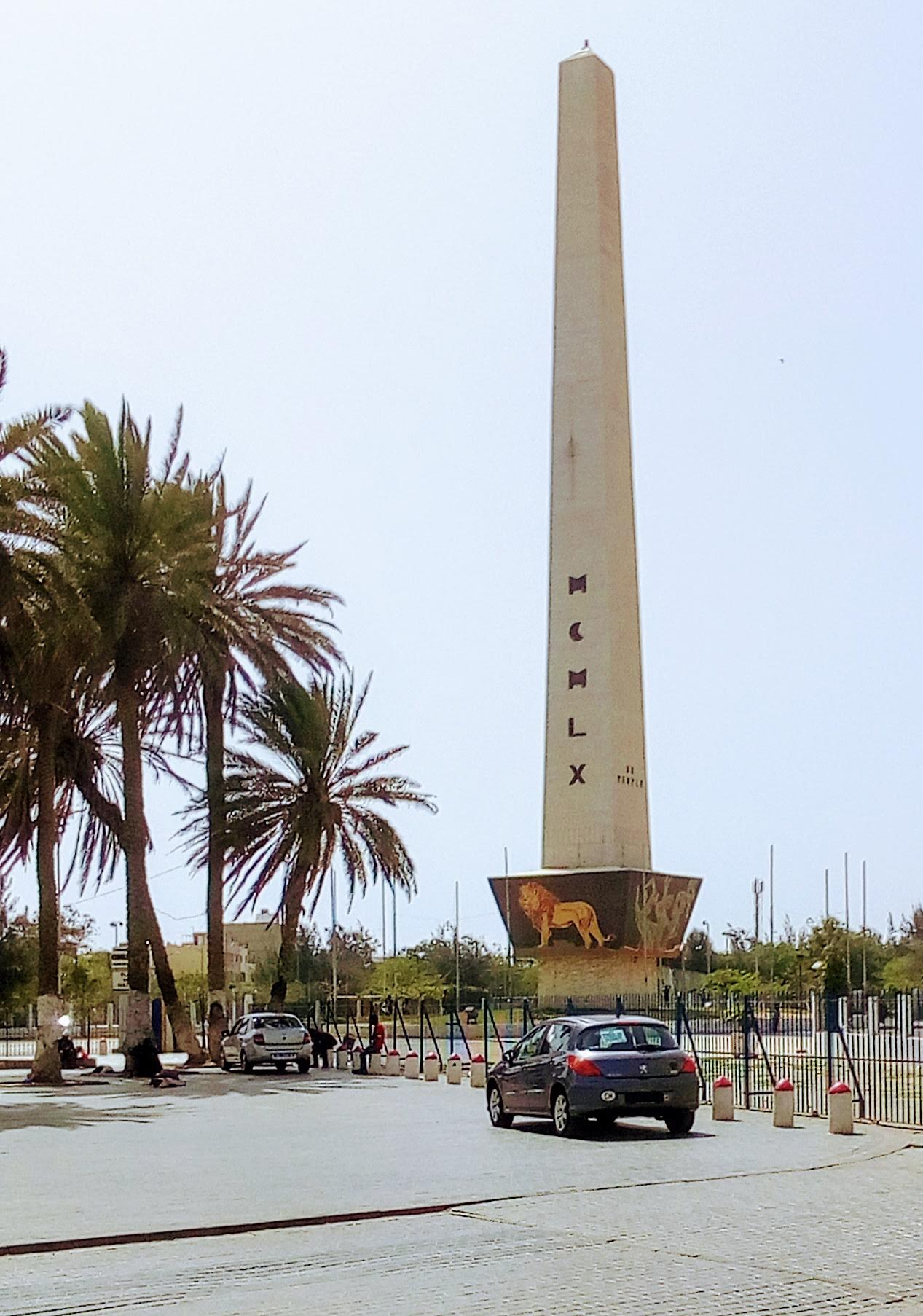

General information
- Location: Médina, Dakar, Senegal

The Place de l'Obélisque (Obelisk Square) is a central plaza in Dakar, Senegal.

== History ==
It is an important site for protests, demonstrations, parades, and other events. The plaza's obelisk, which is adorned with the Roman numerals MCMLX, commemorates Senegal's 1960 independence from France.
