= History of Senegal =

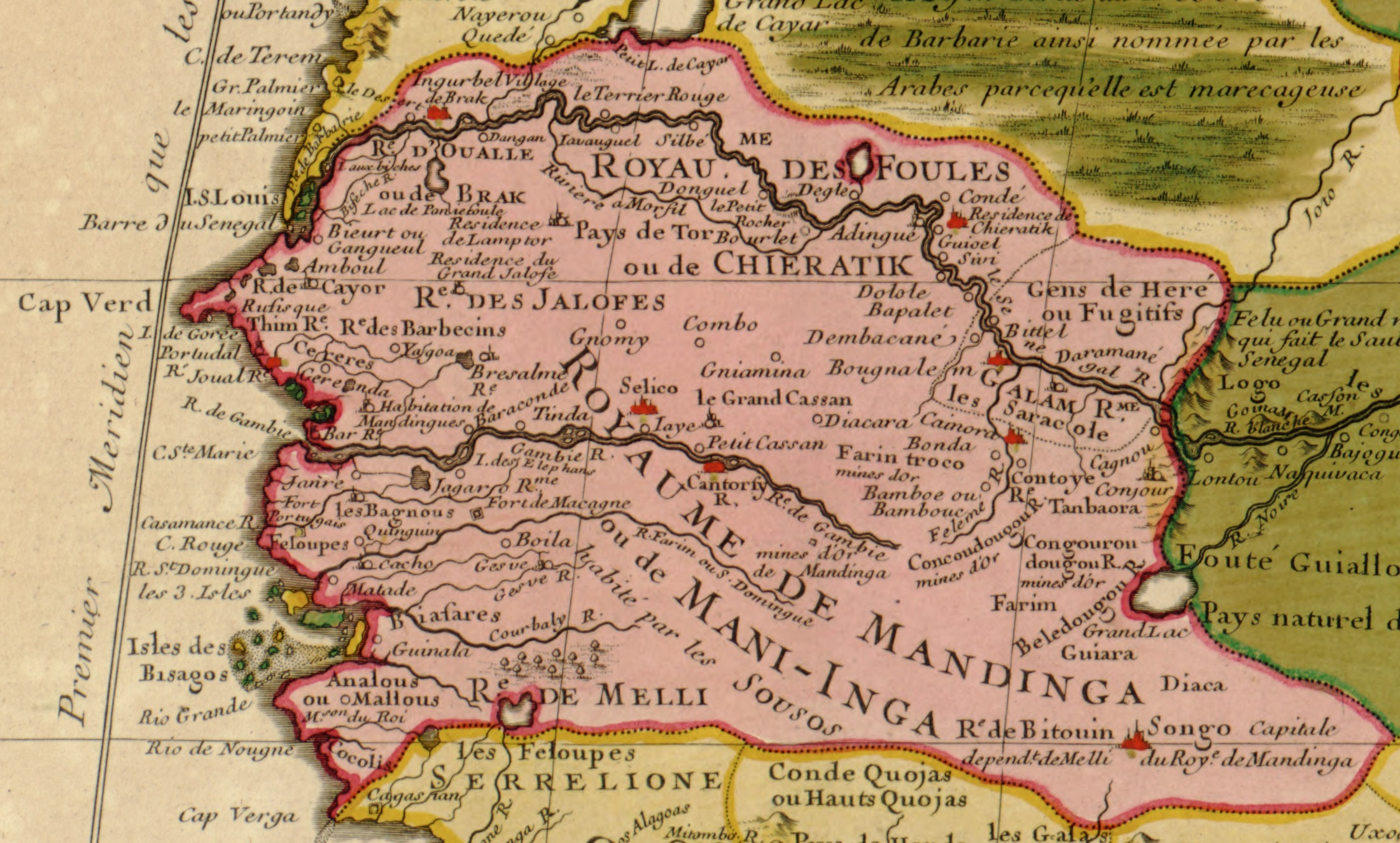
A map by Guillaume Delisle (1770)

The history of Senegal is commonly divided into a number of periods, encompassing the prehistoric era, the precolonial period, colonialism, and the contemporary era.

== Prehistory ==
In the case of Senegal, the periodization of prehistory remains controversial. It is often described as beginning with the age of metallurgy, thus placing it between the first metalworking and the appearance of writing. Other approaches exist such as that of Guy Thilmans and his team in 1980, who felt that any archeology from pre-colonial could be attached to that designation or that of Hamady Bocoum, who speaks of "Historical Archaeology" from the 4th century, at least for the former Tekrur.

=== Paleolithic ===
The earliest evidence of human life is found in the valley of the Falémé in the south-east.

The presence of man in the Lower Paleolithic is attested by the discovery of stone tools characteristic of Acheulean such as hand axes reported by Théodore Monod at the tip of Fann in the peninsula of Cap-Vert in 1938, or cleavers found in the south-east. There were also found stones shaped by the Levallois technique, characteristic of the Middle Paleolithic. Mousterian Industry is represented mainly by scrapers found in the peninsula of Cap-Vert, as well in the low and middle valleys of the Senegal and the Falémé. Some pieces are explicitly linked to hunting, like those found in Tiémassass, near M'Bour, a controversial site that some claim belongs to the Upper Paleolithic, while other argue in favor of the Neolithic.

=== Neolithic ===
In Senegambia, the period when humans became hunters, fishermen and producers (farmer and artisan) are all well represented and studied. This is when more elaborate objects and ceramics emerged. But gray areas remain. Although the characteristics and manifestations of civilization from the Neolithic have been identified their origins and relationship have not yet fully defined. What can be distinguished is:

- The dig of Cape Manuel: the Neolithic deposit Manueline Dakar was discovered in 1940. Basalt rocks including ankaramite were used for making microlithic tools such as axes or planes. Such tools have been found at Gorée and the Magdalen Islands, indicating the activity of shipbuilding by nearby fishermen.
- The dig of Bel-Air: Neolithic Bélarien tools, usually made out of flint, are present in the dunes of the west, near the current capital. In addition to axes, adzes and pottery, there is also a statuette, the Venus Thiaroye
- The dig of Khant: the Khanty creek, located in the north near Kayar in the lower valley of the Senegal River, gave its name to a Neolithic industry which mainly uses bone and wood. This deposit is on the list of closed sites and monuments of Senegal.
- The dig the Falémé located in the south-east of Senegal, has uncovered a Neolithic Falemian tools industry that produced polished materials as diverse as sandstone, hematite, shale, quartz, and flint. Grinding equipment and pottery from the period are well represented at the site.
- The Neolithic civilization of the Senegal River valley and the Ferlo are the least well known due to not always being separated.

=== Metal Age ===
A variety of archaeological remains have been found including tombs. The Serer people make a clear distinction between these tombs depending on who is buried in them, and call them "podom" (pre-Serer tombs, before the Serer of the north Exodus from Tekrur), or "lomb" or "pomboy" (Serer ancestral tombs post northern Serer Exodus from Tekrur). The Wolof refer to these tombs as "mbanaar." Archaeological remains found:

- On the coast and in river estuaries of the Senegal, Saloum, Gambia, and Casamance rivers, burial mounds with clusters of shells often referred to as middens. 217 of these clusters have been identified in the Saloum Delta alone, for example in Joal-Fadiouth, Mounds in the Saloum Delta have been dated back as far as 400 BCE, and part of the Saloum Delta is now a World Heritage Site. Funerary sites or tumuli were built there during the 8th to 16th centuries. They are also found in the north near Saint-Louis, and in the estuary of the Casamance.
- The West is rich in burial mounds of sand that the Wolof refer to as mbanaar, which translates to "graves", A solid gold pectoral of mass 191 g has also been discovered near Saint-Louis.

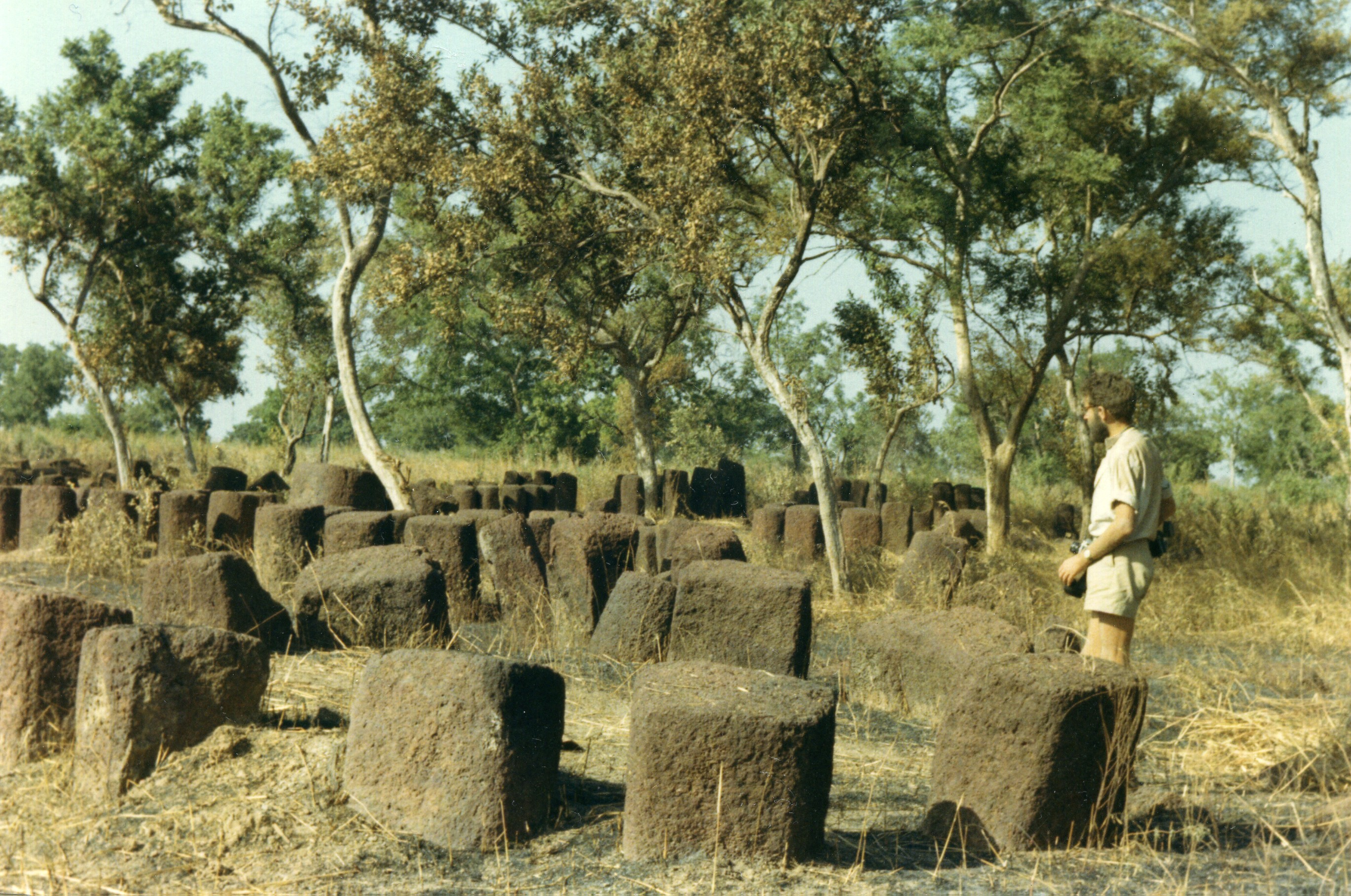
Megalithic alignments in Senegal

- In a huge area of nearly 33,000 km^{2} located in the center-south around the Gambia there have been found alignments of boulders known as the Stone Circles of Senegambia which were placed on the list of UNESCO World Heritage sites in 2006. Two of these sites are located within the territory of Senegal: Sine Ngayène and Sine Wanar, both located in the Nioro du Rip Department. Sine Ngayène has 52 stone circles including a double circle. At Wanar, they number 24 and the stones are smaller. There are stone-carved lyre in the laterite, Y- or A-shaped.
- The existence of proto-historic ruins in the middle Senegal River valley was confirmed in the late 1970s. Pottery, perforated ceramic discs or ornaments have been unearthed. Excavations at thé site of Sinthiou Bara, near Matam, have proved particularly fruitful. They have revealed, for example, the flow of trans-Saharan trade from distant parts of North Africa.

== Early historical inhabitants ==
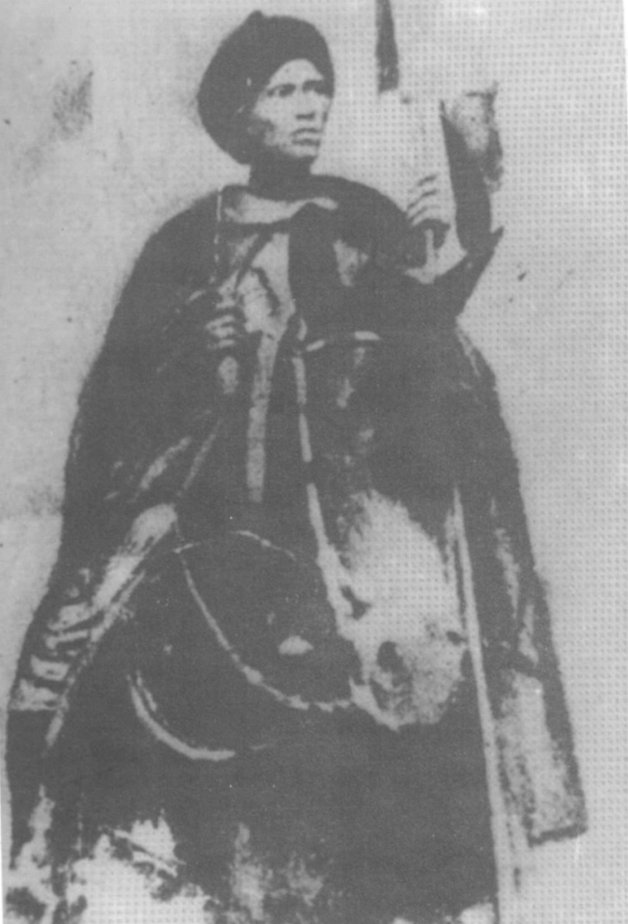
Maad a Sinig Kumba Ndoffene Fa Ndeb Joof. King of Sine. The Royal House of Boureh Gnilane Joof.

In the absence of written sources and monumental ruins in this region, the history of the early centuries of the modern era must be based primarily on archaeological excavations, the writing of early Arab geographers and travelers, and data derived from oral tradition. Combining these data suggests that Senegal was first populated from the north and east in several waves of migration, the last being that of the Wolof, the Fulani and the Serer who dominate the area today. Oral traditions relate that in much of northern Senegal Mande people were the earliest inhabitants, although archaeological evidence of this is slim. Other scholars believe that the Serer, along with the Jola and Papel people are one of the oldest inhabitants of the Senegambia region. Africanist historian Donald R. Wright has suggested that place-names in the Gambia and Casamance regions indicate "that the earliest inhabitants might be identified most closely with one of several related groups—Bainunk, Kasanga, Beafada... To these were added Serer, who moved southward during the first millennium A.D. from the Senegal River valley, and Mande-speaking peoples, who arrived later still from the east." He also cautions, however, that attempting to project modern-day ethnic definitions onto people who lived hundreds or thousands of years ago is at best highly speculative and at worst counterproductive.

== Kingdoms and empires ==
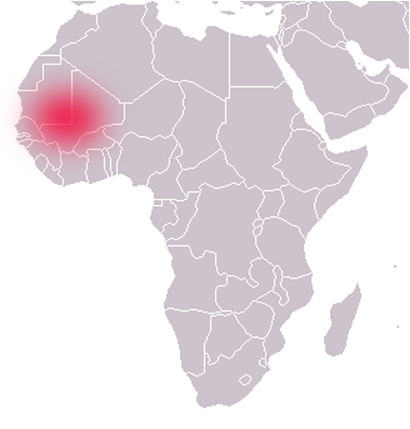
Location of the Ghana Empire

The medieval history of the Sahel is characterized by the consolidation of settlements into large state entities – the Ghana Empire, the Mali Empire and the Songhai Empire. The cores of these great empires were located on the territory of the current Republic of Mali, so current-day Senegal occupied a peripheral position.

The earliest of these empires is that of Ghana, probably founded in the first millennium by Soninke and whose animist populations subsisted by agriculture and trade across the Sahara, including gold, salt and cloth. Its area of influence slowly spread to regions between the river valleys of the Senegal and Niger.

A contemporary empire of Ghana, but less extensive, the kingdom of Tekrur was its vassal. Ghana and Tekrur were the only organized populations before Islamization. The territory of Tekrur approximates that of the current Fouta Toro. Its existence in the 9th century is attested by Arabic manuscripts. The formation of the state may have taken place as an influx of Fulani from the east settled in the Senegal valley. John Donnelly Fage suggests that Takrur was formed through the interaction of Berbers from the Sahara and "Negro agricultural peoples" who were "essentially Serer" although its kings after 1000 CE might have been Soninke (northern Mande). The name, borrowed from Arabic writings, may be linked to that of the ethnicity Toucouleur. Trade with the Arabs was prevalent. The Kingdom imported wool, copper and pearls and exported gold and slaves. Indeed, the growth of a vast empire by Arab-Muslim Jihads is not devoid of economic and political issues and brought in its wake the first real growth of the slave trade. This trade called the trans-Saharan slave trade provided North Africa and Saharan Africa with slave labor. The Tekrur were among the first converts to Islam, certainly before 1040.

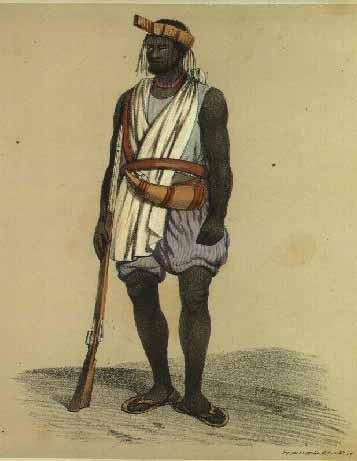
Wolof of Waalo, in "war costume" (1846)

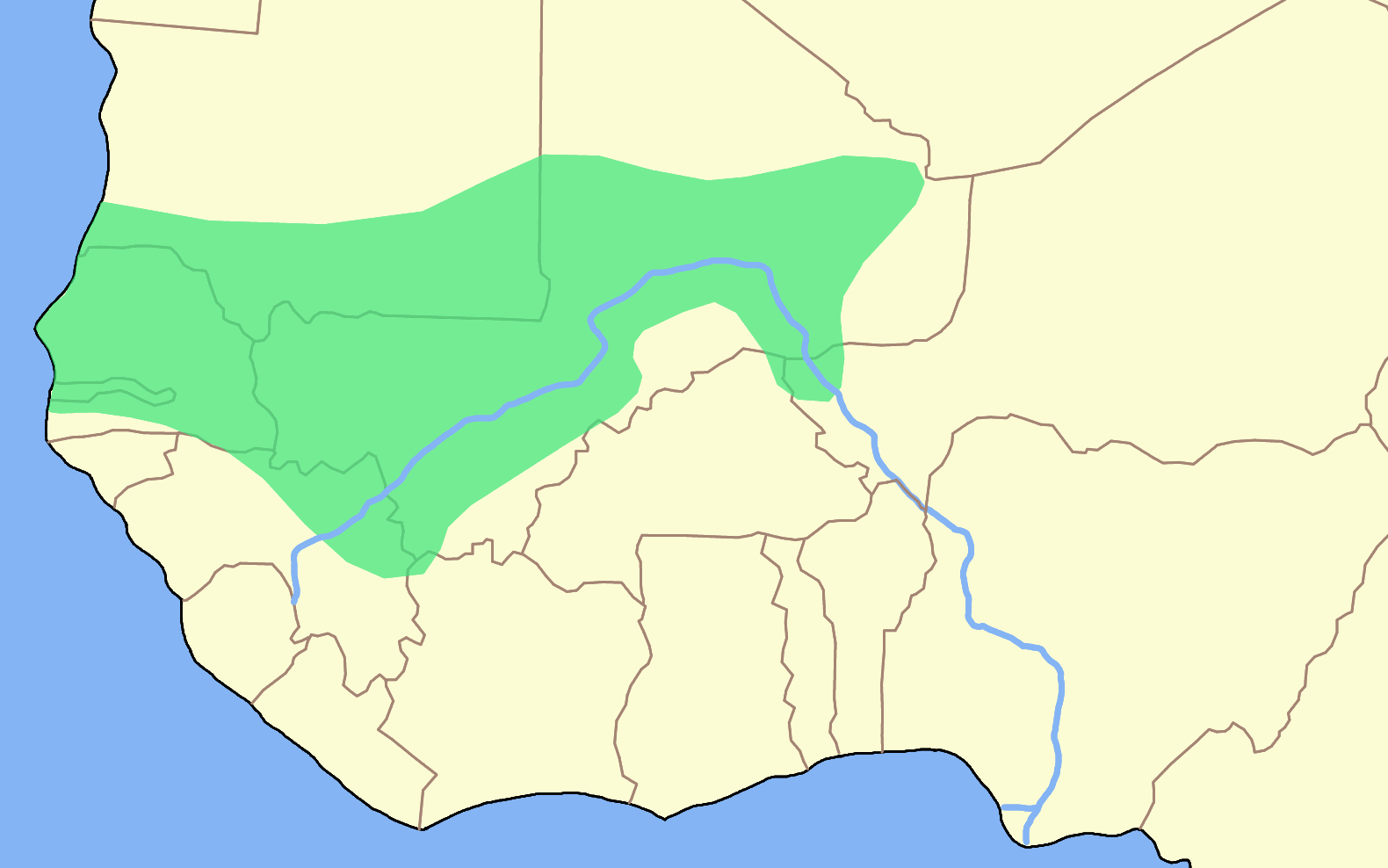
Extension of the Mali Empire at its height

Two other major political entities were formed and grew during the 13th and 14th century: the Mali Empire and the Jolof Empire which become the vassal of the first in its heyday. Originating in the Mandinka invasion, Mali continued to expand, encompassing first eastern Senegal, and later almost all the present territory. Founded in the 14th century by the possibly mythical chief of the Wolof Ndiadiane Ndiaye, who was a Serer of Waalo (Ndiaye is originally a Serer surname (Note: Both Ndiadiane's name and surname are Serer in origin. For the surname Njie or Ndiaye, from which Ndiadiane Ndiaye got his name, see Diop and Modum. The name comes from the Serer language.) (Note: Mam Kumba Njie (or Ndiaye) is a Serer Goddess in the Serer religion as well as the Almoravid invasion of Tekrur. See Henry Gravrand.) which is also found among the Wolof). Djolof expanded its dominance of small chiefdoms south of the Senegal River (Waalo, Cayor, Baol, Sine – Saloum), bringing together all the Senegambia to which he gave religious and social unity: the "Grand Djolof" which collapsed in 1550.

The Jolof Empire was founded by a voluntary confederacy of States; it was not an empire built on military conquest in spite of what the word "empire" implies. The Serer tradition of Sine attests that the Kingdom of Sine never paid tribute to Ndiadiane Ndiaye nor to any member of his descendants that ruled Djolof. Historian Sylviane Diouf states that "Each vassal kingdom—Walo, Takrur, Kayor, Baol, Sine, Salum, Wuli, and Niani—recognized the hegemony of Jolof and paid tribute." It went on to state that, Ndiadiane Ndiaye himself received his name from the mouth of Maissa Wali (the King of Sine). In the epics of Ndiadiane and Maissa Wali, it is well acknowledged that Maissa Wali was pivotal in the founding of this Empire. It was he who nominated Ndiadiane Ndiaye and called for the other states to join this confederacy, which they did, and the "empire" headed by Ndiadiane, who took residence at Djolof. It is for this reason scholars propose that the empire was more like a voluntary confederacy than an empire built on military conquest.

The arrival of Europeans engendered autonomy of small kingdoms which were under the influence of Djolof. Less dependent on trans-Saharan trade with the new shipping lanes, they turn more readily to trade with the New World. The decline of these kingdoms can be explained by internal rivalries, then by the arrival of Europeans, who organized the mass exodus of young Africans to the New World. Ghazis, wars, epidemics and famine afflicted the people, along with the Atlantic slave trade, in exchange for weapons and manufactured goods. Under the influence of Islam, these kingdoms were transformed and marabouts played an increasing role.

In Casamance, the Baïnounks, the Manjaques and Diola inhabited the coastal area while the mainland – unified 13th century under the name of Kaabu – was occupied by the Mandingo. In the 15th century, the king of one of the tribes, Kassas gave his name to the region: Kassa Mansa (King of Kassas). Until the French intervention The Casamance was a heterogeneous entity, weakened by internal rivalries.

== The era of trading posts and trafficking ==
According to several ancient sources, including occasions by the Dictionnaire de pédagogie et d'instruction primaire by Ferdinand Buisson in 1887, the first French settlement in Senegal dates back to the Dieppe Mariners in the 14th century. Flattering for Norman sailors, this argument gives credence also to the idea of a precedence of the French presence in the region, but it is not confirmed by subsequent work.

In the mid-15th century, several European nations reached the coast of West Africa, vested successively or simultaneously by the Portuguese, the Dutch, the English and French. Europeans first settled along the coasts, on islands in the mouths of rivers and then a little further upstream. They opened trading posts and engaged in the "trade:" – a term which, under the Ancien Régime, means any type of trade (wheat, pepper, ivory...), and not necessarily, or only, the slave trade, although this "infamous traffic", as it was called at the end of the 18th century, was indeed at the heart of a new economic order, controlled by powerful companies in privilege.

=== The Portuguese navigators ===
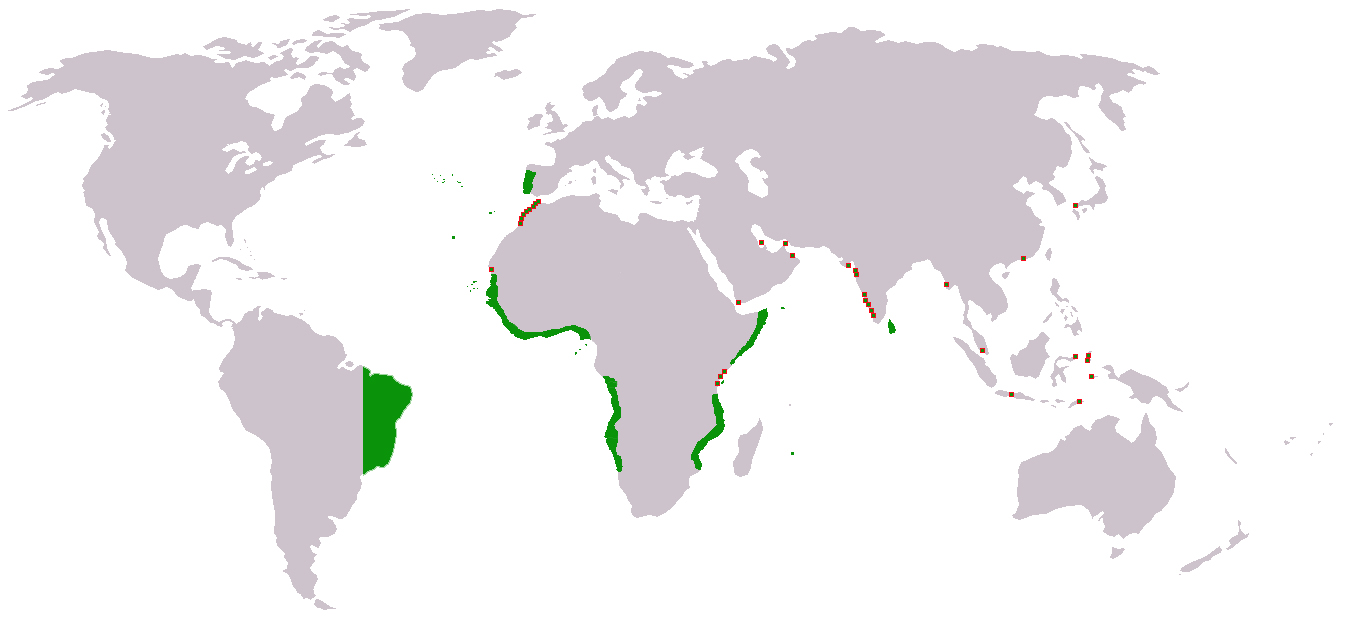
Portuguese colonies and posts under the reign of João III, 16th century

Encouraged by Henry the Navigator and always in search of the Passage to India, and not forgetting gold and slaves, Portuguese explorers explored the African coast and ventured still farther south.

In 1444 Dinis Dias went off the mouth of the Senegal River to reach the westernmost point of Africa he calls Cabo Verde, Cape Vert, (Note: This place corresponds to the area of Cap-Vert in the Senegal of today and not to Cape Verde (the îles du Cap-Vert), which was not discovered until 1456.) because of the lush vegetation seen there. He also reached the island of Gorée, referred to by its inhabitants as Berzeguiche, but which he called Ilha de Palma, the island of Palms. The Portuguese did not settle there permanently, but used the site for landing and engaged in commerce in the region. They built a chapel there in 1481. Portuguese trading posts were installed in Tanguegueth in Cayor, a town they renamed Fresco Rio (the future Rufisque) because of the freshness of its sources in the Baol Sali (later the seaside town of Saly) which takes the name of Portudal, or to Joal in the Kingdom of Sine.

They also traversed the lower Casamance and founded Ziguinchor in 1645. The introduction of Christianity accompanied this business expansion.

=== The Dutch West India Company ===
After the Act of Abjuration in 1581, the United Provinces flouted the authority of the King of Spain. They based their growth on maritime trade and expanded their colonial empire in Asia, the Americas and South Africa. In West Africa trading posts were opened at some points of the current Senegal, Gambia, Ghana and Angola.

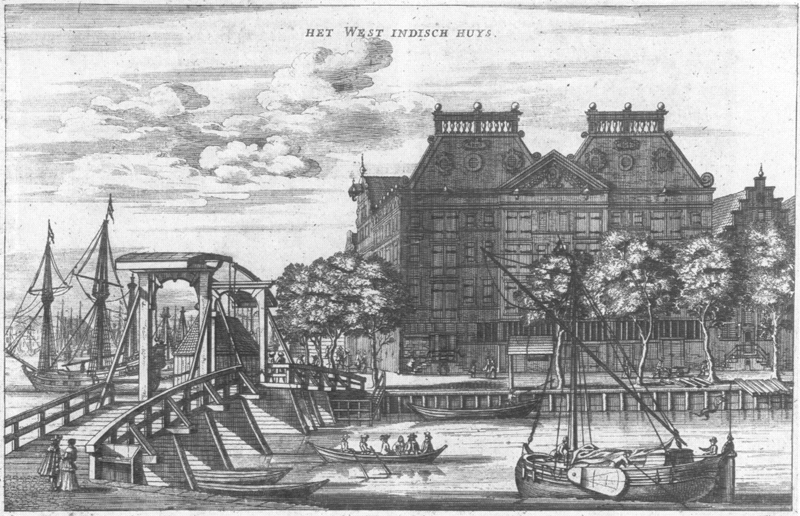
The Dutch West India Company at Amsterdam in 1655

Created in 1621, the Dutch West India Company purchased the island of Gorée in 1627. (Note: The date of 1617, cited by Olfert Dapper in Description de l'Afrique, is reprised in many sources. This date is implausible, given thé date of creation of the company; it is challenged by two historians of Gorée: Joseph Roger de Benoist and Abdoulaye Camara.) The company built two forts that are in ruins today: in 1628 on the face of Nassau Cove and 1639 at Nassau on the hill, as well as warehouses for goods destined for the mainland trading posts .

In his Description of Africa (1668), the humanist Dutch Olfert Dapper gives the etymology of the name given to it by his countrymen, Goe-ree Goede Reede, that is to say "good harbor", which is the name of (part of) an island in the Dutch province of Zeeland as well.

The Dutch settlers occupied the island for nearly half a century, dealing in wax, amber, gold, ivory and also participated in the slave trade, but kept away from foreign trading posts on the coast. The Dutch were dislodged several times: in 1629 by the Portuguese, in 1645 and 1659 by the French and in 1663 by the English.

=== Against the backdrop of Anglo-French rivalry ===
The "trade" and the slave trade intensified in the 17th century. In Senegal, the French and British competed mainly on two issues, the island of Gorée and St. Louis. On 10 February 1763 the Treaty of Paris ended the Seven Years' War and reconciled, after three years of negotiations, France, Great Britain and Spain. Great Britain returned the island of Gorée to France. Britain then acquired from France, among many other territories, "the river of Senegal, with forts & trading posts St. Louis, Podor, and Galam and all rights & dependencies of the said River of Senegal."

Under Louis XIII and especially Louis XIV, the privileges were quite extensively granted to certain French shipping lines, which still faced many difficulties. In 1626 Richelieu founded the Norman Company, an association of Dieppe and Rouen merchants responsible for the operation in Senegal and the Gambia. It was dissolved in 1658 and its assets were acquired by the Company of Cape Vert and Senegal, itself expropriated following the creation by Colbert in 1664 of the French West India Company.

The Company of Senegal was in turn founded by Colbert in 1673. It became the major tool of French colonialism in Senegal, but saddled with debt, it was dissolved 1681 and replaced by another that lasted until 1694, the date of creation of the Royal Company of Senegal, whose director, Andre Brue, would be captured by Lat Sukaabe Fall the Damel of Cayor and released against ransom in 1701. A third Company of Senegal was founded in 1709 and lasted until 1718. On the British side, the monopoly of trade with Africa was granted to the Royal African Company in 1698.

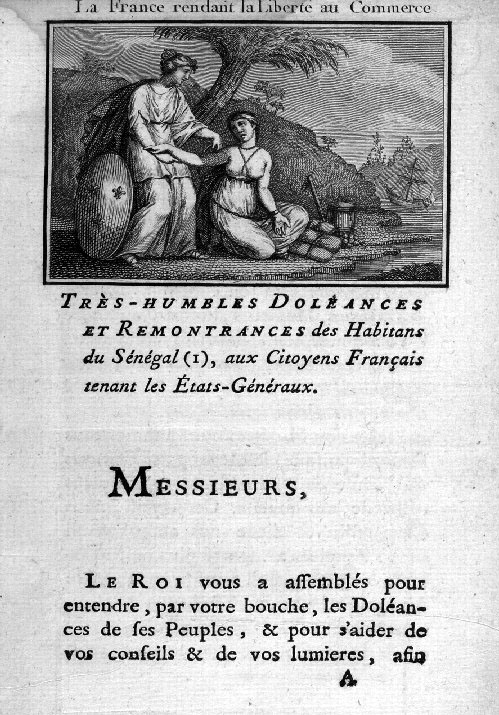
The List of Complaints of Saint-Louis du Sénégal (1789)

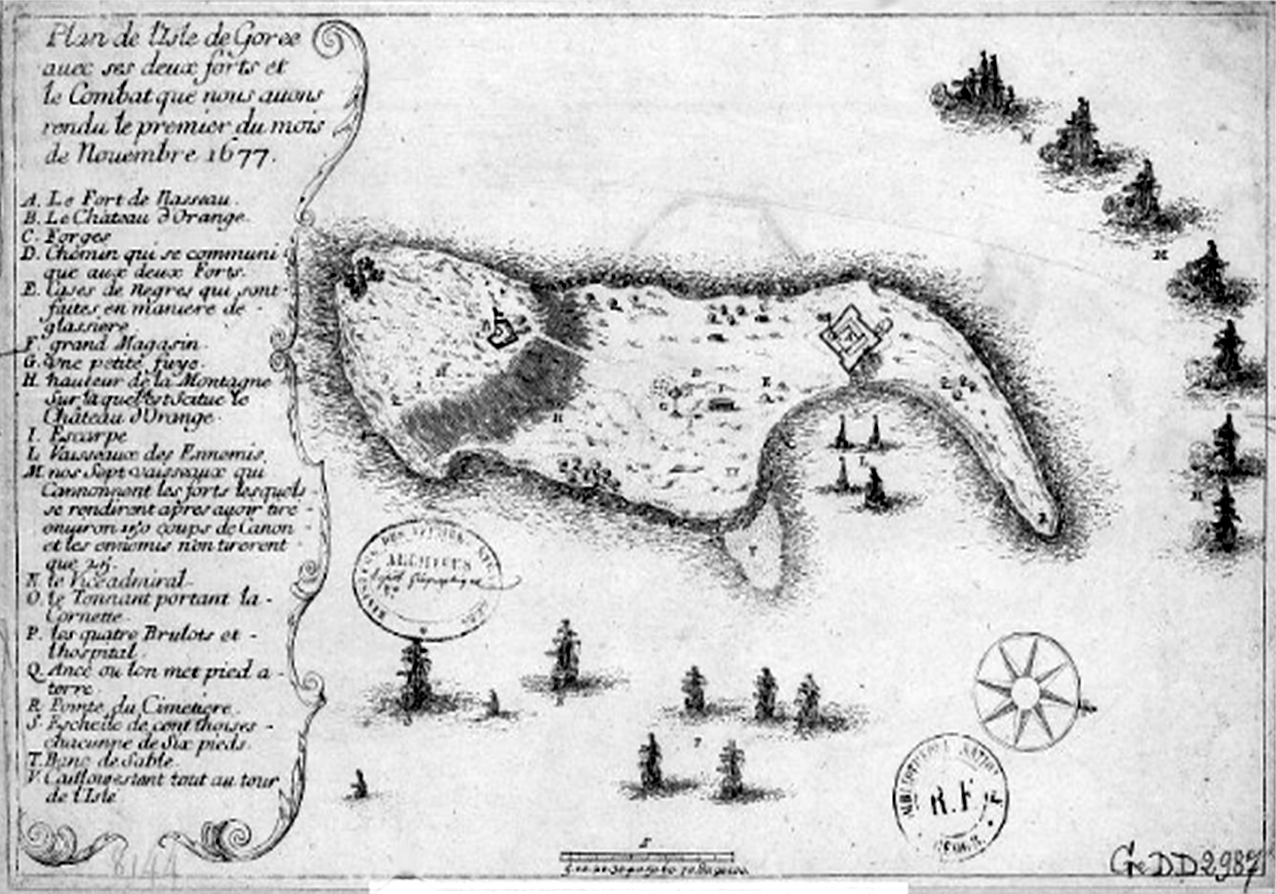
« Plan de l'isle de Gorée avec ses deux forts et le combat que nous avons rendu le premier du mois de novembre 1677 »

Grand Master of the naval war of Louis XIV, Admiral Jean II d'Estrées seized Gorée on 1 November 1677. The island was taken by the English on 4 February 1693 before being again occupied by the French four months later. In 1698 the Director of the Company of Senegal, Andre Brue, restored the fortifications. But capture of Gorée by the British occurred again in 1758 during the Seven Years' War. However, under the 1763 Treaty of Paris ending the war, although Senegal was given to the British, the island of Gorée was returned to France. (Note: "His Britannick Majesty shall restore to France the island of Goree in the condition it was in when conquered: and his Most Christian Majesty cedes, in full right, and guaranties to the King of Great Britain the river Senegal, with the forts and factories of St. Lewis, Podor, and Galam, and with all the rights and dependencies of the said river Senegal." – Article X of the Treaty of Paris (1763))

The excellent location of St. Louis caught the attention of the English, who occupied it three times, first for a few months in 1693, second during the Seven Years' War from 1758 until it was retaken for the French by Armand Louis de Gontaut in 1779, and lastly from 1809 to 1816 during the Napoleonic wars.

After the 1763 Treaty of Paris, the British united their colony of The Gambia with Senegal into Senegambia. The British retook Gorée during the Anglo-French War; however, British possession of Gorée was brief.

The 1783 Treaty of Versailles returned Senegal to France, (Note: Article IX of the 1783 Treaty of Versailles provided, "The King of Great Britain cedes, in full right, and guaranties to his Most Christian Majesty, the river Senegal and its dependencies, with the forts of St. Louis, Podor, Galam, Arguin, and Portendic; and his Britannik Majesty restores to France the island of Goree, which shall be delivered up in the condition it was in when the conquest of it was made.") and Senegambia was no more.

Nine companies, in succession, received the African monopoly of gum acacia from the French Crown. Seven of them went bankrupt. Among them were the Compagnie d'Afrique and the Compagnie du Sénégal. The last was the Compagnie de la Gomme which failed in 1793.

Appointed governor in 1785, Knight Boufflers focuses for two years to enhance the colony, while engaged in the smuggling of gum arabic and gold with signares.

In 1789 the people of St. Louis wrote a List of Grievances. The same year the French were driven out of Fort St. Joseph in Galam (Gajaaga) and the Kingdom of Galam.

=== A trading economy ===
The Europeans were sometimes disappointed because they hoped to find more gold in West Africa, but when the development of plantations in the Americas, mainly in the Caribbean, in Brazil and in the south of the United States raised a great need for cheap labor, the area received more attention. The Papacy, who had sometimes opposed slavery, did not condemn it explicitly to the end of the 17th century; in fact the Church itself has an interest in the colonial system. Traffic of "ebony" was an issue for warriors who traditionally reduced the vanquished to slavery. Some people specialized in the slave trade, for example the Dyula in West Africa. States and kingdoms competed, along with private traders who became much richer in the triangular trade (although some shipments resulted in real financial disaster). Politico-military instability in the region was compounded by the slave trade.

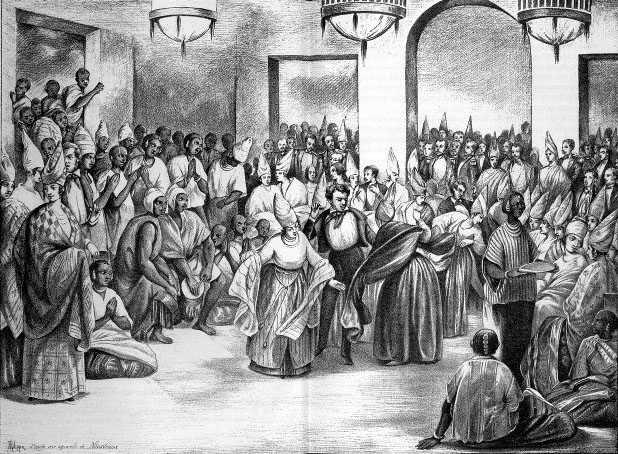
A ball signares in St. Louis (burning 1890)

The Black Code, enacted in 1685, regulated the trafficking of slaves in the American colonies.

In Senegal, trading posts were established in Gorée, St. Louis, Rufisque, Portudal and Joal and the upper valley of the Senegal River, including Fort St. Joseph, in the Kingdom of Galam, was in the 18th century a French engine of trafficking in Senegambia.

In parallel, a mestizo society develops in St. Louis and Gorée.

Slavery was abolished by the National Convention in 1794, then reinstated by Napoleon in 1802. The British Empire abolished slavery in 1833; in France it was finally abolished in the Second Republic in 1848, under the leadership of Victor Schœlcher.

=== The progressive weakening of the colony ===
In 1815, the Congress of Vienna condemned slavery. But this would not change much economically for the Africans.

After the departure of Governor Schmaltz (he had taken office at the end of the wreck of the Medusa), Jacques-François Roger Baron particularly encouraged the development of the peanut, "the earth pistachio", whose monoculture would be long because of the severe economic backwardness of Senegal. Despite the ferocity of the Baron, the company was a failure.

The colonization of Casamance also continued. The island of Carabane, acquired by France in 1836, was profoundly transformed between 1849 and 1857 by the resident Emmanuel Bertrand Bocandé, a Nantes businessman.

== Modern colonialism ==
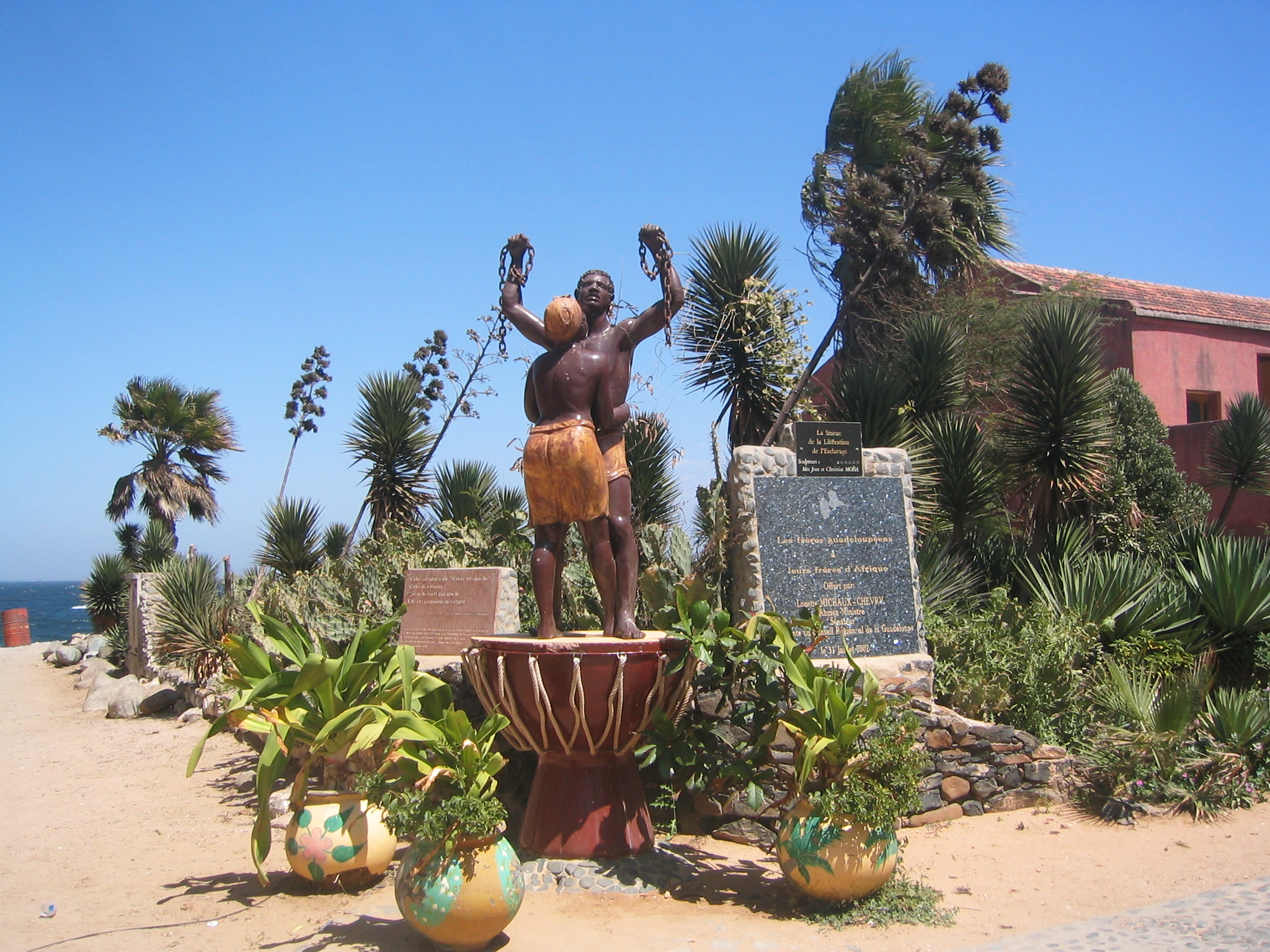
Monument near the Maison des Esclaves on Gorée Island

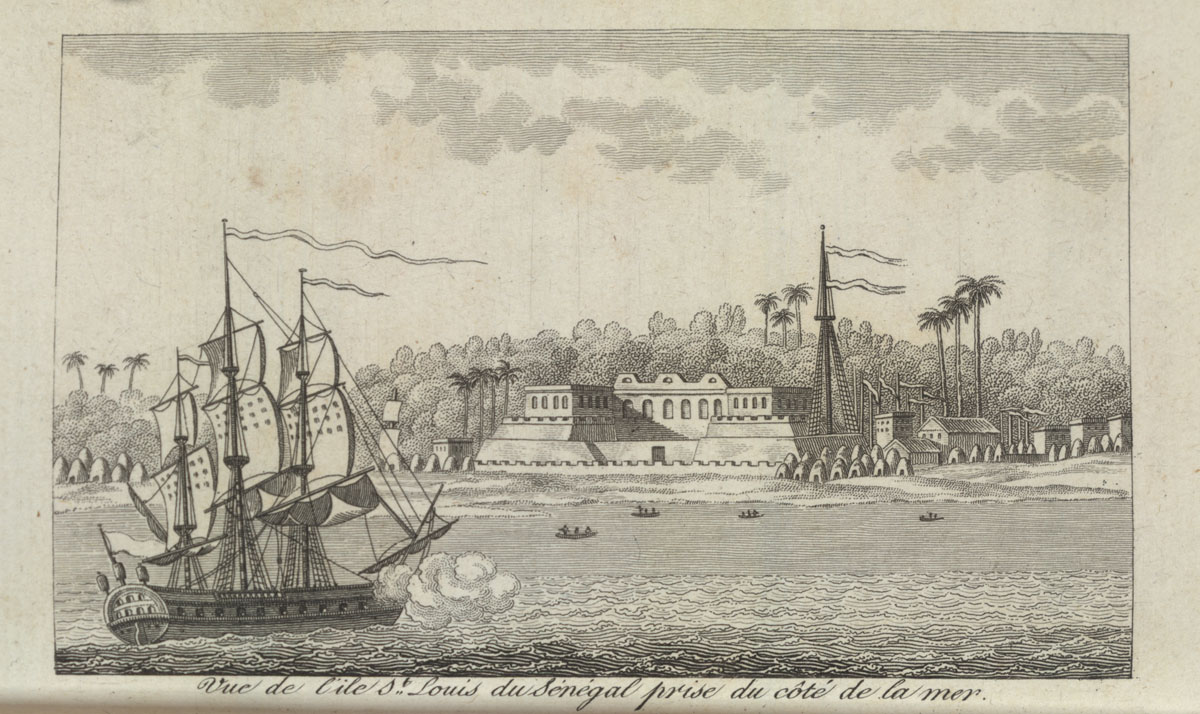
Saint-Louis in 1780

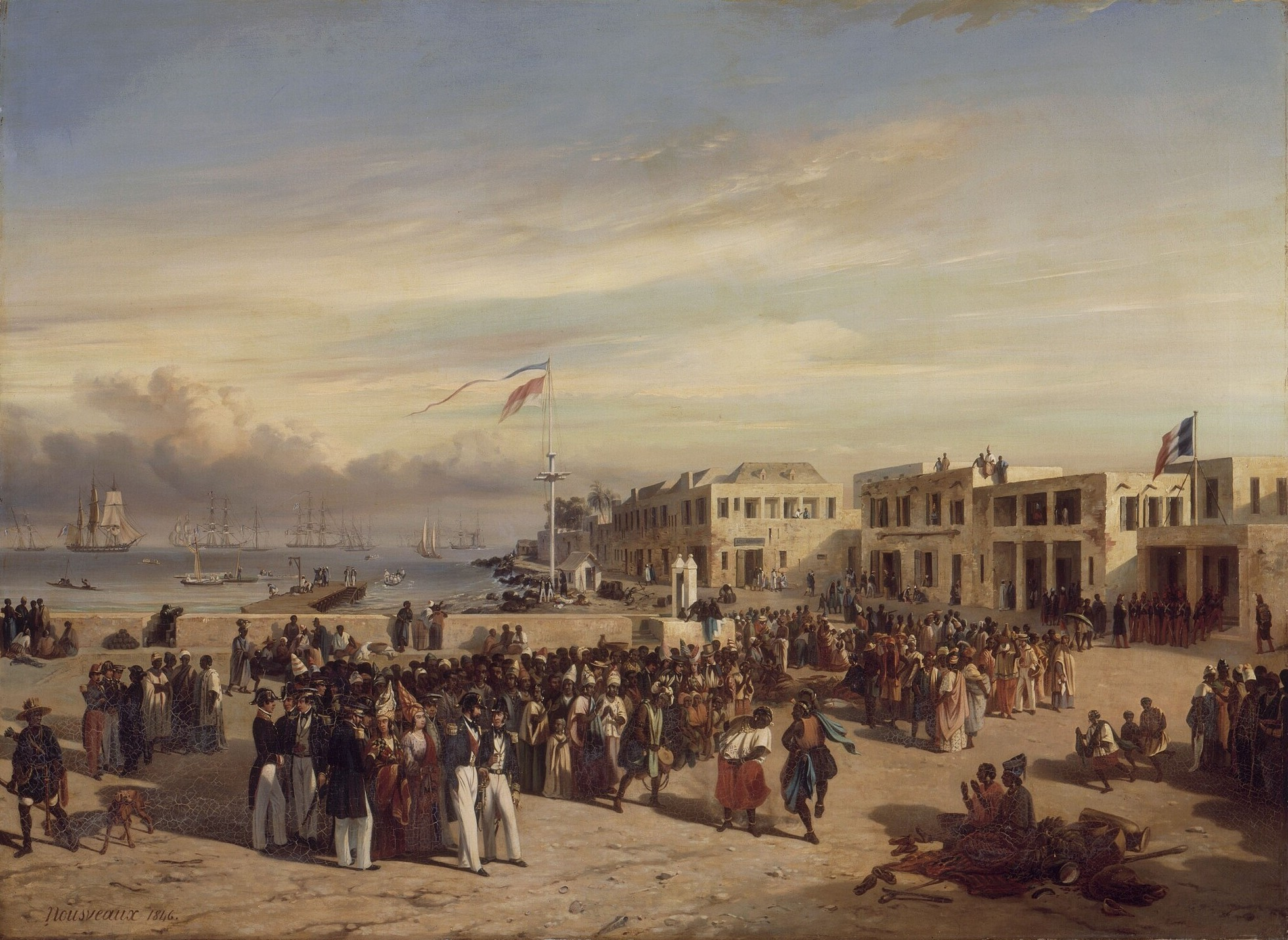
The Prince of Joinville arriving at Gorée in 1842

Various European powers – Portugal, the Netherlands, and England – competed for trade in the area from the 15th century onward, until in 1677, France ended up in possession of what had become a minor slave trade departure point—the infamous island of Gorée next to modern Dakar. In 1758 the French settlement was captured by a British expedition as part of the Seven Years' War, but was later returned to France. It was only in the 1850s that the French, under the governor, Louis Faidherbe, began to expand their foothold onto the Senegalese mainland, at the expense of the native kingdoms.

The Four Communes of Saint-Louis, Dakar, Gorée, and Rufisque were the oldest colonial towns in French controlled west Africa. In 1848, the French Second Republic extended the rights of full French citizenship to their inhabitants. While those who were born in these towns could technically enjoy all the rights of native French citizens, substantial legal and social barriers prevented the full exercise of these rights, especially by those seen by authorities as full blooded Africans.

Most of the African population of these towns were termed originaires: those Africans born into the commune, but who retained recourse to African and/or Islamic law (the so-called "personal status"). Those few Africans from the four communes who were able to pursue higher education and were willing to renounce their legal protections could "rise" to be termed Évolué ("Evolved") and were nominally granted full French citizenship, including the vote. Despite this legal framework, Évolués still faced substantial discrimination in Africa and the Metropole alike.

On 27 April 1848, following the February revolution in France, a law was passed in Paris enabling the Four Communes to elect a Deputy to the French Parliament for the first time. On 2 April 1852 the parliamentary seat for Senegal was abolished by Napoleon III. Following the downfall of the French Second Empire, the Four Communes was again allowed a parliamentary seat which was granted by law on 1 February 1871. On 30 December 1875 this seat was again abolished, but only for a few years as it was reinstated on 8 April 1879, and remained the single parliamentary representation from sub-Saharan Africa anywhere in a European legislature until the fall of the third republic in 1940.

It was only in 1916 that originaires were granted full voting rights while maintaining legal protections. Blaise Diagne, who was the prime advocate behind the change, was in 1914 the first African deputy elected to the French National Assembly. From that time until independence in 1960, the deputies of the Four Communes were always African, and were at the forefront of the decolonisation struggle.

=== List of deputies elected to the French Parliament ===
The French Second Republic:

- Barthélémy Durand Valantin 1848–1850 (Mixed race)
- Vacant 1850–1852
- Abolished 1852–1871

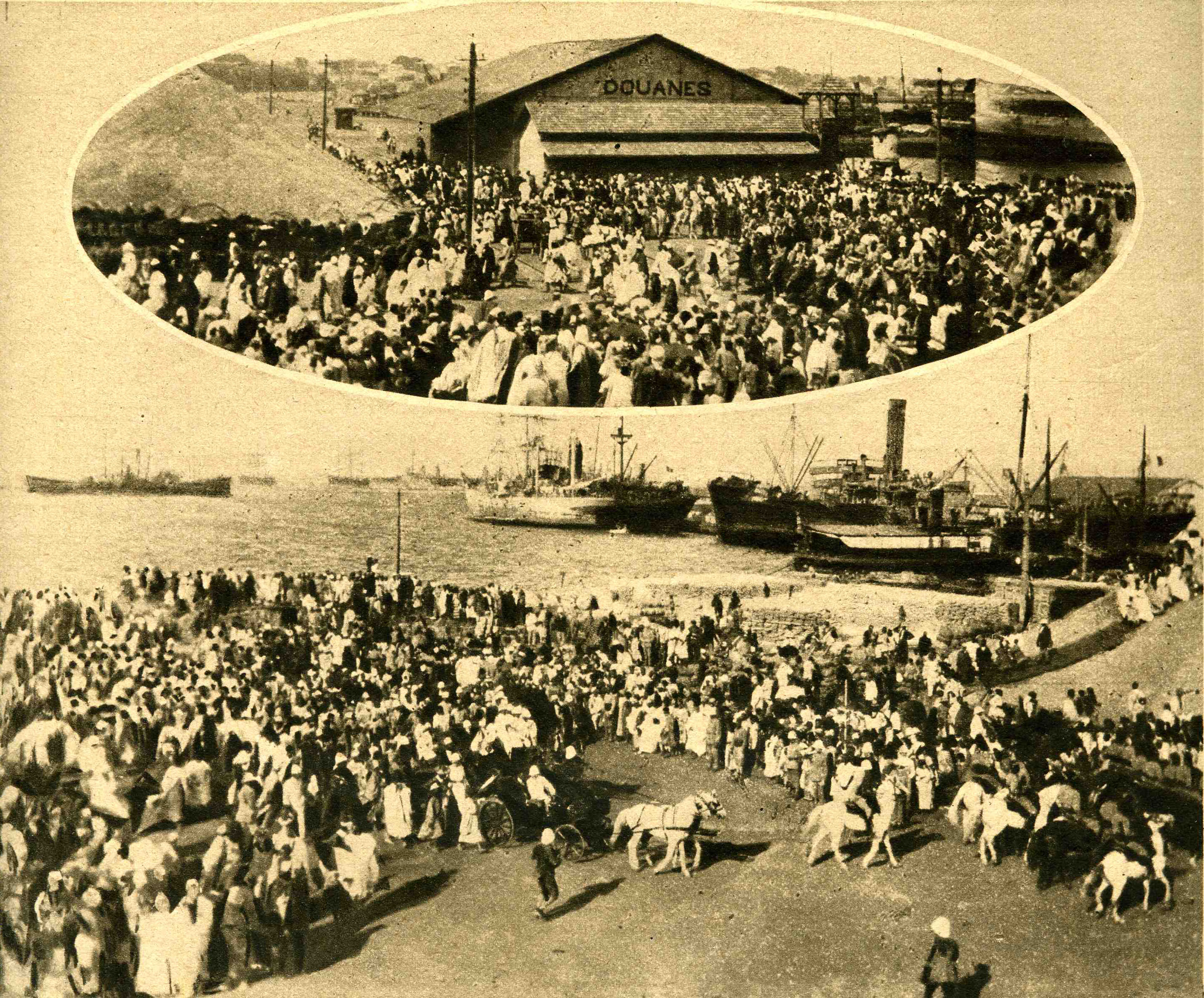
Arrival of Blaise Diagne, Deputy for Senegal, High Commissioner of the Government for the recruitment of black troops in Dakar in March 1918

The French Third Republic:

- Jean-Baptiste Lafon de Fongauffier 1871–1876 (Mixed race)
- Abolished 1876–1879
- Alfred Gasconi 1879–1889 (Mixed race)
- Aristide Vallon 1889–1893
- Jules Couchard 1893–1898
- Hector D'Agoult 1898–1902
- François Carpot 1902–1914 (Mixed race)
- Blaise Diagne 1914–1934 (African)
- Galandou Diouf 1934–1940 (African)

Flag of French Senegal (1958–1959)

1945–1959:

- Amadou Lamine Guèye 1945–1951 (African)
- Léopold Sedar Senghor 1945–1959 (African)
- Abbas Guèye 1951–1955 (African)
- Mamadou Dia 1956–1959 (African)

Following the 1945 elections to the Constituent Assembly in France, which were held with a very limited franchise, the French authorities gradually extended the franchise until—in November 1955—the principle of universal suffrage was passed into law and implemented the following year. The first electoral contests held under universal suffrage were the municipal elections of November 1956. The first national contest was the 31 March 1957 election of the Territorial Assembly.

== Independence ==
The short-lived Mali Federation

In 1959, Senegal and the French Sudan merged to form the Mali Federation, which became fully independent in 1960. The transfer of power agreement with France was signed on 4 April 1960, commemorated as the Senegalese Independence Day. Initially, the Mali Federation expressed its desire to continue cooperating with France. However, the Senegalese quickly expressed their desire to leave the Federation, which led to the dissolution of this political entity on 20 August 1960, and the adoption by the National Assembly on 25 August 1960, of a new constitution similar to that of the Fifth French Republic, creating a mixed parliamentary-presidential system for Senegal. Two independent states, Senegal itself and Soudan (renamed the Republic of Mali), were born out of this split.. The Republic of Senegal was formally proclaimed on 5 September 1960, with Léopold Sédar Senghor as President (head of state)—internationally known poet, politician, and statesman—and Mamadou Dia as Prime Minister (president of the 15-member Council of Ministers).

The 1960s and early 1970s saw the continued and persistent violating of Senegal's borders by the Portuguese military from Portuguese Guinea. In response, Senegal petitioned the United Nations Security Council in 1963, 1965, 1969 (in response to shelling by Portuguese artillery), 1971 and finally in 1972.

After the breakup of the Mali Federation, President Senghor and Prime Minister Mamadou Dia governed together under a parliamentary system. In December 1962, their political rivalry led to an attempted coup by Prime Minister Dia. The coup was put down without bloodshed and Dia was arrested and imprisoned. Senegal adopted a new constitution that consolidated the President's power.

Senghor was considerably more tolerant of opposition than most African leaders became in the 1960s. Nonetheless, political activity was somewhat restricted for a time. Senghor's party, the Senegalese Progressive Union (now the Socialist Party of Senegal), was the only legally permitted party from 1965 until 1975. In the latter year, Senghor allowed the formation of two opposition parties that began operation in 1976—a Marxist party (the African Independence Party) and a liberal party (the Senegalese Democratic Party).

On 31 December 1980, President Senghor retired from politics, and handed power over to his handpicked successor, Prime Minister Abdou Diouf, 1 January 1981.

== 1980–present ==
Senegal joined with The Gambia to form the nominal confederation of Sénégambia on 1 February 1982. However, the envisaged integration of the two countries was never carried out and the union was dissolved in 1989. Despite peace talks, a southern separatist group in the Casamance region has clashed sporadically with government forces since 1982. Senegal has a long history of participating in international peacekeeping.

Abdou Diouf was president between 1981 and 2000. Diouf served four terms as president. In the presidential election of 2000, he was defeated in a free and fair election by opposition leader Abdoulaye Wade. Senegal experienced its second peaceful transition of power and its first from one political party to another.

On 30 December 2004, President Abdoulaye Wade announced that he would sign a peace treaty with two separatist factions of the Movement of Democratic Forces of Casamance (MFDC) in the Casamance region. This will end West Africa's longest-running civil conflict. As of late 2006, it seemed the peace treaty was holding, as both factions and the Senegalese military appeared to honor the treaty. With recognized prospects for peace, refugees began returning home from neighboring Guinea-Bissau. However, at the beginning of 2007, refugees began fleeing again as the sight of Senegalese troops rekindled fears of a new outbreak of violence between the separatists and the government.

Abdoulaye Wade conceded defeat to Macky Sall in the election of 2012. In February 2019, president Macky Sall was re-elected and he won a second term. The length of presidential term was reduced from seven years to five.

In March 2024, Opposition candidate Bassirou Diomaye Faye won the Senegal’s presidential election over the candidate of the ruling coalition, becoming the youngest president in Senegal’s history. In December 2024, President Bassirou Diomaye Faye announced that France should shut down its military bases in Senegal. The status of the end of the presence of French forces in Senegal is planned for September 2025.

On 1 July 2025, France handed over the Rufisque joint station to Senegal. This station, active since 1960, was responsible for communications on the southern Atlantic coast. It also served as a listening station in the fight against maritime trafficking. The handover was carried out without ceremony, limited to the signing of a report. The handover of the last remaining military infrastructure in Senegal to the Senegalese authorities is planned. On 18 July 2025, the two military sites will be returned to the Senegalese government: the airport base and Camp Geille, a 5-hectare site located in Ouakam. Four villas located in Plateau, near the port, will also be transferred to the Senegalese authorities.

== See also ==
- Dakar history and timeline
- Four Communes
- French Colony of Senegal, 1817–1946
- History of Africa
- History of West Africa
- Politics of Senegal
- List of colonial governors of Senegal
- President of Senegal
- Prime Minister of Senegal
- Saint-Louis history and timeline
- Timeline of Senegal
