= Blaise Diagne =

Senegalese and French politician (1872–1934)

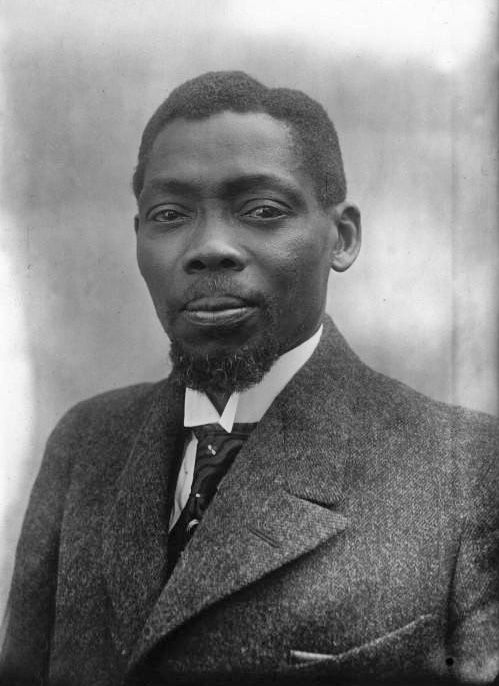
- Diagne in 1921

Member of the Chamber of Deputies
- In office 10 May 1914 – 11 May 1934
- Preceded by: François Carpot
- Succeeded by: Ngalandou Diouf
- Constituency: Four Communes

Personal details
- Born: 13 October 1872 Gorée, French Senegal, France
- Died: 11 May 1934 (aged 61) Cambo-les-Bains, France
- Party: French Section of the Workers' International; Independent
- Children: Raoul

Blaise Diagne (French pronunciation: [blɛz djaɲ]; 13 October 1872 – 11 May 1934) was a French Senegalese politician who was a member of the Chamber of Deputies from 1914 to 1934, representing the Four Communes of French Senegal. He was the first person of full West African descent to be elected to the Chamber of Deputies and the first to hold a position in the French government.

== Background ==
Born in Gorée to a Senegalese Lebu father—Niokhor Diagne—a cook and sailor, and a Manjack mother of Guinea-Bissau origin—Gnagna Anthony Preira. Diagne was adopted as a child by the Crespin family who were of mixed race origin from Gorée and Saint-Louis, and Christians. They baptised him as "Blaise". He studied in France before joining the French customs service in 1892. He served in Dahomey (modern day Benin), French Congo (now Republic of the Congo), Réunion, Madagascar, and French Guiana. In September 1899, while in Réunion, Diagne became a freemason, joining a lodge affiliated with the Grand Orient de France.

== Political career ==
Diagne was elected to the Chamber of Deputies of France on 10 May 1914 as the representative for the Four Communes. When he took office, he was the first person of full African descent to be elected, though he had been preceded by two mixed-race deputies (Note: Barthélémy Durand Valantin from 1848 to 1850 and François Carpot from 1902 to 1914.) During World War I, Diagne helped the French to conscript Senegalese citizens into the regular French Army. The Four Communes were subsequently ensured citizenship status in France.

He was reelected several times, serving until his death in 1934. From 1914 to 1917 he caucused with the Marxist-socialist French Section of the Workers' International, forerunner of the French Socialist Party, before affiliating with the Independents led by Georges Mandel. In 1914 after recently becoming the newly elected deputy of Senegal, Blaise Diagne was critical in the government intervention in an outbreak of plague which struck Dakar.

In 1916 Diagne convinced the French parliament to approve a law (Loi "Blaise Diagne") granting full citizenship to all residents of the so-called Four Communes in Senegal: Dakar, Gorée, Saint-Louis, and Rufisque. This extension of citizenship occurred during World War I when the French needed to recruit its African population into the military. As part of Diagne's deal with the French to grant citizenship, he helped them organize military recruitment in Senegal.

This measure constituted a considerable element of the French colonial policy of a "civilizing mission" (mission civilisatrice). He was a leading recruiter for the French army during World War I, when thousands of black West Africans fought on the Western Front for France.

After the war, Diagne embarked on an administrative career in addition to his responsibilities as a parliamentary deputy. From October 1918 to January 1920 he served as Commissioner General of the Ministry of the Colonies with supervision of military personnel from the colonies and workers from France's African possessions. He represented France in the International Labor Office, the secretariat of the International Labour Organization, in 1930. From January 1931 to February 1932 he was Under-Secretary of State for the Colonies, a junior level cabinet position. From 1920 to 1934 he served as mayor of Dakar.

He died in Cambo-les-Bains in 1934.

== Legacy ==
He was a pioneer of African electoral politics and an advocate of equal rights for all, regardless of race. He encouraged African accommodation of French rule and the adoption of French cultural and social norms. Though he was ahead of his time in 1914, by the later years of his life, African colonial politics had passed him by. He continued to advocate an African role in France while most Western-educated African elites embraced African nationalism and worked for eventual independence from the colonial powers. African-American historian and Pan-Africanist W. E. B. Du Bois faulted him harshly for a perceived lack of commitment to African interests "...Diagne is a Frenchman who is accidentally black. I suspect Diagne rather despises his own black Wolofs."

It is alleged that he was not buried in the Muslim cemetery of Soumbedioune in Dakar because of his freemasonry. However, a large boulevard (Avenue Blaise Diagne) and a high school (Lycée Blaise Diagne) in Dakar were named in his honor, as well as Senegal's new international airport, Blaise Diagne International Airport in Ndiass, 52 kilometers (32 mi) outside of Dakar.

His son Raoul was the first black man to play professional football in France and had great success playing for Racing Club de France in the late 1930s, winning the French title in 1936 and the French cup in 1936, 1939, and 1940.

His like-named grandson was born in Paris in 1954 to his son Adolphe (1907–1985, a French medical officer). The younger Blaise became mayor of the French village of Lourmarin in the Lubéron mountains of Provence in 2001 and was reelected in 2008. According to him the memory of his grandfather was scarcely mentioned within the family, "but my parents have always been very discreet about this family history" (French: Mais mes parents ont toujours été très discrets sur cette histoire familiale). His mother and grandmother were both French "white" women. When interviewed in 2005, the younger Blaise said he had not traveled to Senegal since 1960 and thought he "has nothing to bring there".

== See also ==
- List of mayors of Dakar
- Timeline of Dakar

== References and sources ==
Sources

- Echenberg, J. Myron (2002). Black Death, White Medicine: Bubonic plague and the Politics of Public Health in Colonial Senegal. Portsmouth, NH: Heinemann. ISBN 0325070172.
- Johnson, G. Wesley (1971). The Emergence of Black Politics in Senegal: The Struggle for Power in the Four Communes, 1900–1920. Stanford, CA: Stanford University Press. ISBN 0804707839.
