= Ngalandou Diouf =

French and Senegalese politician (1875–1941)

Member of the Chamber of Deputies
- In office 29 July 1934 – 6 August 1941 (Note: Diouf fled France in 1940, during the Battle of France, and was unable to vote. Despite this, he did not resign from the Chamber of Deputies and continued to legally serve.)
- Preceded by: Blaise Diagne
- Succeeded by: Position abolished (1940–1945); Amadou Lamine-Guèye and Léopold Sédar Senghor (1945)
- Constituency: Four Communes

Personal details
- Born: 14 September 1875 Saint-Louis, French Senegal, France
- Died: 6 August 1941 (aged 65) Cannes, France
- Party: Independent Left; Radical-Socialist Party Camille Pelletan

Ngalandou Diouf (also Galandou Diouf; 14 September 1875 – 6 August 1941) was a French and Senegalese politician who was a member of the French Chamber of Deputies representing the Four Communes from 1934 until his death in 1941. He was the last person to represent the Four Communes under the French Third Republic.

== Early life ==
Diouf was born to the aristocratic Diouf family. He was of Wolof and Serer background, and as a native of one of the Four Communes of Senegal considered part of France, was granted the (nominally) full rights of French citizenship. He began his career as a schoolteacher and minor government clerk but became progressively involved in politics.

== Political career ==
Diouf was elected in 1909 to represent the commune of Rufisque at the advisory General Assembly (Conseil Général) of Saint-Louis, then capital of colonial Senegal. He was an editor of the influential La Démocratie newspaper, and founding editor of "Le Sénégal". As a journalist and political leader, he was the political godfather of Blaise Diagne, whose fame and political success quickly supplanted Diouf's own. Diouf and Diagne finally broke in 1928 over Diouf's view that Diagne had conceded too much to French interests, and over Diouf's increasingly anti-communist and anti-socialist views.

After Diagne's death, Diouf was elected to his seat in the Chamber of Deputies, leading a coalition of the centre-left, small farmers, Senegalese veterans of the French military, and followers of the Tijaniyyah Sufi brotherhood which defeated the socialist and Mouride brotherhood coalition of Amadou Lamine-Guèye, an attorney who would later carry out much of Diagne's political program.

== In the Chamber of Deputies ==
In the Assembly, Diouf joined with the Independent Left, connected to the Radical-Socialist Party Camille Pelletan. Diouf fled France during the Battle of France and was not present to vote against the French Constitutional Law of 1940, which gave power to Philippe Pétain and Vichy France. Diouf had opposed the armistice with the Germans, even drafting an appeal on 19 June 1940 with the Guadeloupean deputies Gratien Candace and Maurice Satineau to President Albert François Lebrun that called on the government to continue the war in the colonies.

Diouf was among the Massilia Deputies, a group of 27 deputies also including Édouard Daladier, Georges Mandel, Jean Zay, and Pierre Mendès-France. The group boarded the SS Massilia and fled to Casablanca in French Morocco, where they planned to set up a government-in-exile. After disembarking at Port-Vendres, the group, including Diouf, were arrested by collaborationist officials, but Diouf was not deported to face trial with the leadership.

== Later life ==
Ngalandou Diouf died in 1941. A large secondary school in Dakar and major streets in both Dakar and Saint-Louis are named for him.
