= 1879 Senegal by-election =

A by-election for the French National Assembly was held in Senegal in 1879. Although Maréchal received over 50% of the vote in the first round, he did not reach the quorum of 25% of registered voters. Alfred Gasconi, the Republican candidate, was elected in the second round of voting.

== Background ==
The single Senegalese seat in the National Assembly had been abolished by a decree of 2 February 1852. Although it was restored in 1871, a new electoral law was passed in 1875 that did not mention Senegal, meaning no MP was elected in 1876 or 1877. However, a decree of 1879 reinstated the seat.

== Electoral system ==
The election was held using the two-round system, with a candidate required to get over 50% of the vote and a number of votes equivalent to 25% of the registered voters to win in the first round.

== Results ==
Candidate	First round		Second round	
Candidate	Votes	%	Votes	%
Maréchal	1,158	49.96	1,134	47.17
Alfred Gasconi	925	39.91	1,159	48.21
Crespin	232	10.01	111	4.62
Others	3	0.13		
Total	2,318	100.00	2,404	100.00
Valid votes	2,318	99.96		
Invalid/blank votes	1	0.04		
Total votes	2,319	100.00		
Registered voters/turnout	6,419	36.13	6,419	–
Source: Official Journal

== See also ==
- Four Communes
