= 1848 French legislative election in Senegal =

Elections to the French National Assembly were held in Senegal between 30 October and 2 November 1848.

== Electoral system ==
The single Senegalese seat in the National Assembly was created by decree on 5 March 1848. Following an order of 5 November 1830 and a law of 24 April 1833, all free-born people and freed slaves in the Four Communes in Senegal had full civic and political rights, the only French African colony to give such rights until the end of World War II. The right to vote was given to all men over the age of 25 and who could prove they had lived in their municipality for the previous five years. In total 4,726 men registered to vote.

== Campaign ==
The election was contested by four candidates; former Governor Léandre Bertin du Château, the creole Barthélémy Durand Valantin, Victor Schœlcher, a well-known anti-slavery activist and De Giradin. Although Schœlcher was on the ballot, he was not in Senegal at the time.

== Results ==
Candidate	Votes	%
Barthélémy Durand Valantin	1,080	52.15
Léandre Bertin du Château	697	33.66
Victor Schœlcher	261	12.60
De Giradin	33	1.59
Total	2,071	100.00
Total votes	2,071	–
Registered voters/turnout	4,726	43.82
Source: Bulletin de L'Institut Fondamental D'Afrique Noire
