= Four Communes =

French colonial towns in Senegal with elevated rights

The Four Communes (French: Quatre Communes) of Senegal were the four oldest colonial towns in French West Africa. In 1848 the Second Republic extended the rights of full French citizenship to the inhabitants of Saint-Louis, Dakar, Gorée, and Rufisque. While those who were born in these towns could technically enjoy all the rights of native French citizens, substantial legal and social barriers prevented the full exercise of these rights, especially by those seen by authorities as "full-blooded" Africans. Most of the African population of these towns were termed originaires: those Africans born into the commune, but who retained recourse to African and/or Islamic law (the so-called "personal status"). Those few Africans from the four communes who were able to pursue higher education and were willing to renounce their legal protections could "rise" to become termed Évolués (Evolved) and were nominally granted full French citizenship. Despite this legal framework, Évolués still faced substantial discrimination in Africa and the Metropole alike.

On 27 April 1848, following the February revolution in France, a law was passed in Paris enabling the Four Communes to elect a deputy to the French Parliament for the first time, with the first election held between 30 October and 2 November that year. On 2 April 1852 Napoleon III abolished the parliamentary seat for Senegal. Following the downfall of the French Second Empire the Four Communes were again allowed a parliamentary seat which was granted by law on 1 February 1871. On 30 December 1875 this seat was again abolished, but only for a few years as it was reinstated on 8 April 1879, and remained the single parliamentary representation from sub-Saharan Africa anywhere in a European legislature until the fall of the Third Republic in 1940.

It was only in 1916 that originaires were granted citizenship and explicit recognition of their full voting rights while maintaining legal protections. Blaise Diagne (1872-1934), who was the prime advocate behind the change, became in 1914 the first African deputy elected to the French National Assembly. From that time until independence in 1960, the deputies of the Four Communes were always African, and were at the forefront of the decolonisation struggle.

== List of députies elected to the French Parliament ==
The French Second Republic:

- Barthélémy Durand Valantin 1848–50 (Mixed race)
- Vacant 1850–52
- Abolished 1852–71

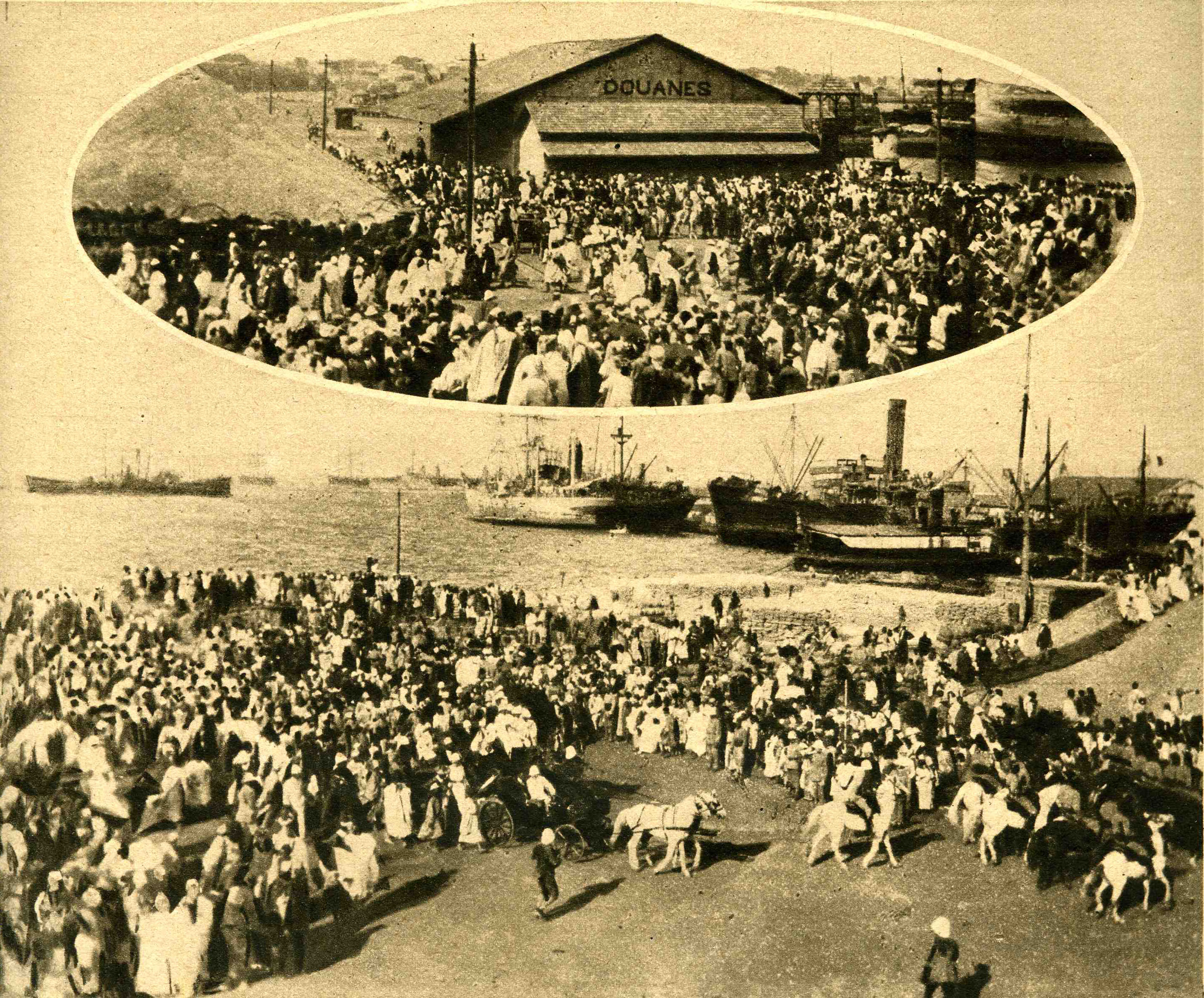
Arrival of Blaise Diagne, Deputy for Senegal, High Commissioner of the Government for the recruitment of black troops in Dakar in March 1918

The French Third Republic:

- Jean-Baptiste Lafon de Fongauffier 1871–76 (Mixed race)
- Abolished 1876–79
- Alfred Gasconi 1879–89 (Mixed race)
- Aristide Vallon 1889–93 (French)
- Jules Couchard 1893–98
- Hector D'Agoult 1898–1902
- François Carpot 1902–14 (Mixed race)
- Blaise Diagne 1914–34 (African)
- Galandou Diouf 1934–40 (African)

1945-1960:

- Amadou Lamine Guèye (African)
- Léopold Sédar Senghor (African)
- Mamadou Dia (African)
- Abbas Guèye (African)

== See also ==
- Dakar -- history and timeline
- Gorée -- history
- Rufisque -- history
- Saint-Louis -- history and timeline
- History of Senegal
- Assimilation (French colonialism)
