= Joseph Roger de Benoist =

French missionary, journalist and historian

Joseph-Roger de Benoist (2 August 1923 – 15 February 2017) was a French missionary, journalist, and historian. His main areas of study were French West Africa and the history of the Catholic Church in sub-Saharan Africa, particularly in Senegal, where he lived for several decades.

== Life and education ==
Joseph-Roger de Benoist was born in Meudon. He studied journalism at the École supérieure de journalisme de Lille and graduated from the Centre des Hautes Études sur l'Afrique (Paris) with a doctorate in history.

Benoist was ordained as a Catholic priest in 1950. He was part of the congregation of the White Fathers, also called the Missionaries of Africa (MAfr).

He died, aged 93, in Bry-sur-Marne, France.

== Honours ==
Father Joseph-Roger de Benoist was made Knight (1988) and then Officer (1997) of the French Legion of Honour. He was also an Officer in the Ordre national du Lion du Sénégal (1993).

== Works ==
- La balkanisation de l'Afrique occidentale francaise, (foreword by Léopold Sédar Senghor), 1979
- L'Église catholique et la naissance des nouvelles nations en Afrique occidentale francophone, 1981
- L'Afrique occidentale française de la Conférence de Brazzaville (1944) à l'indépendance (1960) (foreword by Amadou-Mahtar M'Bow), 1982
- Les missionnaires catholiques du Soudan français et de la Haute-Volta entrepreneurs et formateurs d'artisans, 1983
- Colonisation et évangélisation, 1985
- Église et pouvoir colonial au Soudan français : les relations entre les administrateurs et les missionaires catholiques dans la Boucle du Niger, de 1885 à 1945 (foreword by Catherine Coquery-Vidrovitch), 1987
- L'hebdomadaire catholique dakarois "Afrique Nouvelle" et la décolonisation de l'AOF, 1986
- Félix Éboué et les missions catholiques, 1987
- L'Église catholique en Afrique : deux millénaires d'histoire, 1991
- Gorée, Guide de l'île et du Musée historique, 1993 (in collaboration with Abdoulaye Camara)
- Le Mali, 1998
- Histoire de Gorée, 2003 (in collaboration with Abdoulaye Camara, Françoise Descamps, Xavier Ricou and James Searing)
- Léopold Sédar Senghor (with a testimony by Cheikh Hamidou Kane), 1998
- Histoire de l'Église catholique au Sénégal : du milieu du XV^{e} siècle à l'aube du troisième millénaire, 2008

== See also ==
- Gorée
- History of Senegal
