= United Nations Security Council Resolution 204 =

UN Security Council Resolution 204
- Date: May 19 1965
- Meeting no.: 1212
- Subject: Complaint by Senegal
- Voting summary: 11 voted for; None voted against; None abstained
- Result: Adopted

Security Council composition
- Permanent members: China; France; Soviet Union; United Kingdom; United States
- Non-permanent members: Bolivia; Ivory Coast; Jordan; Malaysia; Netherlands; Uruguay

United Nations Security Council Resolution 204, adopted unanimously on May 19, 1965, followed a complaint by Senegal against Portugal. The Council deplored incursions by Portuguese Armed Forces into Senegalese territory and requested that Portugal take all necessary measures to ensure Senegal’s territorial integrity.

== See also ==
- List of United Nations Security Council Resolutions 201 to 300 (1965–1971)
- Portuguese Empire
- United Nations Security Council Resolution 178
