= Radical-Socialist Party Camille Pelletan =

Political party in France

The Radical-Socialist Party Camille Pelletan (French: Parti radical-socialiste Camille Pelletan, PRS-CP) was a social liberal party in France founded in 1934 at the Clermont-Ferrand Congress of the Radical-Socialist Party as a reaction to the participation of Radicals in the right-wing Gaston Doumergue cabinet. The PRS-CP was led by Gabriel Cudenet but never achieved any lasting success. In fact, only 3 parliamentarians identified with the PRS-CP in the 16th legislature (1936–1940). Most members rejoined the Radical Party post-war.

The PRS-CP, initially intended to bring together the left wing of the radical family, did not achieve the hoped-for success, and its leaders rejoined the "old" Radical Party after the Liberation. Gabriel Cudenet moved to the right and became president of the Rally of the Republican Left until his death in 1948.
