= Aristide Vallon =

French military commander and politician

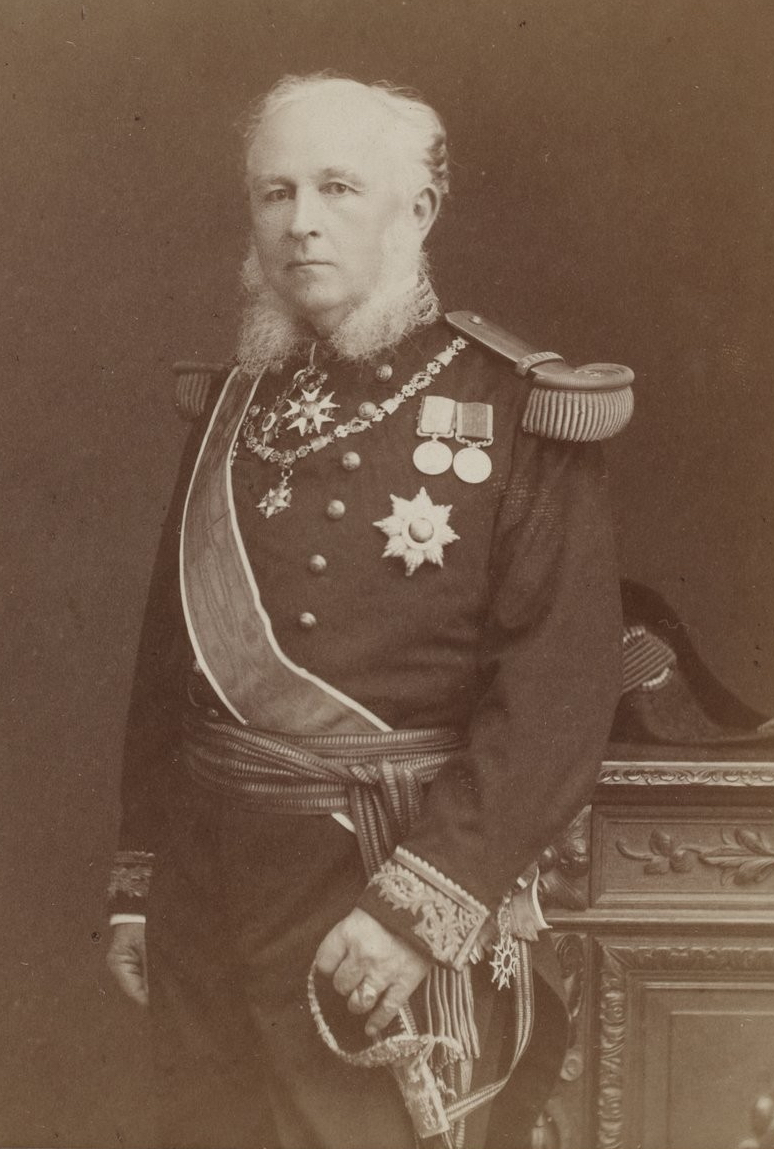
- Aristide Vallon

Colonial Governor of French Senegal
- In office 1882–?
- Preceded by: None
- Succeeded by: René Servatius

Deputy of French Senegal
- In office Late 1800s – ?

Deputy of Brest, France
- In office Late 1800s – ?

Personal details
- Born: Aristide Louis Antoine Vallon; July 26, 1826 Le Conquet, Brittany, France
- Died: March 11, 1897 (aged 70) Paris, France

Military service
- Allegiance: France
- Rank: Counter Admiral
- Awards: Légion d'honneur (Commandeur)

Counter Admiral Aristide Louis Antoine Vallon (July 26, 1826 – March 11, 1897) was born in Le Conquet. He became Commandeur of the Légion d'honneur on January 18, 1881, and was appointed Governor of Senegal the following year. After serving in this position, he became Deputy of Senegal and subsequently Deputy of Finistère. He died in Paris and was buried in Mirepoix, Ariège.
