= George Fall =

Los Angeles Common Council member

George Fall was an American politician. He was a member of the Los Angeles, California, Common Council, the governing body of that city, in 1870–71 and was present when a mob lynched 18 Chinese in the Chinese massacre of 1871.

During a coroner's inquest that followed the riot on October 24, 1871, Fall was identified as having attacked an influential Chinese leader, Yo Hing, with a plank of wood. During the inquest, Fall stated that he saw Yo Hing "immediately after Thompson was shot" running through the Blue Wing Saloon. He attacked Yo Hing in retribution for killing one of his horses during a melee the year before.
