= List of colonial governors of Senegal =

Tenure	Incumbent	Notes
French rule of Saint-Louis, Senegal and Gorée Island by Chartered Companies
Expanding to small posts along West African Coast as Far as Gabon until 1850s
Governors of the Compagnie Normande
1626 to 1658		
1626–1631	Jacques Fumechon	
1631–1641	Thomas Lambert	
1641–1648	Jean Caullier	
1649–1650	de Soussy	
1651–1658	Mésineau	
Governors of the Compagnie du Cap-Vert et du Sénégal
1658 to 1664		
1658–1661	Raguenet	
1661–28 May 1664	de Boulay	
Governors of the Compagnie Française des Indes Occidentales
1664 to 1672		
28 May 1664 – 1668	Jacquet	
1668– 9 April 1672	Sieur de Richemont	
Governor of the Compagnie du Sénégal
1672 to 1673		
1672–1673	Sieur de Richemont	(acting)
Director of the Compagnie du Sénégal
1674 to 1682		
1674–1682	Jacques Fumechon	
Director of the Compagnie d'Afrique
1682 to 1684		
1682–12 September 1684	Denis Basset	
Directors of the Compagnie de Guinée
1684 to 1696		
12 September 1684 – 1689	Louis Moreau de Chambonneau	(1st time)
1689–1690	Michel Jajolet de la Courbe	
1690 – Jan 1693	Louis Moreau de Chambonneau	(2nd time)
Jan 1693 – Jul 1693	n/a	Vacant
Jul 1693 – Mar 1696	Jean Bourguignon	(2nd time)
Directors of the Compagnie Royale du Sénégal
1696 to 1709		
Mar 1696– 4 April 1697	Jean Bourguignon	(acting)
4 April 1697 – 1 May 1702	André Brue	(b. 1654–d. 1738)
1702–1706	Joseph Lemaitre	(b. 1654–d. 1738)
1706–1709	Michel Jajolet de la Courbe	(b. 1654–d. 1738)
Directors of the Compagnie de Rouen
1710 to 1718		
1710–15 August 1711	Guillaume Joseph Mustellier	(d. 1711)
1712– 2 May 1713	Pierre de Richebourg	
20 April 1714 – 15 December 1718	André Brué	
Directors of the Compagnie des Indes Orientales
1718 to 1758		
15 December 1718 – May 1720	André Brue	
May 1720 – Apr 1723	Nicolas Desprès de Saint-Robert	(d. 1725 or 1726) (1st time)
1723–1725	Julien du Bellay	
1725	Nicolas Desprès de Saint-Robert	(2nd time)
1725–1726	Arnaud Plumet	
1726–1733	Jean Levens de la Rouquette	
1733– 7 March 1733	Lejuge	(d. 1733)
1733–1738	Sebastian Devaulx	(acting to 1736)
1738–1746	Pierre Félix Barthélemy David	(b. 1711–d. 1795)
1746–30 April 1758	Jean-Baptiste Estoupan de la Brüe	
British Seizure of Senegalese Possessions Ruled From Gorée Island and The Gambia.
British Governors
1758 to 1779		
30 April 1758 – 10 February 1763	Richard Alchorne Worge	
10 February 1763 – 25 May 1765	John Barnes	
25 May 1765 – Nov 1775	Charles O'Hara	
25 May 1765 – Apr 1766	Joseph Debat	(Gambia Superintendent of Trade)
Nov 1775– 8 April 1777	Matthias MacNamara	
8 April 1777 – 18 August 1778	John Clarke	
18 August 1778 – 11 February 1779	William Lacy	(did not assume office)
18 August 1778 – 11 February 1779	George Fall	(acting)
British Lieutenant Governors
1776 to 1779		
Apr 1776–24 January 1774	Joseph Debat	
24 January 1774 – Aug 1775	William Myres	
Aug 1774 – Nov 1775	Matthias MacNamara	
Nov 1775 – Dec 1775	Thomas Sharpless	(acting)
Dec 1775– 8 August 1776	Joseph Wall	(b. 1737–d. 1802)
8 August 1776 – 1776	George Fall	(acting) (1st time)
1776–18 August 1778	William Lacy	(acting)
18 August 1778 – 11 February 1779	George Fall	(acting) (2nd time)
French Reclaiming of Senegalese Possessions Ruled From Saint-Louis, Senegal and Gorée Island.
Royal government, then French First Republic, then French First Empire. From 1789 under Ministry of the Navy, controlling all posts to Gabon.
French Governors
1779 to 1809		
11 February 1779 – Mar 1779	Armand Louis de Gontaut	duc de Lauzun (b. 1747–d. 1793)
Mar 1779– 7 March 1781	Jacques Joseph Eyries	
7 March 1781 – Jul 1782	J.B. Bertrand	(acting)
Jul 1782 – Feb 1784	Anne Gaston Dumontet	
Feb 1784 – Feb 1786	Louis Legardeur	sieur de Repentigny (b. 1721–d. 1786)
Feb 1786 – Dec 1787	Stanislas Jean Boufflers	chevalier de Boufflers (b. 1738–d. 1815)
Dec 1787 – Jan 1801	François Blanchot de Verly	(b. 17..–d. 1807)(1st time)
Jan 1801– 2 July 1802	Charbonnes	(acting)
2 July 1802 – 27 October 1802	Louis Henri Pierre Lasserre	
27 October 1802 – 12 September 1807	François Blanchot de Verly	(2nd time)
Sep 1807–13 July 1809	Pierre Levasseur	
British Seizure of Senegalese Possessions Ruled From Gorée Island and The Gambia.
British Governors
1809 to 1817		
13 July 1809 – 1811	Charles William Maxwell	(d. 1848)
1811–1814	Charles MacCarthy	(b. 1764–d. 1824)
1814–25 January 1817	Thomas Brereton	
French Reclaim Senegalese Possessions Ruled From Saint-Louis, Senegal and Gorée Island.
Royal government restored by British. Under Ministry of the Navy, controlling all posts to Gabon until the 1850s.
French Commandants
1817 to 1828		
25 January 1817 – Dec 1817	Julien Schmaltz	(1st time)
Dec 1817–13 March 1819	Aimé-Benjamin Fleuriau	(acting)
13 March 1819 – 14 August 1820	Julien Schmaltz	(2nd time)
14 August 1820 – 1 March 1821	Louis-Jean-Baptiste Le Coupé de Montereau, baron Lecoupe	(acting)
1 March 1821 – 18 May 1827	Jacques-François Roger, baron Roger after 1824	(b. 1787 )
18 May 1827 – 7 January 1828	Hyacinthe-Benjamin Gerbidon	(acting)
French Governors
7 January 1828 – 11 May 1829	Jean Jubelin	(b. 1787)
11 May 1829 – 24 May 1831	Pierre-Édouard Brou	
24 May 1831 – 18 October 1833	Thomas Renault de Saint-Germain	(d. 1833)
18 October 1833 – 15 November 1833	Jean-Baptiste Bertrand Armand Cadéot	(acting)
13 November 1833 – 10 May 1834	Eustache-Louis-Jean Quernel	
10 May 1834 – 1 July 1836	Louis Pujol	
1 July 1836 – Dec 1836	Médéric Malavois	
Dec 1836–13 September 1837	Louis-Laurent-Auguste Guillet	(acting)
13 September 1837 – 12 April 1839	Julien-Armand Soret	
1839–1854: Posts from Gambia south under command of Naval Division of the Western Coasts of Africa. See Colonial heads of Gabon
12 April 1839 – 19 May 1841	Pons-Guillaume-Bazile Charmasson de Puylaval	(b. 1780)
19 May 1841 – 7 May 1842	Jean-Baptiste Montagniès de La Roque	(b. 1761)
1842–1860: For subdivision Colony of Gorée and Dependencies see Colonial heads of Côte d'Ivoire
7 May 1842 – 5 February 1843	Paul Pageot Des Noutières	
5 February 1843 – 24 May 1844	Édouard Bouët-Willaumez	(b. 1808–d. 1871)
24 May 1844 – Jul 1844	Auguste-Lazare Laborel	(acting)
Jul 1844–11 December 1845	Pierre Thomas	(acting)
11 December 1845 – 20 March 1846	François-Marie-Charles Ollivier	(d. 1846)
20 March 1846 – 30 August 1846	Hoube	(acting)
30 August 1846 – 24 August 1847	Ernest Bourdon, count of Gramont	(b. 1805–d. 1847)
24 August 1847 – 7 September 1847	Caille	(acting) (d. 1847)
7 September 1847 – Nov 1847	Léandre Bertin du Château	(acting) (b. 1804–d. 1884)
Nov 1847 – Aug 1850	Auguste Baudin	(b. 1800–d. 1877)
Aug 1850–11 October 1850	Aumont	(acting)
11 October 1850 – 16 December 1854	Auguste Léopold Protet	(1st time) (b. 1808–d. 1862)
May 1853–30 January 1854	André César Vérand	(acting for Protet)
31 January 1854 – 16 December 1854	Auguste Léopold Protet	(2nd time)
1854: all other West African possessions fall under subdivision of Senegal: Colony of Gorée and Dependencies.
16 December 1854 – 1 June 1861	Louis Léon César Faidherbe	(b. 1818–d. 1889)
4 September 1858 – 12 February 1859	A. Robin	(acting for Faidherbe)
4 October 1860: Ivory Coast territory moved to the Ivory Coast-Gabon colony see Colonial heads of Côte d'Ivoire
1 June 1861 – 1 December 1861	Léopold François Stephan	(acting) (b. 1815)
1 December 1861 – 13 May 1863	Jean Bernard Jauréguiberry	(b. 1815–d. 1887)
13 May 1863 – 14 July 1863	Émile Pinet-Laprade	(1st time)(b. 1822–d. 1869)(acting)
14 July 1863 – 1 May 1865	Louis Léon César Faidherbe	(2nd time)
1 May 1865 – 17 August 1869	Émile Pinet-Laprade	(2nd time) (acting to 12 July 1865)
18 August 1869 – 17 October 1869	Ferdinand Charles Alexandre Tredos	(b. 1820 )(acting)
17 October 1869 – 18 June 1876	François-Xavier Michel Valière	(b. 1826–d. 1886)
18 June 1876 – Apr 1880	Louis Briere de l'Isle	(b. 1827–d. 1896)
27 February 1880: Haut-Sénégal military region created as sub division. See Colonial heads of Mali
Apr 1880– 4 August 1881	Louis Ferdinand de Lanneau	(b. 1822 )
4 August 1881 – Oct 1881	Marie Auguste Deville de Perière	(b. 1825 ) (acting)
Oct 1881–28 June 1882	Henri Philibert Canard	(b. 1824–d. 1894)
1882: Coastal sections of Guinea separated from Senegal, become Rivières du Sud, later French Guinee.
28 June 1882 – 16 November 1882	Aristide Louis Antoine Vallon	(b. 1826–d. 1897)
16 November 1882 – 28 June 1883	René Servatius	
28 June 1883 – 25 July 1883	Adolphe Ernest Auguste Le Boucher	(b. 1837–d. 1896) (acting)
25 July 1883 – 15 April 1884	Henry Bourdiaux	(acting) (b. 1838–d. 1899)
15 April 1884 – 14 April 1886	Alphonse Seignac-Lesseps	
1886: Gabon and Eastern coastal possessions separated from Senegal, become French Congo
14 April 1886 – 29 April 1888	Jules Genouille	(b. 1839–d. 1923)
29 April 1888 – 22 September 1890	Léon Émile Clément-Thomas	
18 August 1890: French Sudan Territory separated from Senegal. See: Colonial heads of Mali
22 September 1890 – 19 May 1895	Henri Félix de Lamothe	(b. 1843–d. 1926)
19 May 1895 – 28 June 1895	Louis Mouttet	(acting)(b. 1857–d. 1902)
Incorporated into French West Africa – 16 June 1895 Command of French West Africa Handed to Governor General
Governors of Sénégal now subordinate to Governor General of French West Africa
28 June 1895 – 1 November 1900	Jean Baptiste Émile Louis	(b. 1853–d. 19..)
1 November 1900 – 26 January 1902	Noël Eugène Ballay	(b. 1847–d. 1902)
26 January 1902 – 15 March 1902	Pierre Paul Marie Capest	(b. 1857–d. 19..)
15 March 1902 – 11 November 1902	Ernest Roume	(b. 1858–d. 1934)
11 November 1902 – 26 August 1907	Camille Lucien Xavier Guy	(b. 1860–d. 1929)
26 August 1907 – 15 December 1907	Joost van Vollenhoven	(acting) (b. 1877–d. 1918)
15 December 1907 – 10 June 1908	Martial Henri Merlin	(b. 1860–d. 1935)
10 June 1908 – 17 October 1908	Jean Jules Émile Peuvergne	(b. 1849–d. 19..)(1st time)
17 October 1908 – 23 February 1909	Maurice Gourbeil	
23 February 1909 – 2 May 1909	Marie Antoine Edmond Gaudard (acting)	
2 May 1909 – 5 February 1911	Jean Jules Émile Peuvergne	(2nd time)
5 February 1911 – 13 May 1914	Henri François Charles Core	
13 May 1914 – 1916	Raphaël Valentin Marius Antonetti	(b. 1872–d. 1938)
20 March 1917 – 23 September 1920	Fernand Émile Levêque	
23 September 1920 – 17 September 1921	Théophile Antoine Pascal	(acting)
17 September 1921 – 4 July 1925	Pierre Jean Henri Didelot	(b. 1870–d. 19..)
4 July 1925 – 23 May 1926	Camille Théodore Raoul Maillet	(1st time) (acting)
23 May 1926 – 23 October 1926	Joseph Zébédée Olivier Cadier	(acting)
23 October 1926 – 12 March 1929	Léonce Alphonse Noël Henri Jore	(b. 1882–d. 1975)
12 March 1929 – 4 July 1930	Maurice Beurnier (1st time)	(b. 1878–d. 19..)
4 July 1930 – 15 August 1931	Camille Théodore Raoul Maillet	(2nd time)
15 August 1931 – 14 October 1931	Benoît Louis Rebonne	(acting)
14 October 1931 – Dec 1936	Maurice Beurnier	(2nd time)
Dec 1936–25 October 1938	Louis Lefebvre	
25 October 1938 – 1940	Jean Paul Parisot	
1 January 1941 – 22 December 1942	Georges Pierre Rey	
22 December 1942 – 2 December 1943	Hubert Jules Deschamps	(b. 1900–d. 1979)
2 December 1943 – Jun 1945	Charles Jean Dagain	(b. 1885–d. 1969)
Jun 1945 – Apr 1946	Pierre Louis Maestracci	
Apr 1946–20 May 1947	Oswald Durand	(b. 1888–d. 1982)
20 May 1947 – 19 October 1950	Laurent Marcel Wiltord	
19 October 1950 – 25 April 1952	Camille Victor Bailly	(b. 1907–d. 1984)
25 April 1952 – 19 February 1954	Lucien Eugène Geay	(b. 1900)
19 February 1954 – 31 October 1955	Maxime Marie Antoine Jourdain	
31 October 1955 – 10 February 1957	Jean Colombani	(b. 1903)
10 February 1957 – 25 November 1958	Pierre Auguste Michel Marie Lami	(b. 1909)
African High Commissioner of the French Union
25 November 1958 – 20 June 1960	Pierre Auguste Michel Marie Lami	

== See also ==
- Timeline of Saint-Louis, Senegal
