= Rufisque =

Rufisque روفيسك
- City
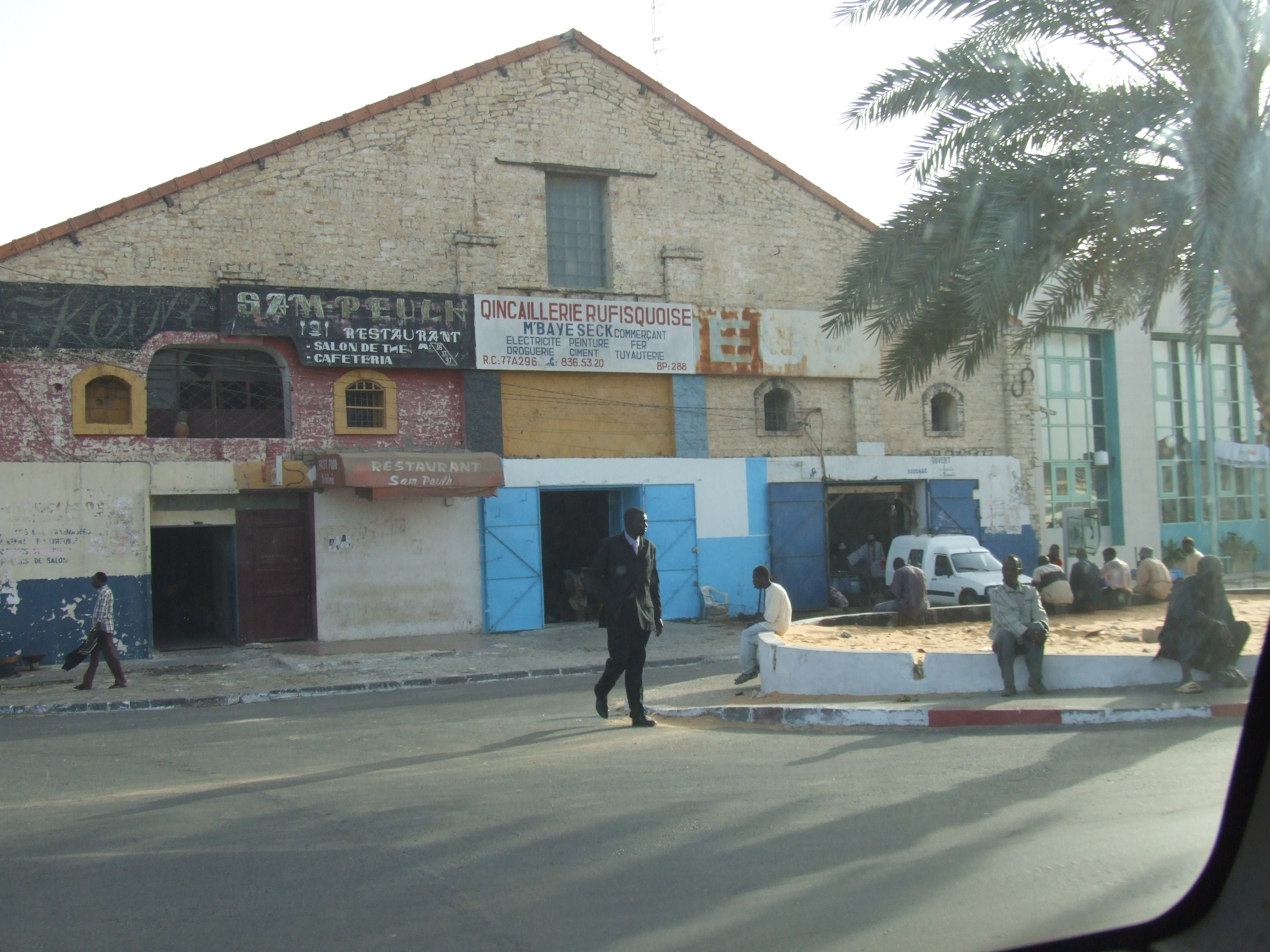
- Industrial Rufisque, 2006

- Location within Senegal
- Coordinates: 14°43′N 17°16′W
- Country: Senegal
- Region: Dakar Region

Population (2023 census)
  - Total: 295,459
- Time zone: UTC+0 (GMT)

Rufisque (Arabic: روفيسك; Wolof: Tëngeéj) is a city in the Dakar region of western Senegal, at the base of the Cap-Vert Peninsula 25 kilometres (16 mi) east of Dakar, the capital. It has a population of 295,459 (2023 census). In the past it was an important port city in its own right, but is now a suburb of Dakar.

Rufisque is also the capital of the department of the same name.

== History ==
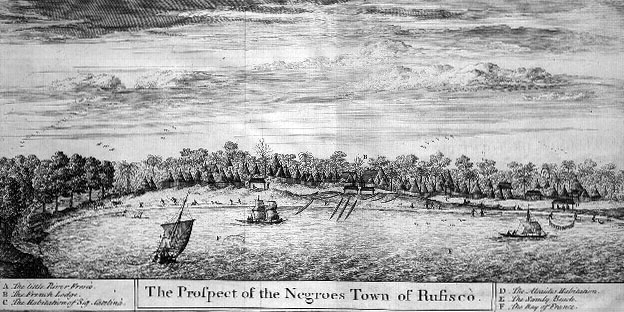
Drawing of Rufisco in 1732.

Originally a Lebou fishing village called Tenguedj (Wolof: Tëngéej), Rufisque became important in the 16th century as the principal port of the kingdom of Cayor, being frequented by Portuguese (who named it Rio Fresco, meaning "Freshwater River", hence the name of the modern city), Dutch, French and English traders. A Euro-African Creole, or Métis, community of merchants grew up there, in close contact with similar communities in Saint Louis, Gorée and other places along the Petite Côte (Saly-Portudal, Joal) south to the Gambia River. By the 1650s, the Dutch West India Company had consolidated control over the coastal trade and built a fortified factory at Rufisque.

In 1840 a couple of Saint Louis merchants built warehouses on the waterfront to stock peanuts. Gorée merchants followed suit. There followed a period of commercial expansion as peanut production in Cayor boomed. In 1859 a fort was built by the French and Rufisque was annexed to the Colony of Senegal. The "Escale" commercial and administrative neighborhood along the waterfront was laid out in 1862—the African inhabitants being pushed out in the process. Rufisque became a "commune" in 1880 and its port was connected to the Dakar-Saint Louis railroad in 1885. In 1909 Galandou Diouf (died 1941) was elected to represent Rufisque in the General Council of the colony in Saint Louis, being the first African elected to that position.

In July 2025, France returned the Rufisque military base to Senegal.

=== Decline of port ===
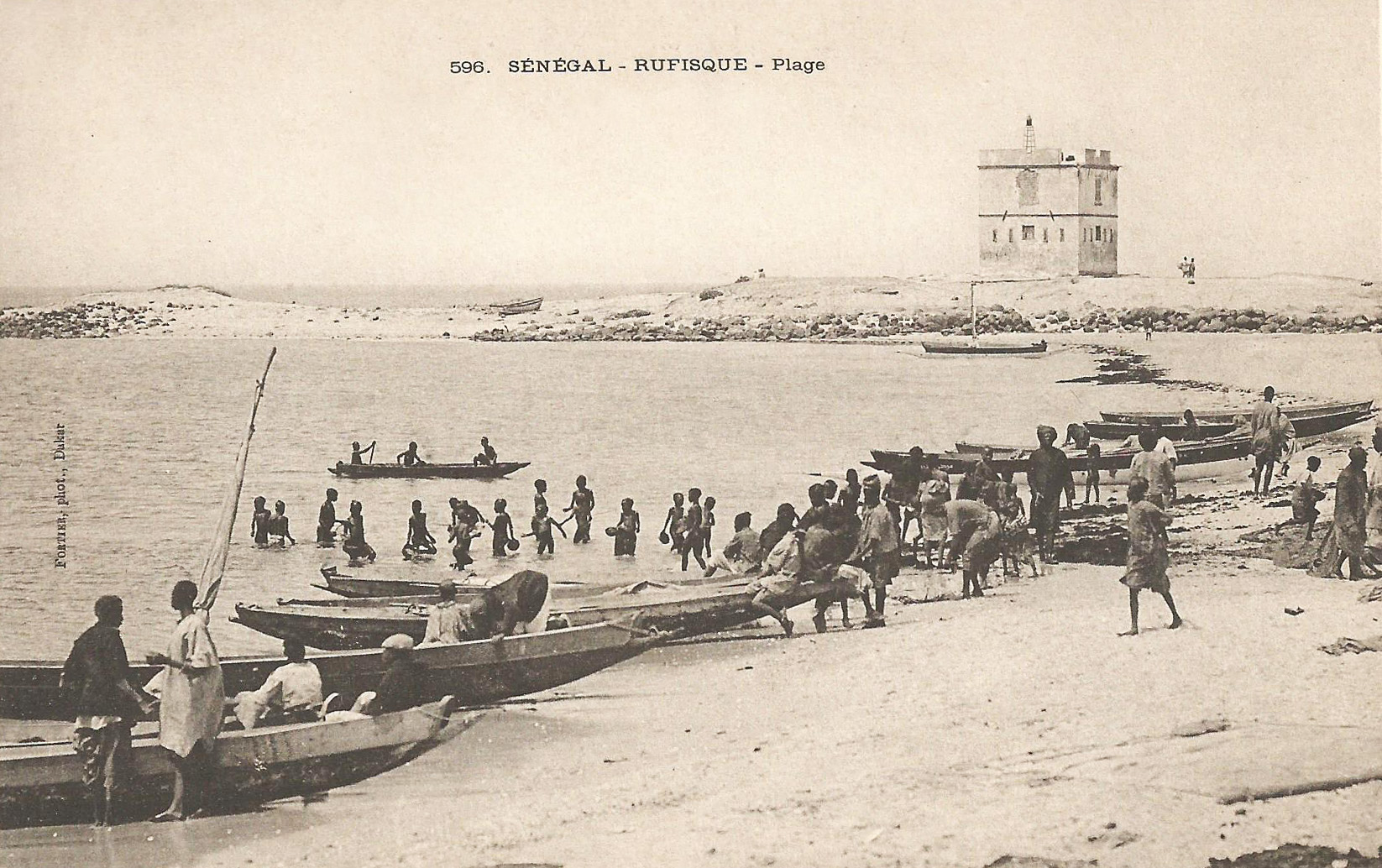
Beach in Rufisque

Early in the 20th century the growth of neighboring Dakar, with its superior port facilities, signaled the decline of Rufisque. No longer an active port, Rufisque has experienced steep industrial decline. Relatively neglected compared to rest of Senegal's four historic communes, it has no tourism sector and a chronic lack of investment in public infrastructure.

== Industry ==
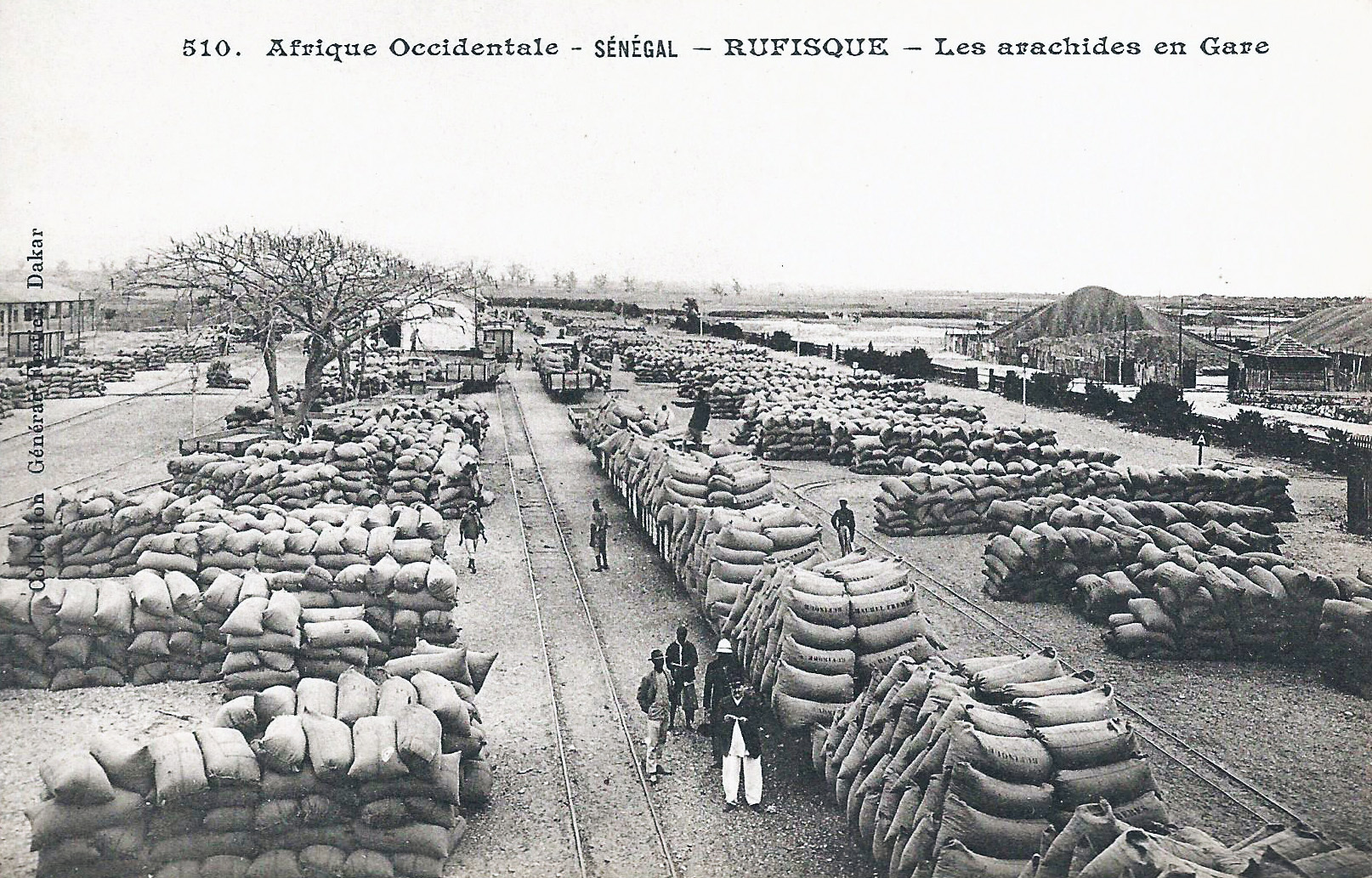
Rufisque - groundnuts stored at the train station

Rufisque has a cement works.

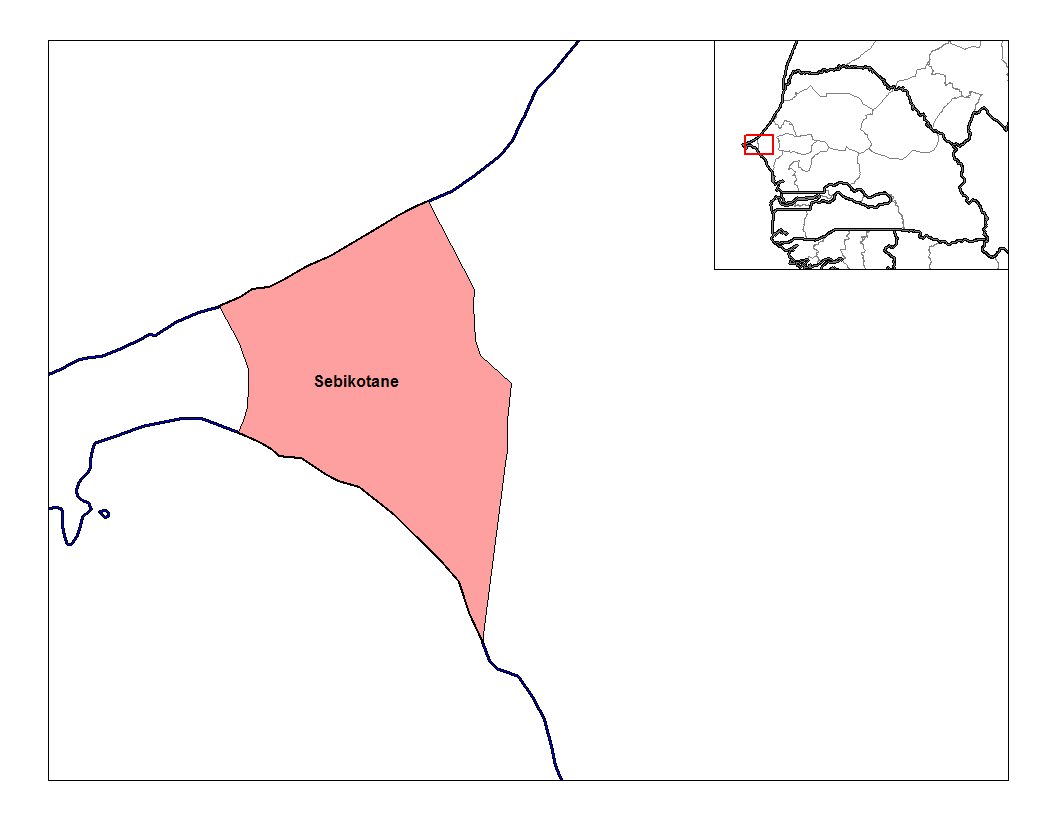
Rufisque Arrondissement

== Administration ==
Omar Cissé took office as Mayor of Rufisque on 28 January 2022. Previously, Mbaye-Jacques Diop was Mayor from 1987 to 2002, and subsequently designated as Honorary Mayor, and Ndiawar Touré served from June 2002.

== Notable people ==
- Papa Bouba Diop - footballer
- Mamadou Seck (footballer) - footballer
- Ousmane Diop Socé - writer and politician
- Thierno Youm - footballer
- Abdoulaye Sadji - Writer

== See also ==
- Railway stations in Senegal
