= First Oury government =

- Cabinet of Guinea

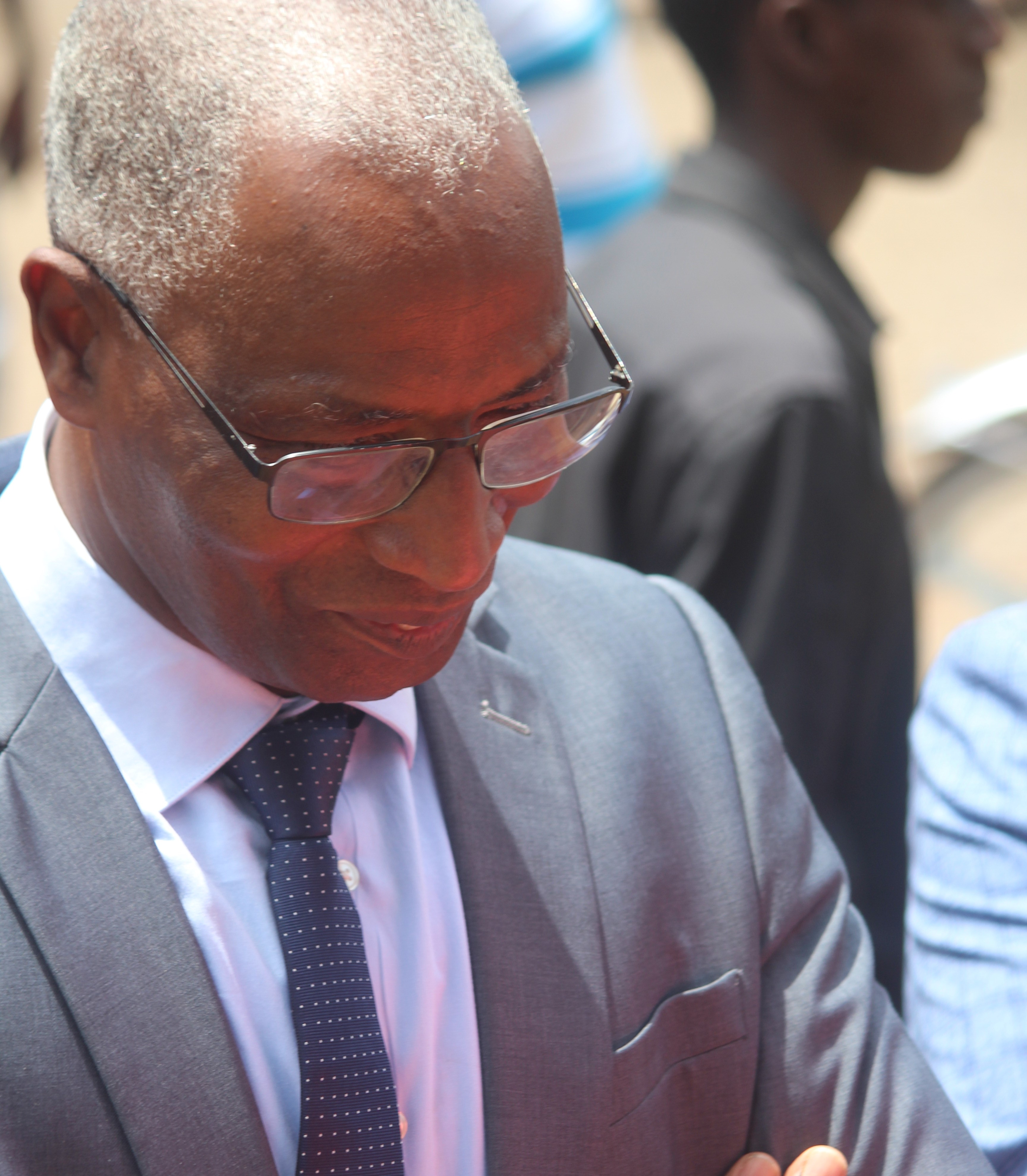
- Date formed: 13 March 2024
- Date dissolved: 27 January 2026

People and organisations
- Head of state: Mamadi Doumbouya
- Head of government: Bah Oury
- Total no. of members: 34
- Member party: National Committee of Reconciliation and Development

History
- Predecessor: Béavogui/Goumou government
- Successor: Second Oury government

The First Bah government was the Guinean government during the transition led by Colonel and later General Mamadi Doumbouya.

Amadou Oury Bah was the acting head of government from 27 February 2024 to 22 January 2026.

== History of the mandate ==
Led by Prime Minister of Guinea Amadou Oury Bah, this government succeeded the Béavogui/Goumou government, which was dissolved on 19 February 2024.

The government structure was unveiled on 5 March 2024 composed of 29 ministers including 2 secretaries-general.

On 13 March 2024, the Prime Minister appointed the members of his government, composed of 23 men and six women.

The Minister of Transport, Ousmane Gaoual Diallo, is chosen as the Government spokesperson.

On Saturday 23 March 2024, Prime Minister Amadou Oury Bah lead members of the government, the Minister Secretary General of the Presidency Amara Camara nd the Minister Director of the Presidency's Cabinet Djiba Diakité for a 48-hour immersion. The new government met at the Kalako military camp in the rear area of the Guinean Special Forces Group and on Sunday 24 March 2024, in the 1st military region of Guinea in Kindia.

On 30 June 2025, the composition of five ministries are split into 10 ministries.

On 29 July 2025, a government reshuffle was marked by the arrival of five new members, including one woman, and the transfer of two ministers to other ministries. Among the new honorable members was Cellou Baldé, single-member deputy for Labé representing the opposition party UFDG, led by Cellou Dalein Diallo.

Following the inauguration of President Mamadi Doumbouya, the government submitted its resignation, which was accepted on 22 January 2026.

== Composition ==
=== Initial ===
Portrait	Office	Minister
	Prime minister of Guinea	Amadou Oury Bah
	Minister of National Defense	Aboubacar Sidiki Camara
	Keeper of the Seals, Minister of Justice and Human Rights	Yaya Kairaba Kaba
	Minister of Culture and Crafts	Moussa Moïse Sylla (until 29 July 2025)
	Minister of Tourism and Hospitality	Moussa Moïse Sylla (until 29 July 2025)
	Ministry of Infrastructure and Public Works	Mahamadou Abdoulaye Diallo (until 29 July 2025)
	Ministre de la Santé et de l'Hygiène publique	Dr Oumar Diouhé Bah
	Ministry of the Environment and Sustainable Development	Djami Diallo
	Ministry of Territorial Administration and Decentralization	Ibrahima Kalil Condé
	Ministry of Higher Education and Scientific Research	Alpha Bacar Barry
	Ministry of Mines and Geology	Bouna Sylla
	Ministry of Urban Affairs and Spatial Planning	Mory Condé
	Ministry of Youth and Sports	Keamou Bogola Haba (until 29 July 2025)
	Ministry of Posts, Telecommunications and Digital Economy	Rose Pola Pricemou
	Ministry of Economy and Finance	Mourana Soumah
	Ministry of Budget	Facinet Sylla
	Minister of Labour and the Civil Service	Faya François Bourouno
	Ministry of Security and Civil Protection	Bachir Diallo
	Ministry of Industry and Commerce	Dr Diaka Sidibé (until 29 July 2025)
	Ministry of Women, Family and Solidarity	Charlotte Daffé
	Minister of Pre-University Education and Literacy	Jean Paul Cedy
	Ministry of Technical Education, Vocational Training and Employment	Aminata Kaba
	Ministry of Foreign Affairs, African Integration and Guineans Living Abroad	Dr Morissanda Kouyaté
	Ministry of Agriculture and Livestock	Felix Lamah (until 29 July 2025)
	Ministry of Fisheries and Maritime Economy	Fatima Camara (until 29 July 2025)
	Ministry of Information and Communication	Fana Soumah
	Ministry of Sanitation, Water Resources and Hydrocarbons	Aboubacar Camara (until 29 July 2025)
	Ministry of Planning, International Cooperation and Development	Ismaël Nabé
	Ministry of Transport	Ousmane Gaoual Diallo
	Minister Secretary General of the Government	Benoît Kamano
	Minister Secretary General for Religious Affairs	Karamoko Diawara

=== Cabinet reshuffle of 29 July 2025 ===
Portrait	Office	Portfolio
	Prime minister of Guinea	Amadou Oury Bah
	Minister of National Defense	Aboubacar Sidiki Camara
	Keeper of the Seals, Minister of Justice and Human Rights	Yaya Kairaba Kaba
	Minister of Culture and Crafts	Moussa Moise Sylla
	Minister of Tourism and Hospitality	Mahamadou Abdoulaye Diallo
	Ministry of Infrastructure and Public Works	Laye Sékou Camara
	Ministry of Health	Oumar Diouhé Bah
	Ministry of the Environment and Sustainable Development	Djami Diallo
	Ministry of Territorial Administration and Decentralization	Ibrahima Kalil Condé
	Ministry of Higher Education and Scientific Research	Alpha Bacar Barry
	Ministry of Mines and Geology	Bouna Sylla
	Ministry of Urban Affairs and Spatial Planning	Mory Condé
	Ministry of Youth	Cellou Baldé
	Ministry of Sports	Keamou Bogola Haba
	Ministry of Posts, Telecommunications and Digital Economy	Rose Pola Pricemou
	Ministry of Economy and Finance	Mourana Soumah
	Ministry of Budget	Facinet Sylla
	Minister of Labour and the Civil Service	Faya François Bourouno
	Ministry of Security and Civil Protection	Bachir Diallo
	Ministry of Commerce	Fatima Camara
	Minister of Industry and Small and Medium Enterprises	Dr Diaka Sidibé
	Ministry of Women, Family and Solidarity	Charlotte Daffé
	Minister of Pre-University Education and Literacy	Jean Paul Cedy
	Ministry of Technical Education, Vocational Training and Employment	Aminata Kaba
	Ministry of Foreign Affairs, African Integration and Guineans Living Abroad	Dr Morissanda Kouyaté
	Ministry of Agriculture	Mariama Cire Sylla
	Minister of Livestock	Felix Lamah
	Ministry of Fisheries and Maritime Economy	Fassou Théa
	Ministry of Information and Communication	Fana Soumah
	Ministry of Energy	Namory Camara
	Minister of Sanitation, Water Resources and Hydrocarbons	Aboubacar Camara
	Ministry of Planning, International Cooperation and Development	Ismaël Nabé
	Ministry of Transport	Ousmane Gaoual Diallo
	Minister Secretary General of the Government	Benoît Kamano
	Minister Secretary General for Religious Affairs	Karamoko Diawara

== See also ==
- Politics of Guinea
