= Second Oury government =

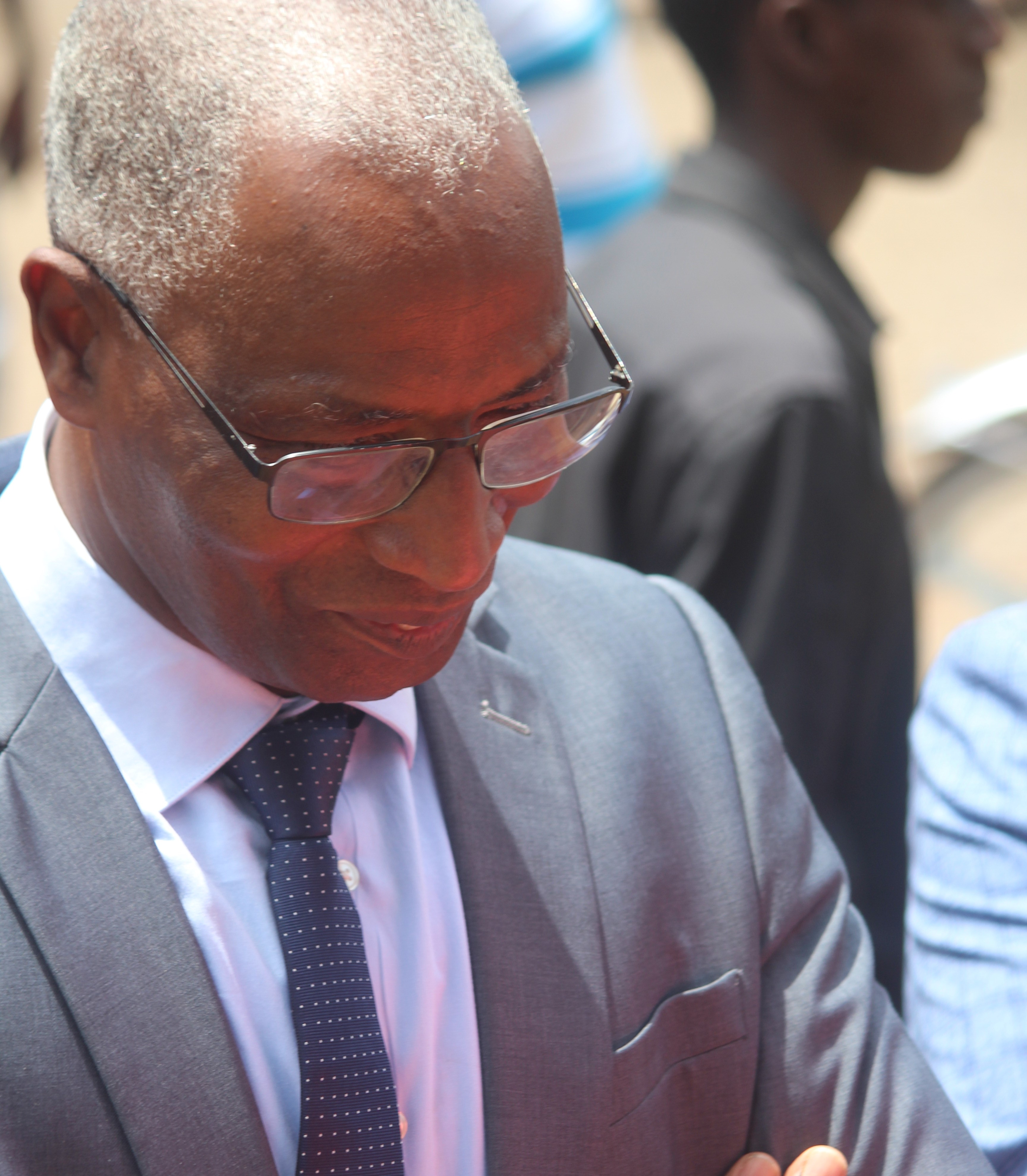
- Date formed: January 26, 2026

People and organisations
- President: Mamady Doumbouya
- Head of government: Bah Oury
- No. of ministers: 27

History
- Legislature term: National Committee of Reconciliation and Development
- Predecessor: First Oury government

The second Oury government constitutes the first Guinean government of the Fifth Republic, placed under the authority of President Mamady Doumbouya.

Amadou Oury Bah has held the position of head of government since 27 February 2024.

== History ==
Led by Prime Minister Amadou Oury Bah, this government succeeds its previous government under the transition which ended with the organization of the presidential election of 28 December 2025 which saw the victory of President Mamadi Doumbouya in the first round with 87.92% of the votes.

The government structure is unveiled on 26 January 2026 composed of 27 ministers including 2 secretaries-general.

On 2 February 2026, eighteen ministers and two secretaries-general were appointed as part of the partial formation of the government. On 3 February, two other members of the government were appointed and on 4 February 2026 the remainder of the seven ministers were appointed.

== Composition ==
=== Members ===
| Portrait | Office | Minister |
|---|---|---|
| | Prime minister | Amadou Oury Bah |
| | Keeper of the Seals, Minister of Justice and Human Rights | Ibrahima Sory II Tounkara |
| | Minister of National Defense | Aboubacar Sidiki Camara |
| | Ministry of Territorial Administration and Decentralization | Ibrahima Kalil Condé |
| | Ministry of Security and Civil Protection | General Ahmed Mohamed Oury Diallo |
| | Ministry of Foreign Affairs, African Integration and Guineans Living Abroad | Morissanda Kouyaté |
| | Ministry of Economy and Finance | Mariama Cire Sylla |
| | Ministry of Planning, International Cooperation and Development | Ismaël Nabé |
| | Ministry of Modernization of Administration and Public Service | Faya François Bourouno |
| | Minister of Employment, Labour and Social Protection | Mory Condé |
| | Ministry of Mines and Geology | Bouna Sylla |
| | Ministry of Agriculture | Aminata Kaba |
| | Ministry of Livestock | Felix Lamah |
| | Ministry of Fisheries and Maritime Economy | Fassou Théa |
| | Ministry of Industry and Commerce | Fatima Camara |
| | Ministry of Higher Education and Scientific Research | Dr Diaka Sidibé |
| | Ministry of National Education, Literacy, Technical Education and Vocational Training | Alpha Bacar Barry |
| | Ministry of Culture, Tourism and Handicrafts | Moussa Moïse Sylla |
| | Ministry of Health | Khaité Sall |
| | Ministry of Women, Family and Solidarity | Patricia Adeline Lamah |
| | Ministry of Youth and Sports | Cellou Baldé |
| | Ministry of Infrastructure | Facinet Sylla |
| | Ministry of Transport | Ousmane Gaoual Diallo |
| | Ministry of Communication, Digital Economy and Innovation | Mourana Soumah |
| | Ministry of the Environment and Sustainable Development | Djami Diallo |
| | Ministry of Energy | Laye Sékou Camara |
| | Minister of Sanitation, Water Resources and Hydrocarbons | Aboubacar Camara |
| | Ministry of Urban Affairs and Spatial Planning | Mohamed Lamine Sy Savané |
| | Minister Secretary General of the Government | Benoît Kamano |
| | Minister Secretary General for Religious Affairs | Karamoko Diawara |

== See also ==
- History of Guinean governments
