= Government ministries of Guinea =

Government ministries of Guinea make up the portfolios of the Cabinet of Guinea.

== Ministries ==
- Ministry of African Cooperation and Integration
- Ministry of Agriculture and Livestock
- Ministry of Budget
- Ministry of Culture, Tourism and Handicrafts
- Ministry of Economy and Finance
- Ministry of Energy
- Ministry of Health
- Ministry of Women, Family and Solidarity
- Ministry of National Unity and Citizenship
- Ministry of Public Works
- Ministry of Sanitation, Water Resources and Hydrocarbons
- Ministry of Trade, Industry and small-and-middle-sized Businesses
- Ministry of Transport
- Ministry of Urban Affairs and Spatial Planning
