= Aicha Nanette Conté =

Guinean diplomat and politician

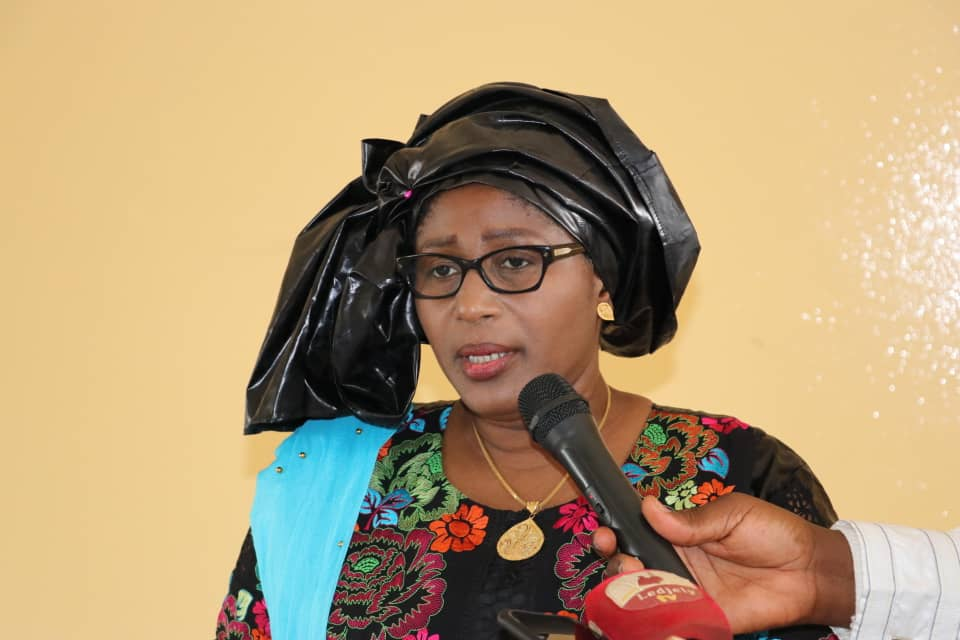

Ambassador of Guinea to Belgium
- Incumbent
- Assumed office 20 August 2025

Minister for the Promotion of Women, Children and Vulnerable Persons
- In office 26 October 2021 – 19 February 2024
- President: Mamadi Doumbouya
- Preceded by: Aissata Daffé
- Succeeded by: Charlotte Daffé

Personal details
- Born: Guinea

Aicha Nanette Conté is a Guinean diplomat and politician. She has been Ambassador of Guinea to Belgium since 20 August 2025. She previously served as the Minister for the Promotion of Women, Children and Vulnerable Persons in the governments under Prime Ministers Mohamed Béavogui and Bernard Goumou.

== Biography ==
=== Professional career ===
Before becoming a minister, she was a child protection specialist at UNICEF Guinea.

=== Minister ===
In the 2021 Guinean coup d'état, President Alpha Condé was overthrown and a new government was formed. Conté was appointed by decree on 26 October 2021 as Minister for the Promotion of Women, Children and Vulnerable Persons, replacing Aissata Daffé.

On 19 February 2024, the government led by Bernard Goumou of which she was a member was dissolved by the National Committee of Reconciliation and Development (CNRD).

=== Diplomat ===
On 20 August 2025, she was appointed as Guinea's ambassador to Belgium.
