= Yaya Sow =

Guinean politician

Minister of Infrastructure and Transportation
- In office 26 October 2021 – 17 November 2022
- President: Mamady Doumbouya
- Prime Minister: Mohamed Béavogui

Personal details
- Education: Gamal Abdel Nasser University of Conakry

Yaya Sow is a Guinean politician.

He was Ministry of Public Works in the government led by Mohamed Béavogui from October 2021 to November 17, 2022.

== Career ==
Before becoming a minister, he became the Consular Judge at the Tribunal de commerce of Guinea. He worked in numerous government positions including Director of Economic Studies and Commerce at the Guinean Ministry of Commerce before being hired by ECOWAS. He started at the Department of Political Economy of ECOWAS in Abuja, Nigeria, and rising through the ranks, became Resident Representative of ECOWAS to the European Union, eventually rising further to become Director of Economic Research at ECOWAS.

He also worked as an advisor for the Guinean private sector in negotiating the African Continental Free Trade Agreement.

He was decreed Minister of Infrastructure and Transportation on October 26, 202 to November 17, 2022.
