= Mamadou Pathé Diallo =

Guinean politician and diplomat

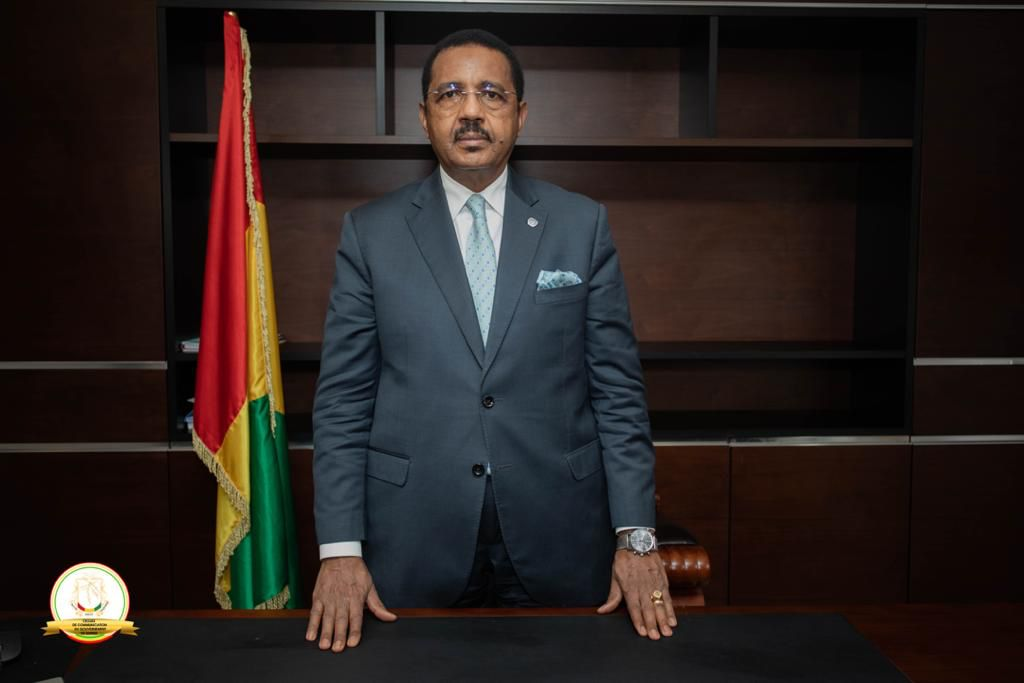
- Diallo in 2022

Minister for Public Health (Guinea)
- Incumbent
- Assumed office 25 October 2021
- President: Mamady Doumbouya
- Prime Minister: Mohamed Béavogui

Personal details
- Education: Gamal Abdel Nasser University of Conakry, San Diego State University, Université catholique de Louvain

Mamadou Pathé Diallo is a Guinean politician and diplomat, who is the current Minister for Public Health.

== Career ==
He has worked in many African countries representing various U.N. organizations including work for UNPF in Mali and Sierra Leone, work for the UNDP in Eritrea as well as work for WHO in Mauritania, work for UNAIDS in Senegal, work for MONUSCO in DRC, work for UNIOGBA in Guinea-Bissau.

He was named Minister of Health on October 25, 2021, replacing Remy Lamah.

In November 2023, the Court for the Repression of Economic and Financial Offenses (Crief), decided to indict Mamadou Péthé Diallo and place him under judicial supervision for charges of "embezzlement of public funds, illicit enrichment, money laundering, corruption, embezzlement and complicity.

Preceded by Remy Lamah	Minister of Health of Guinea; 2021–present	Succeeded by
