= Lamah =

Lamah is a surname. Notable people with the surname include:

- Édouard Niankoye Lamah, Guinean politician
- Patricia Lamah (born 1987), Guinean politician and hairdresser
- Roland Lamah (born 1987), Belgian footballer
- Remy Lamah, Guinean politician
