= Ministry of Energy (Guinea) =

Republic of Guinea government ministry

Minister of Energy of Guinea
- Ministère de l'Énergie
- Incumbent; Laye Sékou Camara since 2 February 2026
- Type: Ministry
- Reports to: President of Guinea
- Seat: Guinea
- Website: http://www.energie.gov.gn/

The Ministry of Energy (French: Ministère de l'Énergie) is a ministry of the Government of Guinea. The minister is a member of the Cabinet of Guinea.

== Ministers ==
Name	Dates of the term		Government(s)
Papa Koly Kourouma	24 December 2010	15 January 2014	Saïd Fofana I
Idrissa Thiam	20 January 2014	21 October 2014	Saïd Fofana II
Cheick Taliby Sylla	21 October 2014	12 May 2020	Saïd Fofana II, Youla and Kassory I
Bountouraby Yattara	19 June 2020	5 September 2021	Kassory II
Ibrahima Abé Sylla	4 November 2021	10 August 2022	Béavogui
Aly Seydouba Soumah	10 August 2022	19 February 2024	Goumou
Namory Camara	29 July 2025	22 January 2026	Bah Oury I
Laye Sékou Camara	2 February 2026	Incumbent	Bah Oury II
In the interval between two terms, the outgoing minister manages day-to-day affairs. Successive titles : 2018-2021: Energy Manager; 2021-2025: Energy, Hydropower and Hydrocarbons; Since 2025: Energy

== See also ==
- Government ministries of Guinea
