= Ministry of Trade, Industry and small-and-middle-sized Businesses (Guinea) =

Government ministry of Guinea

- Ministère du Commerce, de l’industrie et des petites et moyennes entreprises (French)

Ministry overview
- Jurisdiction: Government of Guinea
- Headquarters: Conakry
- Minister responsible: Bernard Goumou, Minister of Trade, Industry and small-and-middle-sized Businesses

The Ministry of Trade, Industry and small-and-middle-sized Businesses (ministère du Commerce, de l’industrie et des petites et moyennes entreprises) is a Guinean government ministry. The current minister is Bernard Goumou.

== Officeholders since 2010 ==
Name	Dates in Office		Government(s)
Mohamed Dorval Doumbouya	24/12/2010	15/01/2014	Saïd Fofana I
Marc Yombouno	24/01/2014	17/05/2018	Saïd Fofana II and Youla
Boubacar Barry	26/05/2018	15/01/2021	Kassory I
Mariama Camara	15/01/2021	05/09/2021	Kassory II
Bernard Goumou	27/10/2021	20/08/2022	Béavogui
Rose Pola Pricemou	20/08/2022	18/11/2022	Bernard Goumou
Louopou Lamah	18/11/2022	Incumbent	Bernard Goumou
