= Oury government =

Oury government may refer to:

- First Oury government
- Second Oury government
