= Ministry of Sanitation, Water Resources and Hydrocarbons (Guinea) =

Government ministry of Guinea

- Ministre de l'Assainissement, de l'Hydraulique et des Hydrocarbures (French)
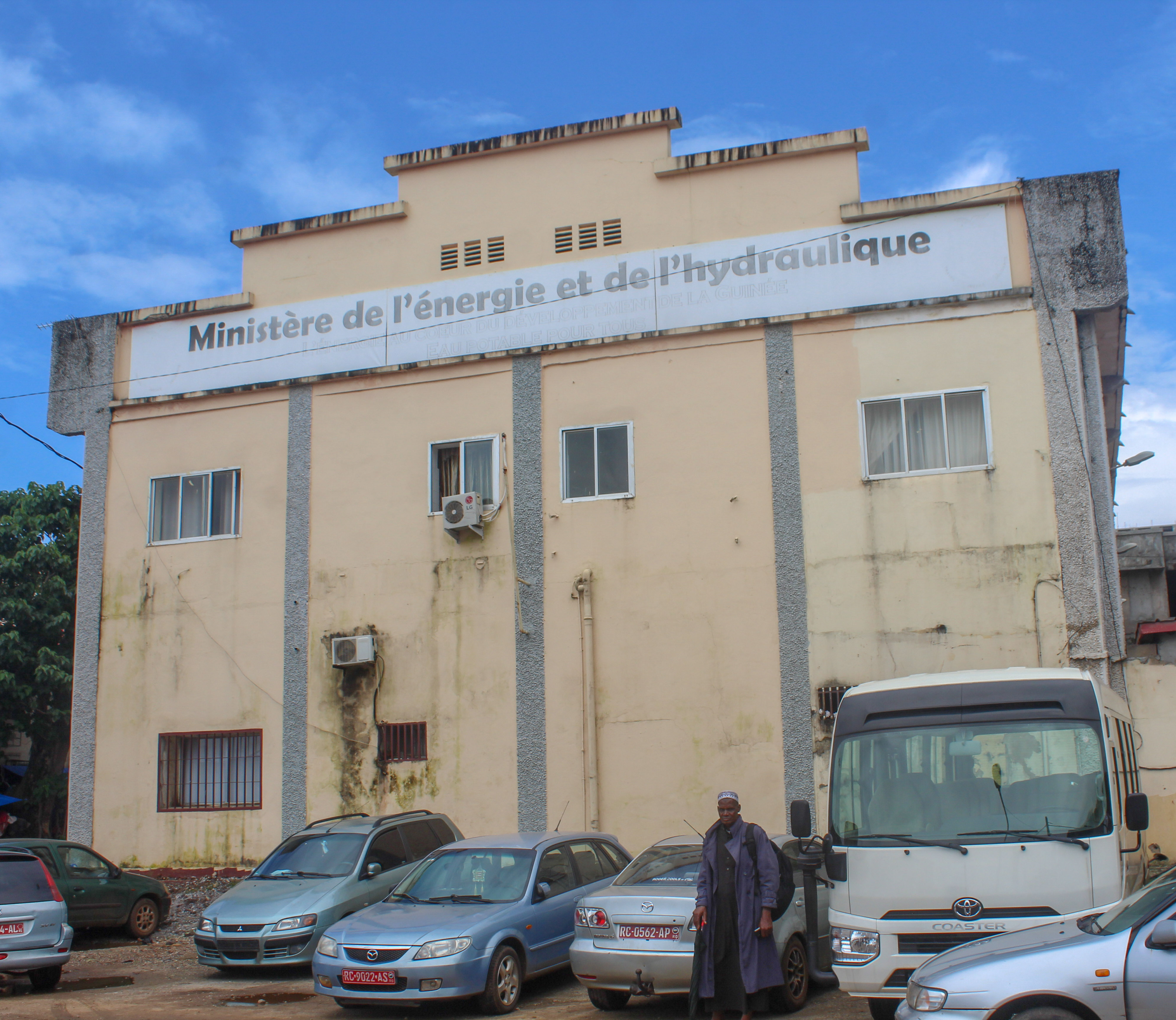

Ministry overview
- Jurisdiction: Government of Guinea
- Headquarters: Conakry
- Minister responsible: Aboubacar Camara, Minister of Sanitation, Water Resources and Hydrocarbons (Guinea)
- Ministry executive: www.sieguinee-dne.org (in French)]

The Ministry of Sanitation, Water Resources and Hydrocarbons is a Guinean government ministry whose current minister is Aboubacar Camara. It was previously Ibrahima Abé Sylla.

== Organization ==
- Minister
- Secretary General
- Chef de Cabinet
  - Energy Advisor
  - Legal Advisor
- Direction Nationale de l’Energie (DNE)
- Bureau de Stratégie et de Développement (BSD)
- Electricité de Guinée (EDG)
- Agence Guinéene de l’Electrification Rurale (AGER)

== Officeholders since 2010 ==
Name	Dates in Office		Government(s)
Diakaria Koulibaly	26 June 2018	05/09/2021	Kassory I and Kassory II
Ibrahima Abé Sylla	04/11/2021	In office	Béavogui
Aly Seydouba Soumah	10/08/2022	19 February 2024	Goumou
Aboubacar Camara	19 March 2024	Incumbent	Bah Oury I and Bah Oury II
In the interval between two terms, the outgoing minister manages day-to-day affairs. Successive titles: 2018-2021 : tasked with Hydrocarbures; 2021-2026 : Energy, Hydraulique and Hydrocarbons; Since 2026: Sanitation, Water and Hydrocarbons
