= Charlotte Daffé =

Advisor on sanitation and the environment to the president
- Incumbent
- Assumed office March 6, 2026

Minister for the Promotion of Women, Children and Vulnerable Persons
- In office March 13, 2024 – January 22, 2026

Minister of Fisheries, Aquaculture and Maritime Economy
- In office October 25, 2021 – February 19 , 2024

Charlotte Daffé is a Guinean politician. She was the Minister for the Promotion of Women, Children and Vulnerable Persons from 13 March 13, 2024 to January 22, 2026.

She is the Minister of Fisheries, Aquaculture and Maritime Economy in the government led by Mohamed Béavogui of October 25, 2021. She was reappointed by Bernard Goumou on August 20, 2022 and 19 February 2024.

On March 6, 2026, she was appointed advisor in charge of sanitation and the environment at the presidency of the Republic of Guinea.

== Biography ==
=== Career ===
Before becoming a minister, she was the director of internal control at Total Guinée. She is appointed by decree on October 25, 2021 as Minister of Fisheries, Aquaculture and Maritime Economy, replacing Frédéric Loua.

On February 19, 2024, the Bernard Goumou government was dissolved by the National Committee of Reconciliation and Development (CNRD). On March 13, 2024, she became the Minister for the Promotion of Women, Children and Vulnerable Persons in the First Oury government until January 22, 2026.

On March 6, 2026, she was appointed advisor in charge of sanitation and the environment at the presidency of the Republic of Guinea.
