= Guillaume Hawing =

Guinean politician, teacher, and inventor

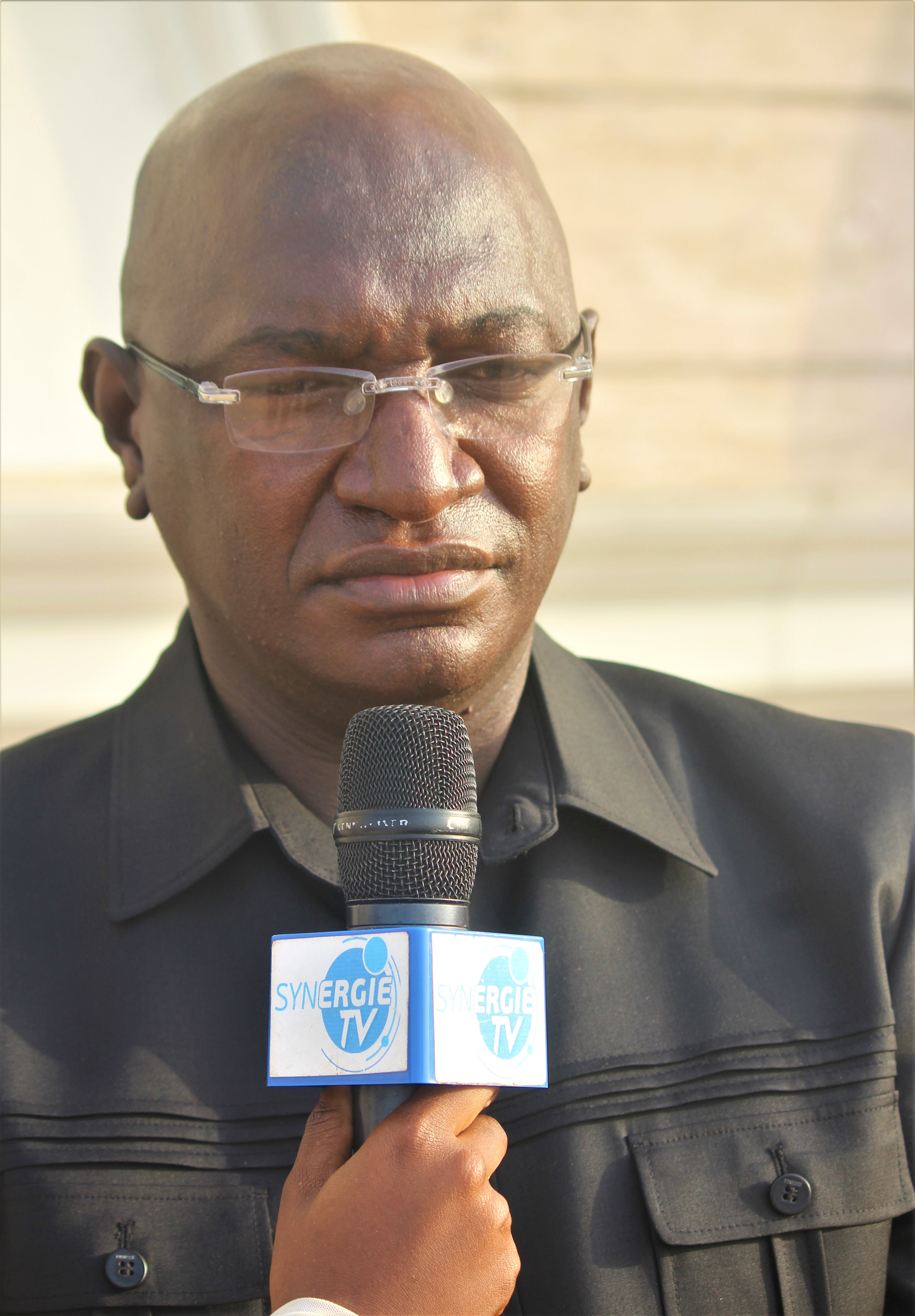

Minister of Pre-University Education and Literacy
- In office 27 October 2021 – 19 February 2024
- Preceded by: Bano Barry
- Succeeded by: TBD

Guillaume Hawing is a Guinean teacher, inventor and politician.

He served as the Minister of Pre-University Education and Literacy in the government led by Mohamed Béavogui from 27 October 2021, and later in the Bernard Goumou government from 20 August 2022 to 19 February 2024.

== Biography ==
=== Professional career ===
Before becoming a minister, he was the Director-General of the Mahatma Gandhi Private Institute in Lambanyi.

He was appointed by decree, on 27 October 2021, as the Minister of Pre-University Education and Literacy in the government, replacing Professor Bano Barry.

On 19 February 2024, the Bernard Goumou government, of which he was a member, was dissolved by the National Committee of Reconciliation and Development (CNRD).

== Guillaume Hawing's Algorithm ==
In February 2016, he published an invention in mathematical algorithms that generates, organizes and sequences prime numbers.

== Publications ==
- 2019: Dieu se moque-t-il de notre intelligence?

== Awards and recognition ==
- 2019: Two gold medals and a grand prize for science and innovation at the International Innovation Week in Africa (IWA 2019) in Rabat (Morocco).
