= Faya Millimono =

Guinean politician

Faya Millimouno
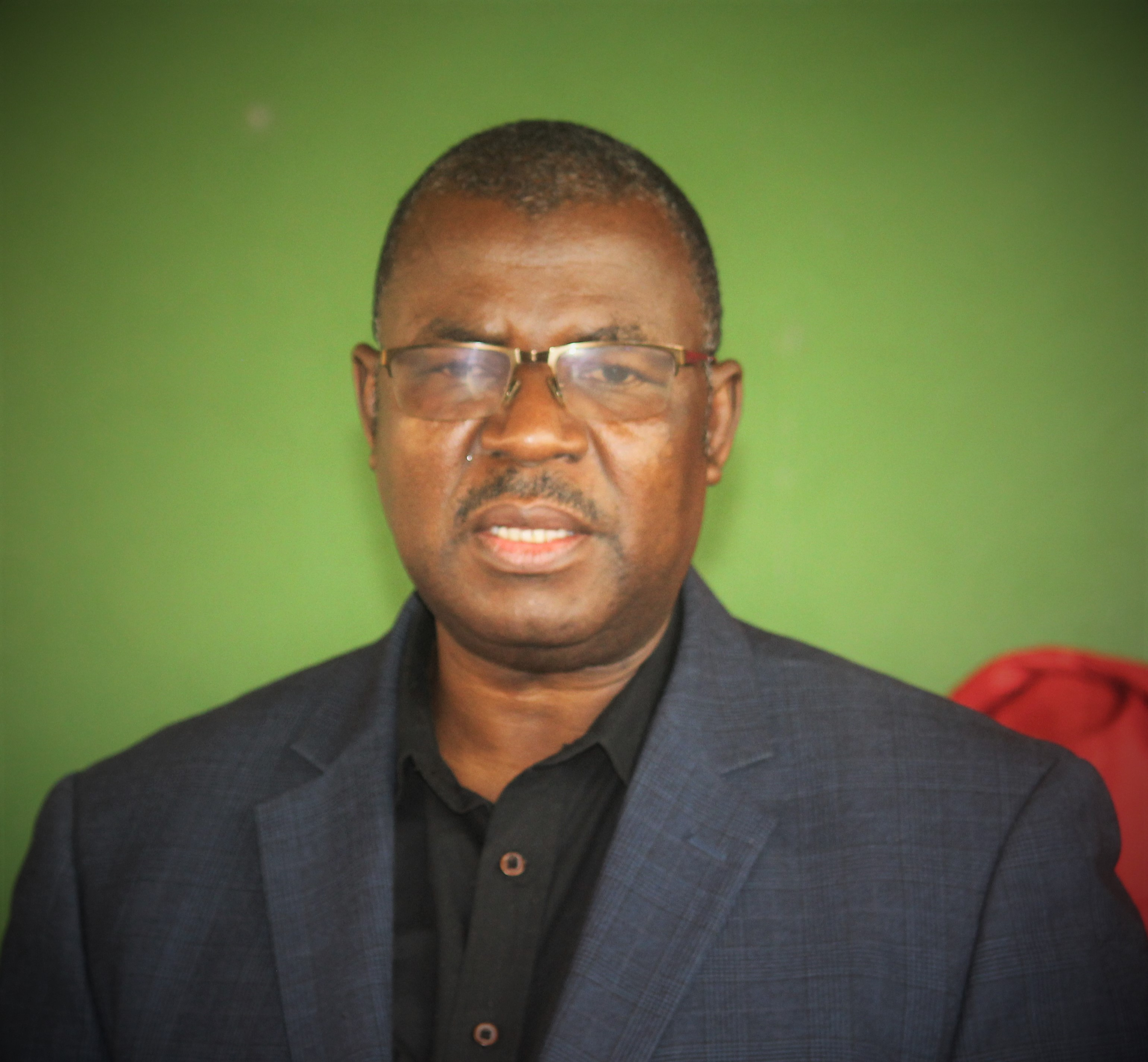
- Faya Millimono in 2020

President of the Liberal Bloc
- Incumbent
- Assumed office 2013
- Preceded by: Office established

Personal details
- Born: 25 November 1962 (age 63) Kolifa, Ouéndé-Kénéma, Guinea
- Party: Liberal Bloc

Dr. Faya Lansana Millimouno (born 25 November 1962) is a Guinean teacher and politician who has served as president of the Liberal Bloc since its establishment in 2013. He was a major opposition candidate in the 2025 Guinean presidential election.

== Early life ==
Faya Millimouno was born on 25 November 1962 in Kolifa, in the constituency of Ouendé, Guéckédou, in Forest Guinea. His father and mother were named Sory Saa Toh and Finda Sitta Kamano, respectively.

== Career ==
Millimouno qualified as a 'teacher-researcher' at the Ecole Normale Supérieure de Manéah (now known as the Higher Institute of Educational Sciences of Guinea) in 1987. In 1993, he received the Francophonie Excellence Scholarship from the Canadian government. He was thus enrolled at the University of Montreal, where he obtained a Master's degree and a Doctorate (PhD) in Educational Administration.

Millimouno went on to work as an educational consultant at the World Bank, and as a pension manager at Georgetown University in the United States. In 2013, he was working for the "National League" as a database manager for American cities.

== Politics ==
Millimouno began his political career in 1991 as part of the Guinean Progress Party (PGP) of Abdoulaye Portos Diallo. After a break from politics, he returned in 2008 as a member of the opposition New Generation for the Republic (NGR) party. In 2013, he founded the Liberal Bloc and has served as its president since its establishment.

A long-time critic of president Alpha Condé; Millimouno was initially supportive of the National Committee of Reconciliation and Development (the military junta which took power in the 2021 Guinean coup d'état). However, he has since become more critical of their handling of the transition. He was the presidential candidate of the Liberal Bloc in the 2025 Guinean presidential election.

== Personal life ==
Millimouno is married to Koumba Koundouno. The couple has five children; three girls and two boys (Saa and Tamba).
