= 2025 Guinean presidential election =

- 28 December 2025
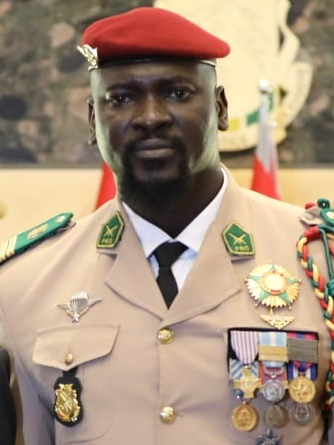

Nominee	Mamady Doumbouya	Abdoulaye Yéro Baldé
Party	GMD	FRONDEG
Popular vote	4,594,262	349,129
Percentage	86.72%	6.59%
President before election
Mamady Doumbouya
Military
Elected President
Mamady Doumbouya
GMD

Presidential elections were held in Guinea on 28 December 2025. They are the first to be held in the country since the 2021 Guinean coup d'état that installed general Mamady Doumbouya as president. Doumbouya won by a landslide margin amid criticism by opposition groups and the United Nations over the conduct of the election.

== Background ==
The election month was announced by Prime Minister Bah Oury at the Africa CEO Forum in Abidjan, Ivory Coast on 12 May 2025. In June 2025, the ruling military junta established the Directorate General of Elections (DGE) to oversee the election. The election was scheduled for 28 December 2025 by a decree read by Doumbouya on national television on 27 September 2025.

== Electoral system ==
Candidates were required to submit a deposit of 875 million Guinean francs ($100,000). Candidates were also required to be residing in Guinea and aged between 40 and 80 years. A runoff election is required should no candidate win a majority.

== Candidates ==
A total of 11 people submitted their candidacies before the Supreme Court by the deadline of candidate registration on 3 November 2025. These included:

- Mamady Doumbouya, incumbent president.
- Lansana Kouyaté, former prime minister.
- Ousmane Kaba, former minister.
- Amadou Thierno Diallo, former minister.
- Ben Youssouf Keita, member of the national assembly.

On 8 November, the Supreme Court released a provisional list of nine candidates which included Doumbouya and Yero Baldé from the Democratic Front of Guinea but excluded Kouyaté and Kaba.

== Conduct ==
Doumbouya's campaign highlighted major infrastructure projects and reforms launched under his rule, while Yero Baldé ran on themes of anti-corruption and economic growth.

Nearly 12,000 police officers were mobilized to provide security during the election. A day before the vote, authorities said that security forces "neutralised" an armed group with "subversive intentions threatening national security" after gunshots were reported in the Sonfonia neighborhood of Conakry.

Several opposition groups called for a boycott of the election, with exiled opposition leader Cellou Dalein Diallo calling the vote "an electoral charade" aimed at giving legitimacy to "the planned confiscation of power". United Nations rights commissioner Volker Turk said the campaign was marred by severe restrictions, "intimidation of opposition actors, apparently politically motivated enforced disappearances, and constraints on media freedom" that threatened to undermine the credibility of the election.

Following the election, opposition candidate Faya Millimono said the vote was marred by "systematic fraudulent practices" and restrictions on observers monitoring the voting and counting processes. Another candidate, Yero Balde, alleged that ballot stuffing had taken place and that his representatives were prevented from accessing vote-counting centres. The National Front for the Defence of the Constitution also said that a "huge majority of Guineans chose to boycott the electoral charade". Balde subsequently filed a petition before the Supreme Court accusing the DGE of electoral fraud, but withdrew the complaint on 3 January 2026.

== Results ==
The DGE declared Mamady Doumbouya as the winner on 30 December, having won 86.72% of the vote, followed by Yéro Baldé with 6.59%. The results were validated by the Supreme Court on 4 January 2026.

Candidate	Party	Votes	%
Mamady Doumbouya	Independent	4,594,262	86.72
Abdoulaye Yéro Baldé	Democratic Front of Guinea	349,129	6.59
Faya Millimono	Liberal Bloc	108,177	2.04
Makalé Camara	Front for the National Alliance	84,175	1.59
Ibrahima Abé Sylla	New Generation for Building the Republic	46,261	0.87
Mohamed Nabé	Alliance for Renewal and Progress	44,102	0.83
Abdoulaye Kourouma	Rally for Resistance and Development	29,529	0.56
Bouna Keita	Rally for a Prosperous Guinea	27,529	0.52
Mohamed Sherif Tounkara	Independent	14,767	0.28
Total		5,297,931	100.00
Valid votes		5,297,931	94.46
Invalid/blank votes		310,589	5.54
Total votes		5,608,520	100.00
Registered voters/turnout		6,768,458	82.86
Source: Direction Générale des Élections

== Aftermath ==
Doumbouya was inaugurated as the civilian president of Guinea on 17 January 2026. On 23 January, the African Union lifted sanctions imposed on Guinea following the 2021 Guinean coup d'état, citing the transition to civilian rule under the 2025 election. ECOWAS also lifted sanctions and reinstated Guinea's membership on 30 January 2026.
