= Mariama Sylla (politician) =

Guinean politician

Minister of Social Action, Women's Empowerment and Childhood
- In office 26 May 2018 – 27 January 2021
- President: Alpha Condé
- Prime Minister: Ibrahima Kassory Fofana
- Preceded by: Sanaba Kaba
- Succeeded by: Aissata Daffé

Personal details
- Party: Rally of the Guinean People
- Occupation: politician

Mariama Sylla is a Guinean politician from the Rally of the Guinean People. She was appointed the Minister of Social Action, Women's Empowerment and Childhood by presidential decree on 26 May 2018.
