= Aissata Daffé =

Guinean politician (born 1956)

Minister of Social Action, Women's Empowerment and Childhood
- In office 27 January 2021 – 5 September 2021
- Preceded by: Mariama Sylla
- Succeeded by: Aicha Nanette Conté

Personal details
- Born: Aissata Daffé Samoura; 24 September 1956 (age 70) Conakry, Guinea
- Education: Humboldt University of Berlin

Aissata Daffé Samoura LL-Q150 (fra)-M Conte2003-Aissata Daffé.wav (born 24 September 1956) is a Guinean politician .

Previously a member of the National Assembly, she was also Deputy Director General of the National Agency for Economic and Social Inclusion of the Republic of Guinea.

In 2021, she served as the Minister of Social Action and Childhood in the Second Kassory government.

== Biography ==
=== Studies ===
After graduating from high school, Aissata Daffé pursued higher education at IPGAN in Conakry and obtained a scholarship to study in Germany.

Between 1977 and 1982, she studied industrial chemical engineering at Humboldt University in Berlin, where she was an assistant in the food chemistry department.

She also studied at the Herder Institute for Languages in Leipzig.

Since 2007, she has been a member of the thesis defense jury in industrial chemistry at the Gamal-Abdel-Nasser University of Conakry and since 2010, docent at several universities and higher institutes in Guinea.

=== Professional career ===
In 1987, she was responsible for research and quality at the Guinean brewery company (SOBRAGUI SA).

=== Political career ===
Aissata Daffé has been a member of the board of directors of the Framework for Consultation of Girls and Women of Political Parties of Guinea since 2009.

From 2009 to 2010, she was the vice-president of the Women's Coordination Committee of the Civil Society; from 2011 to 2013, she was the spokesperson for the Consultation Framework of girls and women of political parties in Guinea.

A member of the National Assembly of Guinea from 2016 to 2020, she was vice-president of the ECOWAS network of women parliamentarians until 2019.

She participated in the parliamentary conference on the WTO in Argentina in 2017 and then in the 61st session of the United Nations women's conference in 2018.

From 2014 to 2020, Aissata Daffé was a member of the ECOWAS Parliament.

==== Minister ====
In 2021, she was the Minister of Social Action and Childhood in the Second Kassory government, under the presidency of Alpha Condé.
