= Diakaria Koulibaly =

Guinean politician

Director General of the National Petroleum Office
- In office 2016–2018
- President: Alpha Condé
- Prime Minister: Ibrahima Kassory Fofana

Minister of Energy, Hydropower and Hydrocarbons
- In office 2018–2021
- President: Alpha Condé
- Prime Minister: Ibrahima Kassory Fofana
- Preceded by: position created
- Succeeded by: Ibrahima Abé Sylla

Personal details
- Born: 12 November 1976 Mandiana, Republic of Guinea
- Party: Rally of the Guinean People
- Education: Gamal Abdel Nasser University of Conakry

Diakaria Koulibaly is a Guinean politician. He is a former Minister of Hydrocarbons appointed May 26, 2018.

== Biography and education ==
Born in Mandiana, he studied in Guinea, receiving a master's degree in finance in 1998 from Gamal Abdel Nasser University of Conakry.

== Professional career ==
Diakaria Koulibaly held several positions in the Guinean administration, notably in the petroleum sector.

From June 1999 to September 2001, he was management controller at Société Guinéenne d’Électricité (SOGEL), (currently) Électricité de Guinée (EDG), from October 2001 to September 2006 he was General accounting manager. from 2006 to January 2011 he was management controller at Total Guinée, a subsidiary of the French petroleum firm Total.

From March 2014 to June 2014, he was an advisor at the Ministry of Trade (Guinea) tasked with the petroleum sector, and then Director General of the Office National des Pétroles (ONAP).

From July 2014 to December 2015, he was the National Director of Petroleum Products and Derivatives at the Ministry of Trade and from January 2016 to 29 August 2018 General Director of the l’Office National des Pétroles (ONAP).

He was Minister of Energy, Hydropower and Hydrocarbons, appointed 26 May 2018.

== Arrest ==
Diakaria Koulibaly was imprisoned at the Maison Centrale de Conakry on April 6, 2022, after three days of interrogation by the court for the repression of economic and financial crime, who pursued him for alleged illegal gains and laundering of Federal funds.

April 20, 2022, he was released from prison under control of the judiciary while awaiting trial.
