= Béavogui/Goumou government =

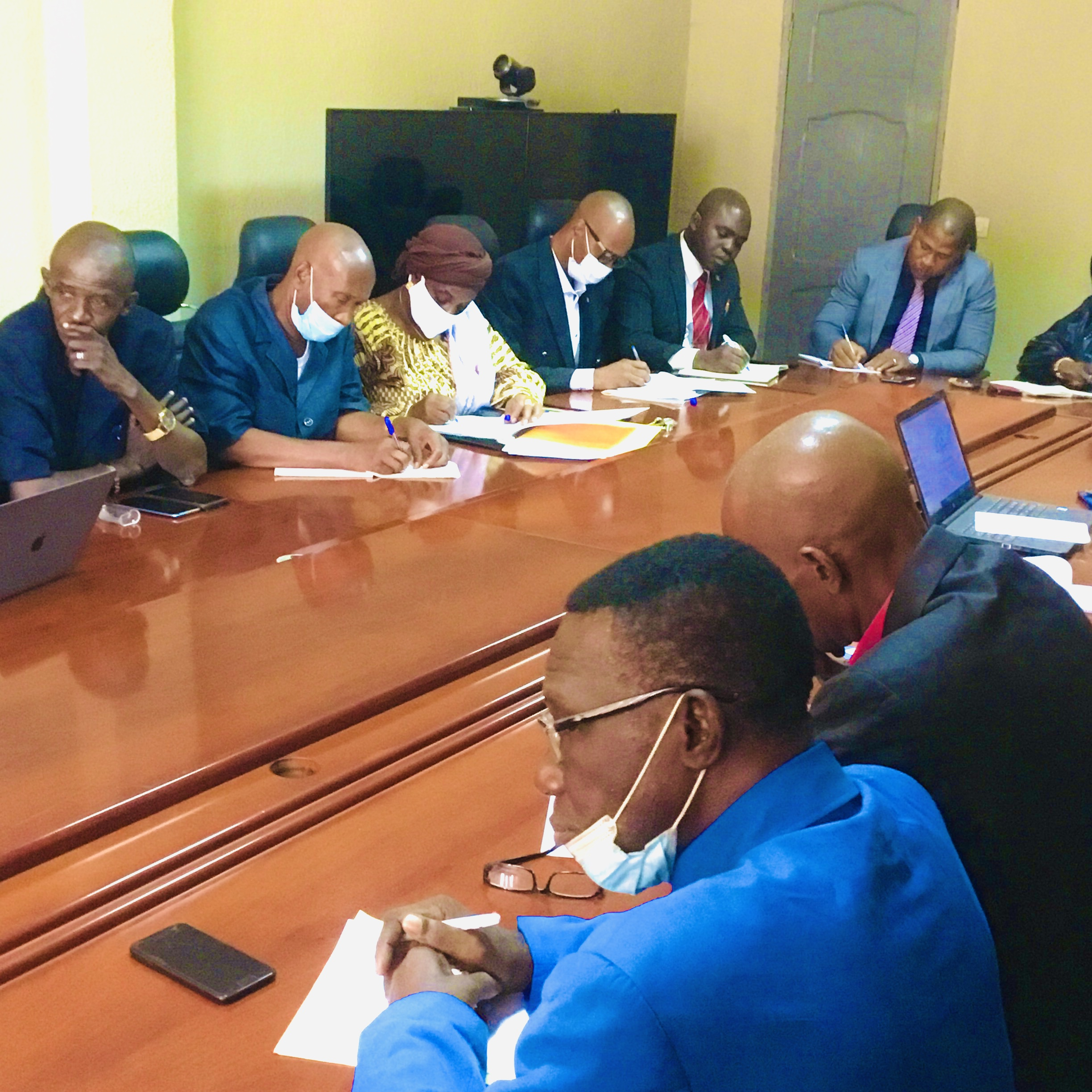
The cabinet meeting in 2022.

The Béavogui government was a formation of the Cabinet of Guinea that held power between October 2021 and February 2024, during the period of military rule by the CNRD. It was formed on 27 October 2021 by Prime Minister of Guinea Mohamed Béavogui.

On 16 July 2022, Bernard Goumou took over as prime minister. The government cited Béavogui's health as the reason for this shift.

The ruling junta dissolved the Béavogui/Goumou cabinet on 19 February 2024 without providing a reason for the dissolution. On 27 February 2024, Bah Oury took over as prime minister.

== Ministers ==
- Aboubacar Sidiki Camara - Minister of Defence
- Mamadou Pathé Diallo - Minister for Public Health
- Diaka Sidibé - Minister of Higher Education, Scientific Research and Innovation
