= Sidiba Koulibaly =

Guinean military officer, diplomat, and politician (died 2024)

Chargé d'affaires of the Embassy of Guinea in Cuba
- In office October 2023 – June 2024

Minister of Urban Affairs, Housing and Spatial Planning
- In office 9 May 2023 – 10 May 2023
- Preceded by: Ibrahima Sory Bangoura
- Succeeded by: Ibrahima Kalil Condé

Chief of Staff of the Republic of Guinea Armed Forces
- In office 12 October 2021 – 9 May 2023
- Preceded by: Namory Traoré
- Succeeded by: Ibrahima Sory Bangoura

Personal details
- Died: 22 June 2024 Conakry, Guinea
- Occupation: Military officer Diplomat

Sidiba Koulibaly (died 22 June 2024) was a Guinean military officer, diplomat, and politician.

He served as Chief of Staff of the Republic of Guinea Armed Forces from 12 October 2021 to 9 May 2023. On 15 June 2024, he was arrested and sentenced to five years in prison for desertion and illegal possession of a weapon by a military tribunal in Conakry.

== Biography ==
Koulibaly was second in command during the National Committee of Reconciliation and Development-led 2021 Guinean coup d'état. On 29 September 2021, he headed a delegation which met with Nana Akufo-Addo, president of ECOWAS, following Guinea's suspension from the community. From 12 October 2021 to 9 May 2023, he was Chief of Staff of the Armed Forces, succeeding General Namory Traoré. He was replaced by Ibrahima Sory Bangoura. He replaced the latter as Minister of Urban Affairs, Housing and Spatial Planning for one day, but was replaced by Ibrahima Kalil Condé, former governor of Kindia Region. In October 2023, he was named as Chargé d'affaires of the Embassy of Guinea in Cuba, a position he held until his arrest on 4 June 2024.

It was reported that staff at the Guinean embassy in Havana had not received their salary in five months. He was sentenced to five years in prison by the Conakry military court. The day after his conviction, he was removed from the Guinean Armed Forces and demoted to the rank of colonel.

Koulibaly died of cardiac arrest in Conakry on 22 June 2024.

== Awards ==
- Grand Officer of the National Order of Merit (2022)
