= Ministry of Women, Family and Solidarity =

Republic of Guinea government ministry

Minister of Women, Family and Solidarity of Guinea
- Ministère de la Femme, de la Famille et des Solidarités
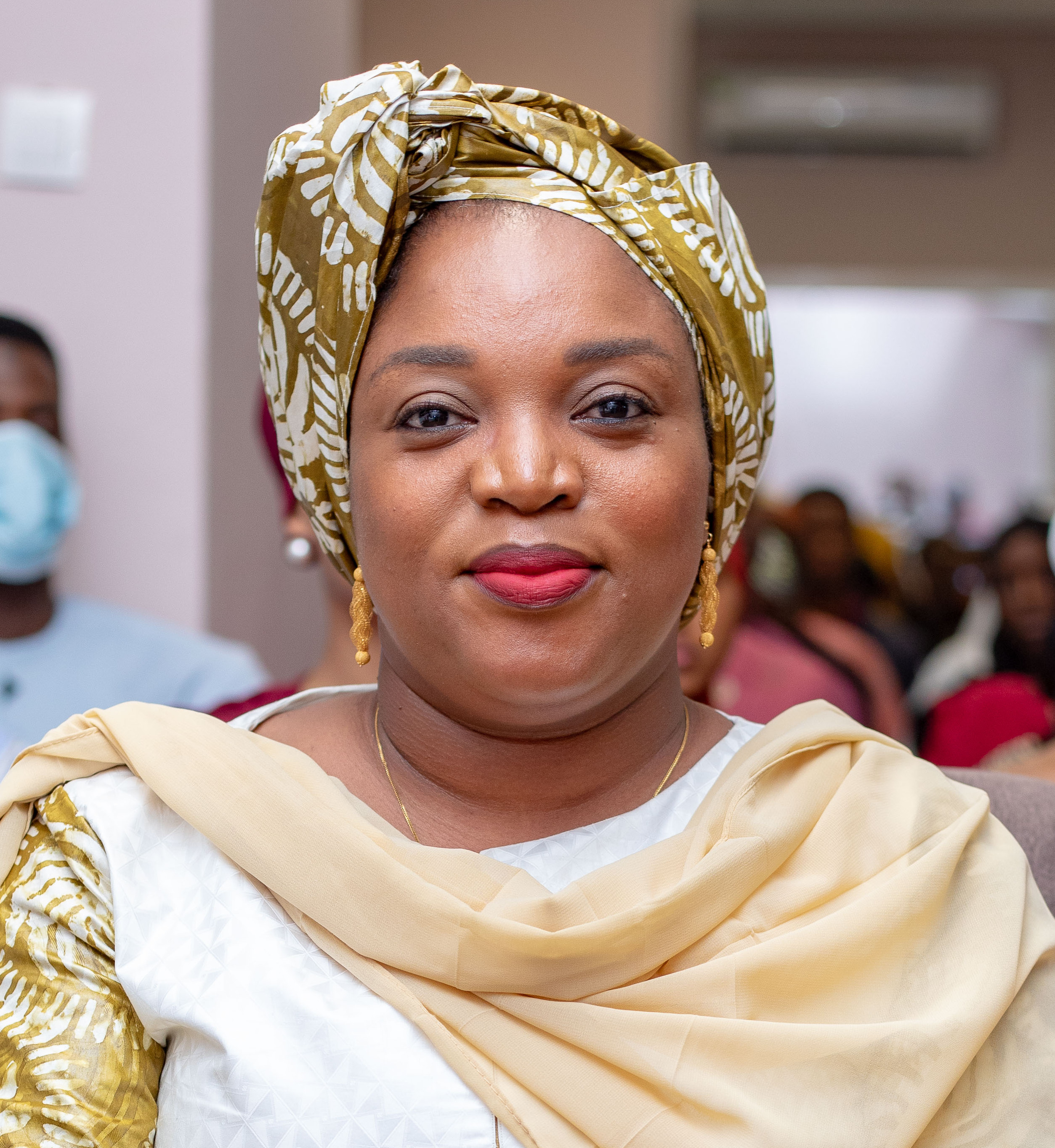
- Incumbent; Patricia Lamah since 2 February 2026
- Type: Ministry
- Reports to: President of Guinea
- Seat: Kaloum
- Website: https://mpfe.gov.gn/

The Ministry of Women, Family and Solidarity (French: Ministère de la Femme, de la Famille et des Solidarités) is a Guinean ministry whose current minister is Patricia Lamah.

== Ministers ==
Name	Dates of the term		Government(s)
Hadja Tété Nabé	28 March 2007	20 May 2008	Kouyaté
Germaine Mangué	20 May 2008	24 December 2008	Souaré
Hadja Makoura Sylla	14 January 2009	26 January 2010	Komara
Nanfadima Magassouba	15 February 2010	24 December 2010	Doré
Nanténin Chérif	24 December 2010	6 October 2012	Saïd Fofana I
Hadja Diaka Diakité	6 October 2012	15 January 2014	Saïd Fofana I
Sanaba Kaba	20 January 2014	17 May 2018	Saïd Fofana II and Youla
Mariama Sylla	26 May 2018	28 January 2021	Kassory I
Aissata Daffé	28 January 2021	5 September 2021	Kassory II
Aicha Nanette Conté	26 October 2021	19 February 2024	Béavogui/Goumou government
Charlotte Daffé	13 March 2024	22 January 2026	Bah Oury I
Patricia Lamah	2 February 2026	Incumbent	Bah Oury II
In the interval between two terms, the outgoing minister manages day-to-day affairs. Successive titles: 2007-2008: Social Affairs, Women's Status and Childhood; 2008-2010: Women's Empowerment and Childhood; 2010: National Solidarity, Women's Empowerment and Childhood; 2010-2014: Social Affairs, Women's Empowerment and Childhood; 2014-2021: Social Action, Women's Empowerment and Childhood; 2021-2026: Women's Empowerment, Childhood and Vulnerable Persons; Since 2026: Women, Family and Solidarity

== See also ==
- Politics of Guinea
