= Édouard Niankoye Lamah =

Guinean politician (1945 or 1946 – 2025)

Minister of State (Guinea) Minister for Public Health (Guinea)
- In office 26 May 2018 – 11 November 2019
- President: Alpha Condé
- Prime Minister: Ibrahima Kassory Fofana
- Preceded by: Abdourahamane Diallo
- Succeeded by: Remy Lamah

Foreign Minister (Guinea) Minister of Foreign Affairs and Guineans abroad
- In office 24 December 2010 – 6 October 2012
- President: Alpha Condé
- Prime Minister: Mohamed Said Fofana
- Preceded by: Lucien Bendou Guilao
- Succeeded by: François Lonseny Fall

Personal details
- Born: 1945 or 1946
- Died: 18 March 2025 (aged 79)

Édouard Niankoye Lamah (1945 or 1946 – 18 March 2025) was a Guinean politician who served as Foreign Minister, then Minister for Public Health.

== Life and career ==
Lamah was Foreign Minister before being replaced by François Lonseny Fall.

He was named Minister of Health on 26 May 2018, replacing Abdourahamane Diallo in the first Kassory government, before being replaced by Remy Lamah in November 2019.

Lamah died on 18 March 2025, at the age of 79.

Political offices
Preceded by Abdourahamane Diallo	Minister of Health of Guinea; 2018-2019	Succeeded by Remy Lamah
Preceded by Bakary Fofana	Foreign Minister of Guinea; 2010-2012	Succeeded by François Lonseny Fall
