= National Coalition of Guinea for the Rights and Citizenship of Women =

Women's-rights group in Africa

The National Coalition of Guinea for the Rights and Citizenship of Women (CONAG-DCF) (Coalition nationale de Guinée pour les droits et la citoyenneté des femmes) is a women's rights group in Guinea. CONAG-DCF is a coalition of NGOs and unions of teachers and researchers from across Guinea. It documents violence against women, helps women in prison, and raises awareness of early marriage and others issues relating to girls' rights.

In May 2005 CONAG reported the widespread practice of forced or arranged marriage in Guinea. After the 2009 Guinea protest, CONAG-DCF issued a declaration on the rights and citizenship of Guinea's women.

Nanfadima Magassouba is a former president of CONAG-DCF. Since February 2017 the coalition's president has been Binta Nabé.
