= Diaka Sidibé =

Guinean politician

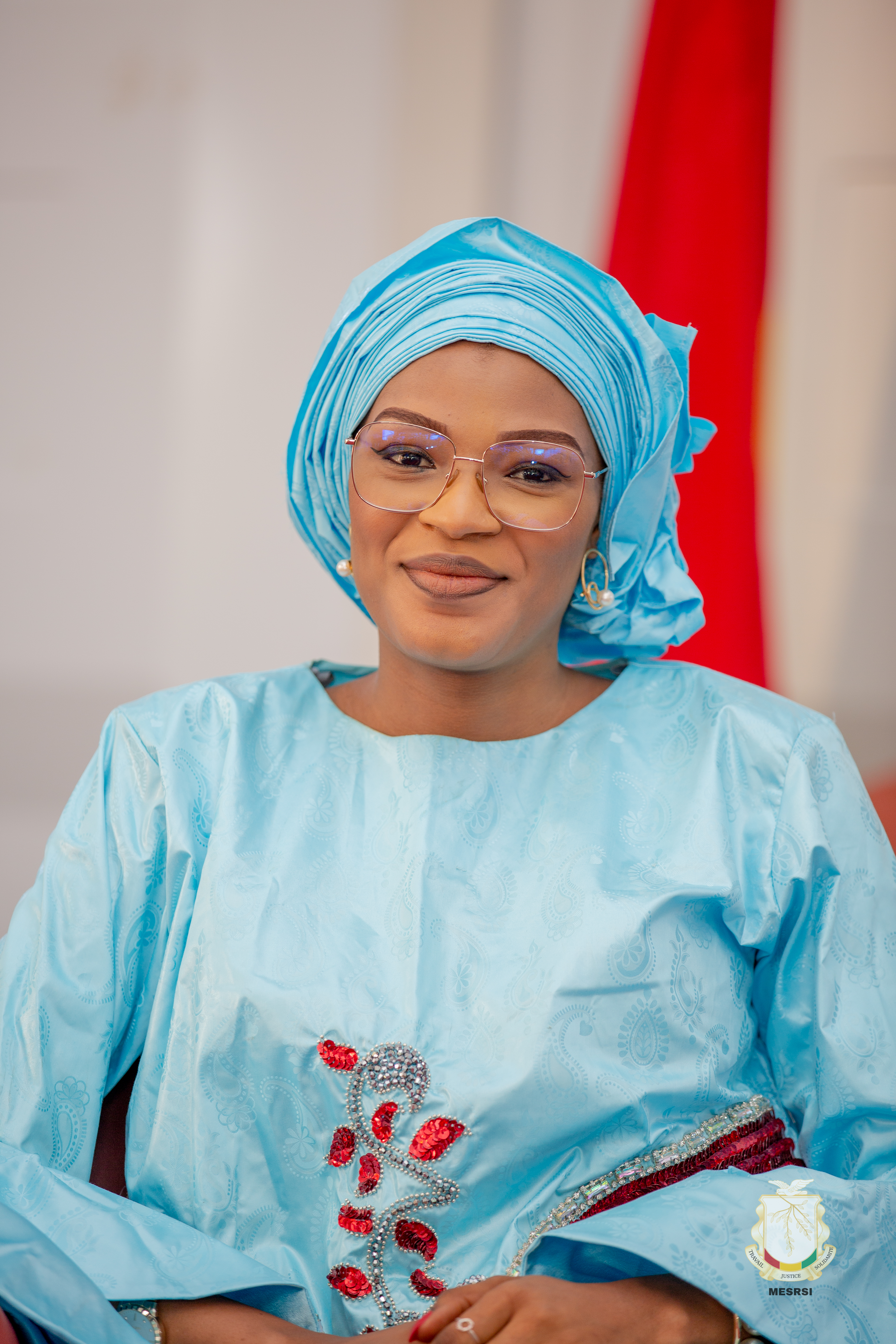

Minister of Higher Education, Scientific Research and Innovation
- Incumbent
- Assumed office 26 October 2021
- President: Mamady Doumbouya

Diaka Sidibé is a Guinean politician. She is the Minister of Higher Education, Scientific Research and Innovation in the government led by Mohamed Béavogui from 26 October 2021, then that of Bernard Goumou since 20 August 2022.

== See also ==
- List of Fula people
