= Mohamed Tall =

Guinean politician

Minister of Livestock
- In office 2016–2018
- President: Alpha Condé
- Prime Minister: Ibrahima Kassory Fofana

Mohamed Tall is a Guinean politician. He is a former Minister of Livestock. He is currently the spokesperson for the Union of Republican Forces party.

== See also ==
- Ministry of Agriculture and Livestock (Guinea)
- Ibrahima Kassory Fofana
