= Mariama Cire Sylla =

Guinean businesswoman, bank expert and politician

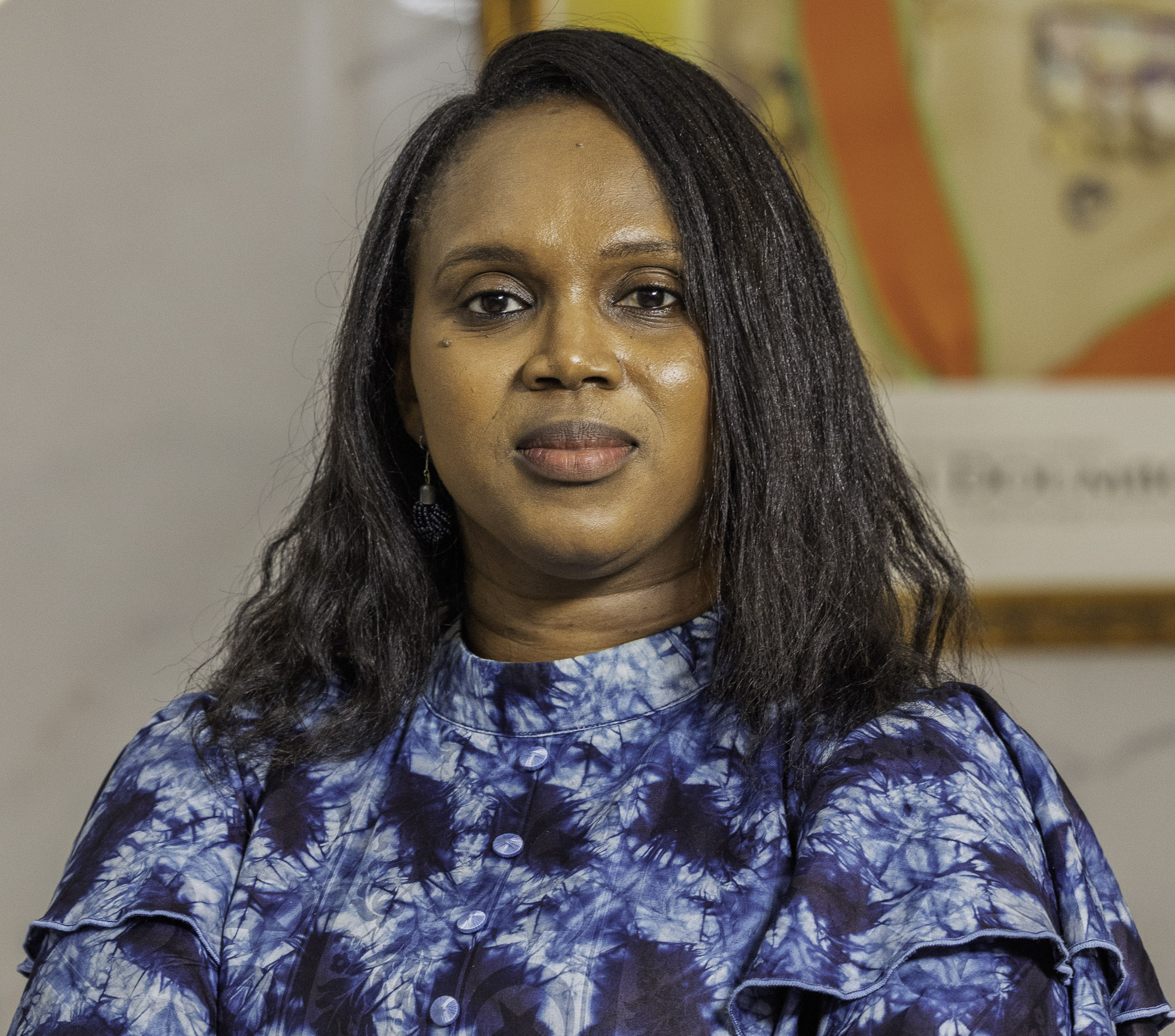
- Mariama Cire Sylla in 2025

Minister of Economy, Finance and Budget
- Incumbent
- Assumed office 2 February 2026
- President: Mamady Doumbouya
- Prime Minister: Bah Oury
- Preceded by: Mourana Soumah

Personal details
- Parent: Aboubacar Sylla (father)
- Education: University of Oxford; Williams College; Paris 1 Panthéon-Sorbonne University

Mariama Cire Sylla is a Guinean businesswoman, bank expert and politician, Minister of Economy, Finance and Budget of Guinea since 2026. She previously served as Minister of Agriculture between 2025 and 2026 and worked for the World Bank Group.

== Education ==
Sylla got a master's degree in public policy from University of Oxford, a master's degree in economic policy from Williams College in the United States, and a master's degree in economics and business administration from the Paris 1 Panthéon-Sorbonne University.

== Career ==
She began her career in the financial sector, working for BRED Banque populaire in France and KPMG in Guinea, and held various commercial management positions at companies such as Maersk Line in Guinea and Safmarine in Belgium.

Sylla joined the World Bank Group in 2014 and led programs to improve the business environment and develop local enterprises, as well as digitization, financing for local businesses and SMEs, reforms to unlock investment in the mining and agri-food sectors, support for women and young entrepreneurs in sub-Saharan Africa, and business development in the Middle East. She also oversaw World Bank and International Finance Corporation operations in Guinea and West Africa. She later served as the World Bank Group's resident representative in Namibia.

She also worked for the IFC as a representative in Burundi, for Fragile and Conflict-Affected States in the Sahel and West Africa regions, and as a member of the IFC's market creation advisory team.

On 29 July 2025 she was named Minister of Agriculture, succeeding Felix Lamah. In October 2025 participated in the World Bank's strategic meeting on the revival and modernisation of the agricultural sector in Guinea.

On 2 February 2026 Sylla was appointed Minister of Economy, Finance and Budget, succeeding Mourana Soumah.

== Publications ==
- Better Led, Served and Governed World – Envisioning the Future (co-author, 2014)
