= Khaité Sall =

Guinean politician

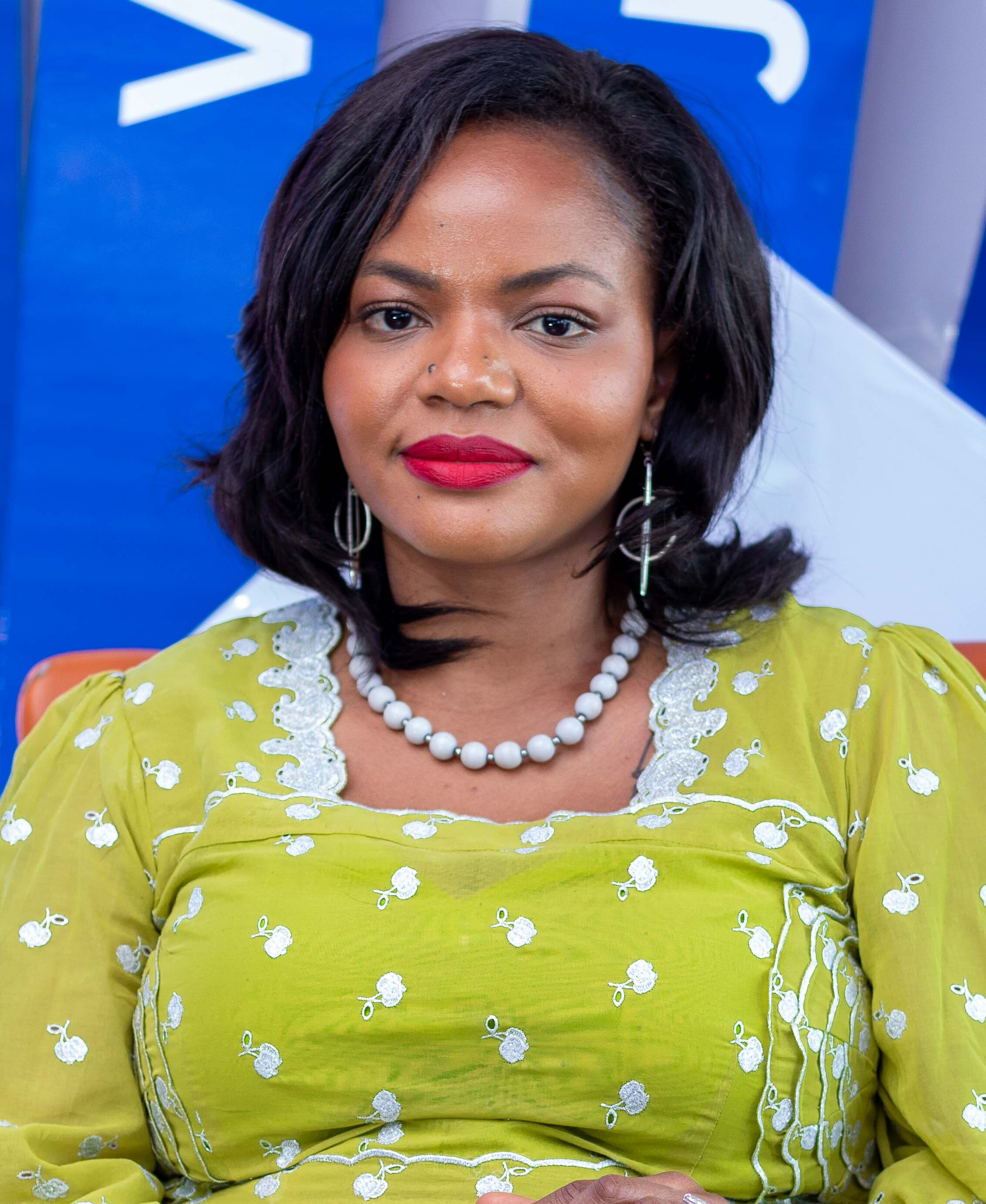
- Khaité Sall in 2026

Minister of Health and Sanitation
- Incumbent
- Assumed office 2 February 2026
- Appointed by: Mamadi Doumbouya
- Preceded by: Oumar Diouhé Bah

Secretary General of the Ministry of Youth
- In office 13 October 2025 – 2 February 2026
- Appointed by: Mamadi Doumbouya
- Preceding: Mohamed Lamine Yansané
- Succeeded by: Cellou Baldé

Secretary General of the Ministry of Health and Sanitation
- In office 12 December 2023 – 13 October 2025
- Appointed by: Mamadi Doumbouya

Chief of Cabinet of the Ministry of Health
- In office November 2021 – December 2023
- Website: https://sante.gov.gn/

Khaité Sall is a Guinean politician and current Minister of Health and Sanitation.

== Life and career ==
Khaité Sall was the daughter of former President of the Guinean Supreme Court Kéléfa Sall. She graduated from Long Island University. Before her political career, she worked as director of community health at Federation of Organizations, a social work organization in New York.

She entered her political career after the September 2021 coup d'état, when she was nominated as chief of cabinet of the Ministry of Health and Sanitation. As chief of cabinet, she focused on responding to the COVID-19 pandemic as well as maternal and infant health. In December 2023, she replaced Mohamed Lamine Yansané as secretary general of the Ministry of Health, the second highest position in the ministry. As the secretary general, she focused on universal sanitation, modernizing and digitizing hospital infrastructure, and reinforcing epidemic response. In 2025, she became the secretary general of the Ministry of Youth. She stayed in the position until February 2026, when she was nominated as the minister of the Ministry of Health and Sanitation. Her stated mission at the Ministry is to develop and implement more legislation for public health.
