= Patricia Lamah =

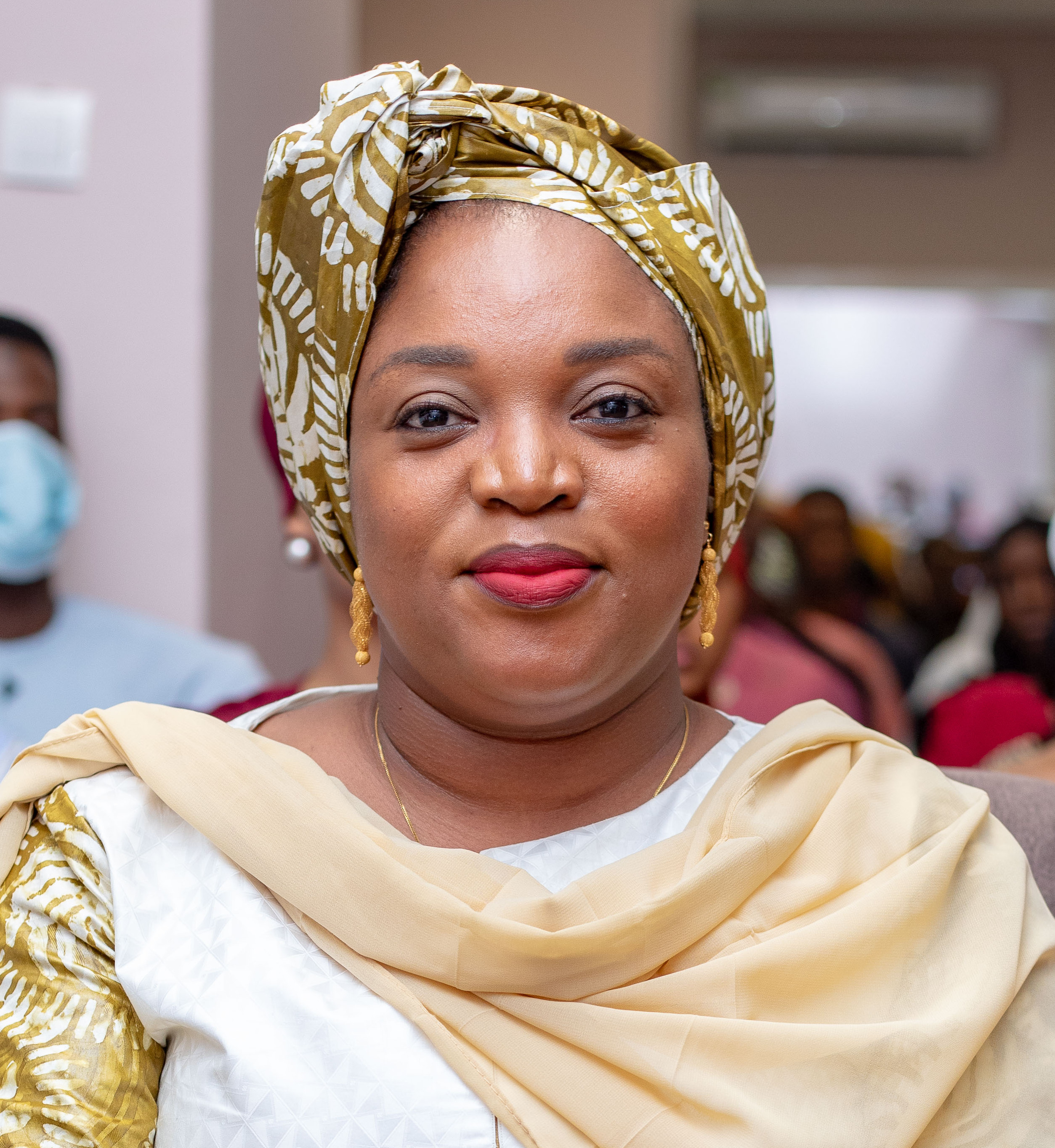
- Patricia Lamah in 2026

Minister for Women, Family and Solidarity
- Incumbent
- Assumed office 2 February 2026
- Preceded by: Charlotte Daffé

Personal details
- Born: Pauline Adeline Patricia Lamah; 1987 (age 38–39) Guinea
- Occupation: Hairdresser, entrepreneur, politician

Pauline Adeline Patricia Lamah, known as Patricia Lamah (born 1987), is a Guinean hairdresser, entrepreneur and politician.

From 2 February 2026 to 29 July 2026, she served as Minister for Women, Family and Solidarity of Guinea. Since 30 July 2026, she has served as Presidential Adviser on Women, Family and Solidarity Issues to the President of Guinea.

In 2018, she achieved first place at the third edition of the Koiffure Kitoko hairdressing competition in Ivory Coast.

== Biography ==
=== Early life and education ===
Orphaned at a young age, she was raised by her grandmother in Conakry where she attended primary and secondary school in the Madina-cité neighborhood. In 2003, she entered the Sainte Marie high school in Conakry where she obtained her baccalaureate in 2006.

She was directed to the Université Général Lansana Conté where she obtained a master's degree in private law in 2010.

== Professional career ==
After university, she first became an administrative and financial assistant in a company in Guinea, then she joined UBA bank from 2011 to 2013.

From 2013 to 2018, she held the position of legal and litigation manager at BCI Guinea bank.

At the same time, passionate about hairdressing, she created her hairdressing company in 2017, Pat's Natural Beauty in Conakry and then in Kamsar, which specializes in nappy hairstyles.

=== Minister ===
On 2 February 2026, Patricia Lamah was appointed Minister for Women, Family and Solidarity of the Republic of Guinea by President Mamady Doumbouya.

=== Personal life ===
Lamah is married and the mother of two daughters..

== Awards and recognitions ==
- 2018: Kitoko Hairdressing Award

== See also ==
- Hadja Idrissa Bah
- Aminata Pilimini Diallo
- Kadija Bah
- Edith Delight
