= Mariama Camara =

Guinean politician (1958 or 1959 – 2025)

Minister of Agriculture
- In office 2017–2021
- President: Alpha Condé
- Prime Minister: Ibrahima Kassory Fofana
- Preceded by: Jacqueline Marthe Sultan
- Succeeded by: Roger Patrick Millimono

Minister of Trade
- In office 2021–2021
- President: Alpha Condé
- Prime Minister: Ibrahima Kassory Fofana
- Preceded by: Boubacar Barry
- Succeeded by: Bernard Goumou

Personal details
- Born: 1958 or 1959
- Died: 13 January 2025 (aged 66) Morocco
- Party: Rally of the Guinean People
- Education: Gamal Abdel Nasser University of Conakry

Mariama Camara (1958 or 1959 – 13 January 2025) was a Guinean politician and businesswoman. She was a former Minister of Agriculture, and Minister of Trade.

== Professional career ==
With a degree in Food chemistry from Gamal Abdel Nasser University of Conakry (IPGAN), Mariama Camara began her career at la Société nationale de brasserie and at the Ministère du Développement rural de Guinée in 1991, then joining the Société guinéenne de palmier à huile et d'hévéa (SOGUIPAH) at its creation. In 1993, she was appointed joint director general, and then director general of SOGUIPAH for 24 years.

Mariama Camara participated, in the Guinean governmental team, on the mobilisation of funds for agricultural and industrial investment, and accompanying measures with various financial partners (French Development Agency, European Investment Bank, African Development Bank, BADEA...) helped to lead the FAO to mobilise funds to train refugees of the Liberian Civil War in Guinée forestière to farm and fish.

== Minister ==
From 27 December 2017 to 15 January 2021, Mariama Camara was Minister of Agriculture of Guinea, then minister of Trade until the fall of Alpha Condé, 5 September 2021.

On 7 July 2023, she was convicted in absentia of destruction of private buildings and abuse of authority.

She was also a member of the National Economic and Social Council of Guinea.

== Death ==
Camara died in Morocco on 13 January 2025, at the age of 66.

== Awards ==
- Recipient of the Medal of Honor of Labor.
