= Herbier National De Guinée =

National herbarium of the Republic of Guinea

Herbier National de Guinée
- Formation: 2009
- Type: Herbarium
- Location: Conakry, Guinea
- Key people: Dr Sékou MAGASSOUBA; Dr. Faya TOUNKARA
- Parent organization: Gamal Abdel Nasser University of Conakry
- Website: http://www.herbierguinee.org

The Herbier National De Guinée (Index Herbariorum Code HNG) is the national herbarium of the Republic of Guinea. Attached to the Gamal Abdel Nasser University of Conakry it was established in 2009 to house a collection of plant specimens found within the country. Its mission is to research and conserve Guinea's botanical heritage and create a network of regional herbaria and botanical gardens and is responsible for contributing to the implementation of the Government's national research policy in the field of plant knowledge. The number of specimens currently housed is 9800 plant and mycological specimens. Since its foundation the HNG has partnered with the Royal Botanic Gardens Kew, a relationship which will continue until at least 2021.

== Projects ==
In 2013 HNG launched a Masters course in Biodiversity and Sustainable Development to address the lack of botanical courses in Guinea.

in 2018 the national herbarium was lead in a project to select a nation flower for Guinea. A nationwide competition was held with citizens voting between critically endangered species. The winning flower, Vernonia djalonensis, now awaiting government approval.

Other recent projects have included repatriation of data from overseas herbaria for use in IUCN Red List assessments for threatened species in Guinea through the BID programme (BID-AF2015-0042-NAC), and identification of threatened habitats and Tropical important Plant Areas financed by the Darwin Initiative (project no: 23-002).
