= Ibrahima Abé Sylla =

Guinean politician (born 1951)

Aboubacar Sylla

Minister of Energy, Hydropower and Hydrocarbons
- Incumbent
- Assumed office November 2021
- President: Mamady Doumbouya
- Prime Minister: Mohamed Béavogui

Personal details
- Born: 1951 (age 74–75) Kindia Prefecture
- Education: University of Maryland, University of Pennsylvania

Aboubacar Sylla is a Guinean Politician. He is the President of the New Generation for the Republic party, and ran for the presidency on that ticket in 2010 and 2020. He is the current Minister of Energy, Hydropower and Hydrocarbons.

== Biography ==
He was born in Kindia Prefecture in 1951. After finishing his primary education in his hometown, he went to Conakry to study at the Lycée Technique de Donka. From 1968 to 1974 he studied in Ivory Coast before travelling to the United States, where he studied at University of Maryland and the University of Pennsylvania. He worked as an engineer at General Electric Power Systems from 1975 to 1983. From 1983 to 1994 he worked at Voice of America. Since 1994 he helped found AIS International incorporated, a company dealing in telecommunications, mining and energy. He worked as a researcher at Bells Laboratories (AT&T), Whippany, New Jersey). He has also been involved in the founding of numerous companies including: SODITEV, GANGAN TV et Radio, the Abé Sylla foundation, and Balla Mining développement SA.

In Politics, he was elected in 2020 as a Deputy in the Chamber of Ministers, Guinea's National Assembly, where he served on the Parliamentary Commission on Management of Territories, Transportation, Energy and Hydropower. He is the president of New Generation for the Republic, an opposition party. In November 2021, following the Coup d'État led by Mamady Doumbouya, he was appointed Minister of Energy, Hydropower and Hydrocarbons.

Preceded by Diakaria Koulibaly	Minister of Energy, Hydropower and Hydrocarbons; 2021-	Succeeded by
