= Bakary Fofana (politician) =

Guinean politician

Bakary Fofana is a former minister for foreign affairs for Guinea. He served from 17 February 2010 to 21 December 2010, under Prime Minister Jean Marie Dore.
