= Mohamed Dorval Doumbouya =

Guinean politician

Deputy in the National Assembly (Guinea), President of the Commission for Environnement, Fisheries, and durable Rural Development
- President: Alpha Conde
- Preceded by: Kadiatou Diallo
- Constituency: Kindia

Personal details
- Party: Rally of the Guinean People

Mohamed Dorval Doumbouya is a Guinean politician who represents the constituency of Kindia, in the National Assembly (Guinea). He is a member of the Majority Rally of the Guinean People Party of former president Alpha Conde.
