= Ministry of Budget (Guinea) =

Government ministry of Guinea

- Ministère du Budget(French)

Ministry overview
- Jurisdiction: Government of Guinea
- Headquarters: Conakry
- Minister responsible: Moussa Cissé, Minister of Budget
- Website: https://mbudget.gov.gn/

The Ministry of Budget (French: ministère du Budget) is a Guinean Ministry tasked with optimizing Guinean budget policy and improving fiscal and customs administration to secure revenue and qualify public spending. The most recent minister is Moussa Cissé.

== Organization ==
The Ministry is headed by the Minister of Budget. The Minister presides over a Cabinet as well as a General Secretariat. Two people, each leading a different component of the Ministry's functioning, are directly responsible to the Minister: the Secretary General (in charge of the Executive branch of the Ministry) and the Chef de Cabinet (responsible for the administrative branch).

The Executive branch contains:National Directorates, General Directorates and Non-central Services, including:

- The National Tax Directorate
- The National Budget Directorate
- The National Directorate of Data Processing Systems
- the National Directorate of Accounting
- The General Directorate of Customs
- The General Directorate of the Office of Strategy and Development
- The Regional Inspectorate of Customs
- The Regional Inspectorate of Taxes
- The Prefectural Section of Customs
- The Prefectural Section of Budget
- The Prefectural Section of Taxes
- The Communal Section of Taxes

The Administrative branch contains:the Cabinet and Auxiliary Services, including:

- The Principal Advisor
- The Advisor charged with Spending Quality
- The Advisor charged with Public Finance Reform & Relations with Technical and Financial partners
- The Advisor charged with Mission
- The Fiscal Advisor
- The Legal Advisor
- The Capacity Building Service
- The Documentary Resource and Archival Service
- The Communication Service
- The Gender and Equity Service
- The Division of Financial Affairs
- The Division of Human Resources
- The General Inspectorate
- The Central Secretariat
- Linked Services

=== Ministers of Budget since 2010 ===
Name	Dates in Office		Government(s)
Mohamed Diaré	24/12/2010	15/01/2014	The Saïd Fofana Government I
Ansoumane Condé	20/01/2014	26/12/2015	The Saïd Fofana Government II
Mohamed Lamine Doumbouya	26/12/2015	17/05/2018	The Youla Government
Ismaël Dioubaté	26/05/2018	05/09/2021	The Kassory GovernmentI;The Kassory Government II
Moussa Cissé	29/10/2021	In Office	Government of Mohamed Béavogui
