= Roger Patrick Millimono =

Guinean politician

Minister of Livestock
- In office 2021–2021
- President: Alpha Condé
- Prime Minister: Ibrahima Kassory Fofana

Minister of Agriculture and Livestock
- In office 2021–2021
- President: Alpha Condé
- Prime Minister: Ibrahima Kassory Fofana

Minister of Environment, Waters and Forests
- In office 2018–2020
- President: Alpha Condé
- Prime Minister: Ibrahima Kassory Fofana

Roger Patrick Millimono is a Guinean economist and politician. He served as an advisor at the Central Bank of the Republic of Guinea and later assumed the role of Minister of the Environment, Waters, and Forests from May 2018 to June 2020. Following this, he was appointed as Minister of Livestock in the same government under the leadership of Ibrahima Kassory Fofana until January 20, 2021. Subsequently, he served as the Minister of Agriculture until September 5, 2021.
