= Ministry of Public Works (Guinea) =

Government ministry of Guinea

- Ministère des Travaux publics(French)

Ministry overview
- Jurisdiction: Government of Guinea
- Headquarters: Conakry
- Minister responsible: Yaya Sow, Minister of Public Works

The Ministry of Public Works (French: ministère des Travaux publics) is a Guinean government ministry whose current minister is Yaya Sow. The ministry is in charge of creating, developing, executing, and overseeing government policy in the area of public works.

== Officeholders since 2007 ==
| Name | Dates in Office | | Government(s) |
|---|---|---|---|
| Thierno Oumar Bah | | | Kouyaté |
| Amadou Porédaka Diallo | | | Souaré |
| Mamadi Kallo | | | Komara |
| Yamoudou Toré | | | Doré |
| Ousmane Bah | | | Saïd Fofana I |
| Mohamed Traoré | | | Saïd Fofana II |
| Oumou Camara | 26/12/2015 | 17/05/2018 | Youla |
| Moustapha Naité | 26/05/2018 | 19/01/2021 | Kassory I |
| Kadiatou Émilie Diaby | 19/01/2021 | 05/09/2021 | Kassory II |
| Yaya Sow | | | Transition Government |
In the interim between mandates, the exiting minister assures the management of current affairs.
