= Ministry of National Unity and Citizenship (Guinea) =

Government ministry of Guinea

- Ministère de l'Unité nationale et de la Citoyenneté (French)

Ministry overview
- Jurisdiction: Government of Guinea
- Headquarters: Conakry
- Minister responsible: Djalikatou Diallo, Minister of National Unity and Citizenship

The Ministry of National Unity and Citizenship is a Guinean ministry created October 5, 2012 whose latest officeholder was Djalikatou Diallo.

== Officeholders since 2012 ==
Name	Dates in Office		Government(s)
Kalifa Gassama Diaby	05/10/2012	14/11/2018	Saïd Fofana I and II, Youla and Kassory I
Mamadou Taran Diallo	18/11/2018	15/01/2021	Kassory I
Djalikatou Diallo	29/04/2021	5/09/2021	Kassory II
