= Mariama Sylla =

Senegalese film director

- Occupations: Theatre director, actress, singer
- Years active: 2004-present

Mariama Sylla Faye is a theatre director, actress, and singer working in French-speaking Switzerland.

== Biography ==
In 1996 she received her diploma at the École supérieure d'art dramatique de Genève. Sylla began her career as a theatre actress in French-speaking Switzerland. She performed under the directors Claude Stratz, Charles Joris, Dominique Catton, Gilles Laubert, Raoul Pastor, Philippe Mentha, and Georges Guerreiro.

She has performed voice-over work for radio and television.

She assisted Julien George in the staging of La Puce à l'Oreille in 2012. She directed Allons enfants voir si la rose est un cheval vu de dos by Joël Bastard at the Théâtre Am Stram Gram in 2013. Sylla directed Jean et Béatrice by Carole Fréchette at the Théâtre Le Crève-Cœur in 2015. The following year, she directed Jean-Luc by Fabrice Melquiot at the Théâtre Am Stram Gram. Sylla has taught in conservatories and led theatre workshops.

== Filmography ==
- 2004 : Welcome to Switzerland (actress, as Amelia)
- 2008 : Tierra roja (short film, actress)
- 2017-2019 : Quartier des banques (TV series, actress)
