= Nanfadima Magassouba =

Guinean activist and politician

- Occupation: Women's rights activist, politician, minister
- Political party: Rally of the Guinean People

Nanfadima Magassouba is a Guinean women's rights activist and politician. She was head of the National Coalition of Guinea for the Rights and Citizenship of Women (CONAG-DCF), and since 2013 has been a member of Guinea's National Assembly.

== Life ==
Magassoubawas was born in Koundara Prefecture. Though she has worked with trade unions and community groups for three decades, she came to wider recognition as president of CONAG-DCF. Under Magassouba's leadership, CONAG gained national status as the leading women's rights organization, and was recognized as an advisory group to the United Nations.

In the 2013 election she was elected a member of the National Assembly for the Rally of the Guinean People (RPG). She has been Minister of National Solidarity, and Promotion of Women and Children in Guinea. Credited with ensuring Alpha Condé's victory in Koundara in the 2015 Guinean presidential election, Magassoubawas continued to be a visible RPG campaigner in Koundara. In June 2016 she was appointed to succeed Mamady Diawara as chairman of the delegations commission of the RPG Rainbow Alliance.

In May 2017 Magassouba participated in the 4th Forum for African Political Leaders at Yale University.

Magassoubawas served as president of the network of women parliamentarians, before being succeeded in July 2016 by Fatoumata Binta Diallo of the Union of Democratic Forces of Guinea. As a woman parliamentarian, she was voiced their opposition to the legalization of polygamy in Guinea. On December 29 2018, along with all 26 women members of parliament, Magassouba refused to vote for the revisions to the Civil Code which legalized polygamy, which had been banned since 1968:

Our mothers, aunts and grandmothers fought hard for this ban. There is no question of going back on these achievements. We want to move forward.
