= Ministry of Agriculture and Livestock =

Government ministry of Guinea

- Ministère de l'Élevage et des Productions animales (French)

Ministry overview
- Jurisdiction: Government of Guinea
- Headquarters: Conakry
- Minister responsible: Mamadou Nagnalen Barry, Minister of Agriculture and Livestock
- Website: Ministry of Agriculture and Livestock (In French)

The Ministry of Agriculture and Livestock is a Guinean ministry. The incumbent is currently Mamadou Nagnalen Barry.

== Officeholders since 2010 ==
Name	Dates in Office		Government(s)
Mouctar Diallo	15/02/2010	24/12/2010	Doré
Mamadou Korka Diallo	24/12/2010	15/01/2014	Saïd Fofana I
Thierno Ousmane Diallo	24/01/2014	26/12/2015	Saïd Fofana II
Mohamed Tall	26/12/2015	17/05/2018	Youla
Roger Patrick Millimono	03/06/2020	05/09/2021	Kassory I and II
Mamadou Nagnalen Barry	10/29/2021		Béavogui
