= Aboubacar Sidiki Camara (politician) =

Guinean general and politician

Aboubacar Sidiki Camara is a Guinean politician and army general who has served as Minister of Defence in the Cabinet of Guinea since 2021.

== Career ==
Camara is a former army officer who was appointed to the government following the ousting of President Alpha Condé. In Summer 2021, he made his first overseas trip, visiting France and met with Minister of the Armed Forces Florence Parly.
