= Cabinet of Guinea =

The Cabinet of Guinea is the highest executive body in Guinea.

== List of cabinets ==
- Cabinet of the First Republic of Guinea (1958–1984)
- Béavogui/Goumou government (2021–2024)
- Bah Oury I (2024–2026)
- Bah Oury II (since 2026)

== See also ==
- Politics of Guinea
- Government ministries of Guinea
