= Ministry of Transport (Guinea) =

Government ministry of Guinea

- Ministère des Transports (French)
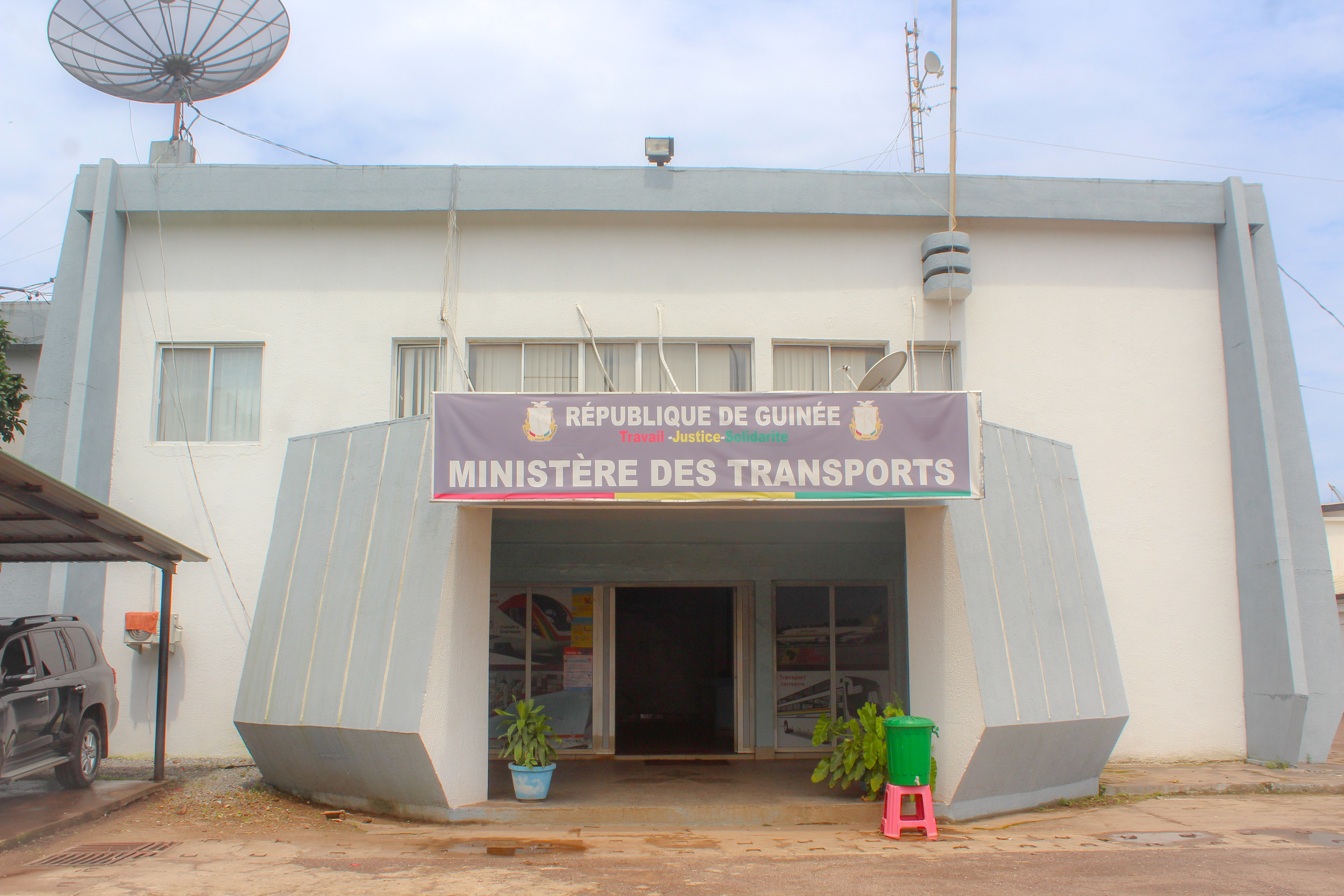

Ministry overview
- Jurisdiction: Government of Guinea
- Headquarters: Kaloum, Conakry
- Employees: 1,360
- Annual budget: GNF 107,000,000,000 (2020)
- Minister responsible: Felix Lamah, Minister of Transport
- Ministry executives: Mamadou Saliou Diaby, Secretary-General; Fatoumata Binta Barry, Chef de Cabinet
- Website: transports-gov-gn.com

The Ministry of Transport (French: ministère des Transports) is a Guinean government ministry whose current minister is Felix Lamah. The ministry is in charge of creating, developing, executing, and overseeing government policy in the area of Transport and Meteorology.

== Organization ==
- Minister
- Secretary General
- Chef de Cabinet
  - Main Advisor
  - Legal Advisor
  - Economic Analysis Advisor
  - Land and Marine transport advisor
  - Air and Meteorological advisor
  - Cabinet Attaché
- Support Services
  - National Department of Ground Transport
  - Nationale Department of Commercial Shipping
- Attached Services
  - Meteorological Stations
- Autonomous Public Bodies
  - Autorité Guinéenne de l'Aviation Civile (AGAC)
  - Agence de la Navigation Maritime (ANAM)
  - Agence de Navigation Aérienne (ANA)
  - Agence Nationale de Météorologie (ANM)
  - Conseil Guinéen des Chargeurs (CGC)
  - Autorité Organisatrice des Transports Urbains de Conakry (AOTUC)
  - Agence Guinéenne de Sécurité Routière (AGUISER)
  - Port Autonome de Conakry (PAC)
  - Société Navale Guinéenne (SNG)
  - Société Nationale des Chemins de Fer de Guinée (SNCFG)

== Officeholders ==
Name	In Office		Title	Government(s)
Ismaël Touré	1958	1963	Minister of Public Works, Transport and Communication	Cabinet de la Première République de Guinée
Roger Nagib Accar	1963	1967	Minister of Transport	Cabinet de la Première République de Guinée
Elhadj Mory Keita	1967	1969	Minister of Transport	Cabinet de la Première République de Guinée
Karim Bangoura	1969	1970	State Minister of Transport	Cabinet de la Première République de Guinée
Mory Candia Savané	1970	1971	State Minister of Transport	Cabinet de la Première République de Guinée
Émile Condé		1971	State Minister of Transport	Cabinet de la Première République de Guinée
A Diomba Mara	1971	1972	State Minister of Transport	Gouvernement Louis Beavogui
Mamadi Kaba			Minister of Transport	Gouvernement Louis Beavogui
Saikou Thiam			Minister of Transport	Gouvernement Louis Beavogui
Toumany Sangaré	1978	1979	Minister of Transport	Gouvernement Louis Beavogui
Mouctar Diallo	1979	1980	Minister of Transport	Gouvernement Louis Beavogui
N’Fa Siaka Touré	1980	1984	Minister of Transport	Gouvernement Louis Beavogui
commandant Abdourahmane Kaba	1984	1985	Minister of Transport	Gouvernement Diarra Traoré
Commandant Babacar N'Diaye	1985	1988	Minister d’état aux transports	
Commandant Facinet Touré	1988	1991	Minister des transports et des travaux publics	
Commandant Ibrahima Diallo	1991	1992	Minister of Transport and Public Works	
Nantenin Camara	1993	1994	Minister of Transport	
Ibrahima Sylla	1994	1996	Minister of Transport	
Cellou Dalein Diallo	1996	2004	Minister of Transport and Public Works	
Aliou Condé	2004	2006	Minister of Transport	
Alpha Ibrahima Keira	2006	2007	Minister of Transport	
Boubacar Sow	2007	2008	Minister of Transport	Gouvernement Kouyaté
Mohamed Cheikh Touré	June 2008	December 2008	Minister of Transport	Gouvernement Souaré
Mohamed Kaba	15 January 2009	15 February 2010	Minister of Transport	Gouvernement Komara
Général Mathurin Bangoura	2010	2010	Minister of Transport	Gouvernement Doré
Elhadj Ahmed Tidjane Touré	27 December 2010	20 January 2014	Minister of Transport	Gouvernement Saïd Fofana I
Aliou Diallo	24/12/2010	26/12/2015		Saïd Fofana I et II
Oyé Lamah Guilavogui	26/12/2015	17/05/2018		Youla
Aboubacar Sylla	26/05/2018	5/9/2021		Kassory I et II
Felix Lamah	18/11/2022	In Office		Bernard Goumou
