= Remy Lamah =

Guinean politician

Dr Colonel Remy Lamah

Minister of Health
- Incumbent
- Assumed office 2014

Remy Lamah is a Guinean politician who has been Minister of Health in the Cabinet of Guinea since 2014. He was previously CEO of the health services of the Guinean armed forces. In October 2021, he was retired from the army.
