= Ministry of Culture, Tourism and Handicrafts =

Government ministry of Guinea

- Ministère de la Culture, du Tourisme et de l'Artisanat (French)

Ministry overview
- Jurisdiction: Government of Guinea
- Headquarters: Conakry
- Minister responsible: Alpha Soumah, Minister of Culture, Tourism and Handicrafts

The Ministry of Culture, Tourism and Handicrafts (French: ministère de la Culture, du Tourisme et de l'Artisanat) is a Guinean government ministry whose current minister is Alpha Soumah.

== Officeholders since 2010 ==
| Name | Dates in Office | | Government(s) |
|---|---|---|---|
| Mariam Bah | 24/12/2010 | 15/01/2014 | Saïd Fofana I |
| Louceny Camara | 24/01/2014 | 26/12/2015 | Saïd Fofana II |
| Thierno Ousmane Diallo | 26/12/2015 | 19/06/2020 | Youla and Kassory I |
| Salla Fanta Camara | 19/06/2020 | 05/09/2021 | Kassory II |
| Alpha Soumah | 4/11/2021 | In Office | Béavogui |
In the interim between mandates, the exiting minister assures the management of current affairs. Successive titles : 2021 : Ministry of Hospitality, Tourism and Handicrafts; Since November 2021 : Ministry of Culture, Tourism and Handicrafts
