= Bah Oury =

Prime Minister of Guinea (2024–present)

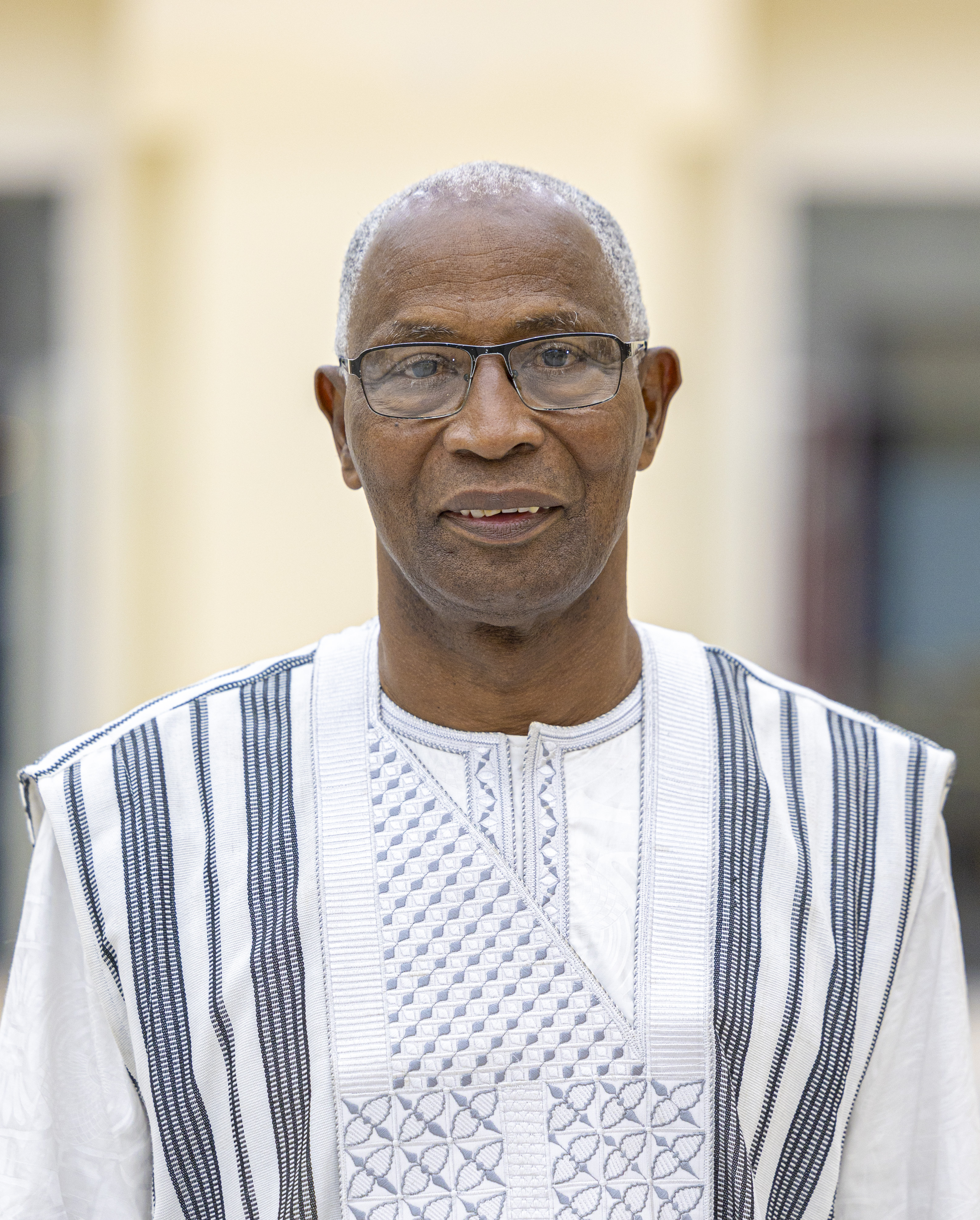
- Oury in 2024

Prime Minister of Guinea
- Incumbent
- Assumed office 27 February 2024
- President: Mamadi Doumbouya
- Preceded by: Bernard Goumou

Personal details
- Born: March 1958 (age 68) Pita, Guinea
- Party: Union of Democratic Forces of Guinea; Union of Democrats for the Rebirth of Guinea; Union for Democracy and Development

Amadou Oury Bah (born March 1958) is a Guinean politician who has been the Prime Minister of Guinea since 2024. He has been a member and held leadership positions in the Union of Democratic Forces of Guinea, Union of Democrats for the Rebirth of Guinea, and the Union for Democracy and Development. Prior to his tenure as prime minister he was Minister of National Reconciliation.

== Early life ==
Amadou Oury Bah was born in Pita, Guinea, in March 1958. At age 6 his family moved to Senegal in order to flee the dictatorship of Ahmed Sékou Touré. He returned to Guinea after Touré died in 1984.

== Career ==
The Union of Democratic Forces of Guinea (UFDG) was founded by Oury in 1991. He was vice president of the UFDG when he was expelled for insubordination in February 2016. He became the leader of the Union of Democrats for the Rebirth of Guinea (UDRG). He joined the Union for Democracy and Development (UDD) in September 2019, and became its president before leaving the party on 11 May 2020.

In 2007, Oury was appointed as Minister of National Reconciliation after 130 people were killed during protests. An attack was conducted against President Alpha Condé's house in 2011. Oury fled to France where he lived in exile for four years. In 2016, Condé pardoned him and he returned to Guinea.

Condé was overthrown by a coup d'état in 2021. On 27 February 2024, Oury was appointed as Prime Minister of Guinea by the military junta and formed the first Oury government. His cabinet consists of 29 people, with 6 of those people being women. The 2025 census was suspended due to its ineffective methodology. The cabinet submitted their resignations after the inauguration of President Mamady Doumbouya in 2026, but Oury was reappointed as prime minister on 26 January forming the second Oury government.

== Works cited ==
=== News ===
- "Amadou Oury Bah re-appointed prime minister under Guinea's new government". Africanews. 27 January 2026. Archived from the original on 28 January 2026.
- "Guinea appoints former opposition leader Mamadou Oury Bah as prime minister". France 24. 28 February 2024. Archived from the original on 4 July 2025.
- Aradi, Gloria (28 February 2024). "Guinea junta appoints Mamadou Oury Bah as new prime minister". BBC. Archived from the original on 4 July 2025.
- Barry, Diawo (28 February 2024). "En Guinée, pourquoi Doumbouya a choisi Bah Oury comme Premier ministre". Jeune Afrique. Archived from the original on 4 July 2025.
- Barry, Diawo (4 March 2017). "Guinée – Bah Oury: Il faut changer la direction de l'UFDG". Jeune Afrique. Archived from the original on 4 July 2025.
- Diallo, Fatoumata (13 May 2020). "Guinée: pourquoi Bah Oury a quitté la présidence de l'UDD". Jeune Afrique. Archived from the original on 4 July 2025.
- Diallo, Mouctar (27 February 2024). "Ce Qu'il Faut Savoir Sur Bah Oury, Le Nouveau Premier Ministre!". Billetdujour. Archived from the original on 4 July 2025.
- Rafanomezantsoa, Andriamihaja (14 March 2024). "Qui est Bah Oury?". L'Écho du Sud. Archived from the original on 19 March 2025.
- Yansané, Sidy (28 March 2025). "Guinée: le Premier ministre Bah Oury confirme que le recensement est en pause". Radio France Internationale. Archived from the original on 4 July 2025.

=== Web ===
- "Strengthening women's political participation in Guinea". Institute for Security Studies. 2 July 2025. Archived from the original on 4 July 2025.

Political offices
Preceded by Bernard Goumou	Prime Minister of Guinea; 2024–present	Incumbent
