= Bernard Goumou =

Prime Minister of Guinea (2022–2024)

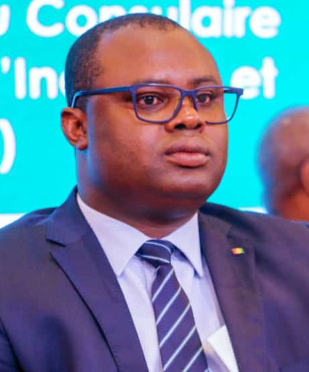
- Goumou in 2022

Prime Minister of Guinea
- In office 16 July 2022 – 19 February 2024; Acting: 16 July 2022 – 20 August 2022
- President: Mamady Doumbouya
- Preceded by: Mohamed Béavogui
- Succeeded by: Bah Oury

Personal details
- Born: 8 September 1980 (age 45) Abidjan, Ivory Coast
- Party: Independent

Bernard Goumou (born 8 September 1980) is a Guinean politician who served as the prime minister of Guinea, having been appointed after interim prime minister Mohamed Béavogui became "unavailable for health reasons".

== Biography ==
Before entering politics, Goumou served as managing director of Lanala Assurance from 2017.

== Political career ==
Goumou was appointed as the Minister of Trade, Industry and Small and Medium Enterprises in the transitionary Béavogui government on 27 October 2021.

He was appointed to serve as interim Prime Minister of Guinea after the previous interim prime minister Mohamed Béavogui became unavailable for "health reasons". His appointment was announced on national television.

The ruling junta dissolved the Béavogui/Goumou cabinet on 19 February 2024 without providing a reason for the dissolution.

Political offices
Preceded by Mariama Camara	Minister of Trade, Industry and Small and Medium Enterprises; 2021–2022	Succeeded by Rose Pola Pricemou
Preceded by Mohamed Béavogui	Prime Minister of Guinea; 2022–2024	Succeeded by Bah Oury
