= Ministry of Urban Affairs and Spatial Planning (Guinea) =

Government ministry of Guinea

Minister of Urban Affairs and Spatial Planning
- Ministère de la Ville et de l'Aménagement du territoire (French)

Ministry overview
- Jurisdiction: Government of Guinea
- Headquarters: Conakry
- Minister responsible: Ibrahima Sory Bangoura, Minister of Urban Affairs and Spatial Planning

The Minister of Urban Affairs and Spatial Planning of the Republic of Guinea (Ministère de la Ville et de l'Aménagement du territoire) is a Guinean ministry whose minister is Ibrahima Sory Bangoura.

== Officeholders since 2010 ==
Name	Dates in Office		Government(s)
Mathurin Bangoura	24/12/2010	15/01/2014	Saïd Fofana I
Ibrahima Bangoura	24/01/2014	26/12/2015	Saïd Fofana II
Louseny Camara	26/12/2015	23/08/2017	Youla
Ibrahima Kourouma	23/08/2017	05/09/2021	Youla, Kassory I and Kassory II
Ousmane Gaoual Diallo	04/11/2021	10/08/2022	Béavogui
Ibrahima Sory Bangoura	10/08/2022	Incumbent	Bernard Goumou
