= Ministry of Health (Guinea) =

Government ministry of Guinea

- Ministère de la Santé

Ministry overview
- Jurisdiction: Republic of Guinea
- Minister responsible: Khaité Sall
- Website: sante.gov.gn

The Ministry of Health and Sanitation is a ministry of the government of Guinea, with its headquarters in the capital city Conakry.

As of February 2026, the Minister of Health is Khaité Sall.

== Officeholders since 2010 ==
Name	Dates in Office	
Naman Keita	24 December 2010	15 January 2014
Remy Lamah	24 January 2014	26 December 2015
Abdourahmane Diallo	26 December 2015	17 May 2018
Édouard Niankoye Lamah	17 May 2018	11 November 2019
Remy Lamah	11 November 2019	5 September 2021
Mamadou Pathé Diallo	25 October 2021	21 November 2023
Oumar Diouhé Bah	21 November 2023	2 February 2026
Khaité Sall	2 February 2026	In Office

== See also ==
- Health in Guinea
