= Gamal Abdel Nasser University of Conakry =

University in Conakry, Guinea

Coordinates: 9°32′40″N 13°40′35″W

- L'Université Gamal Abdel Nasser de Conakry (French)
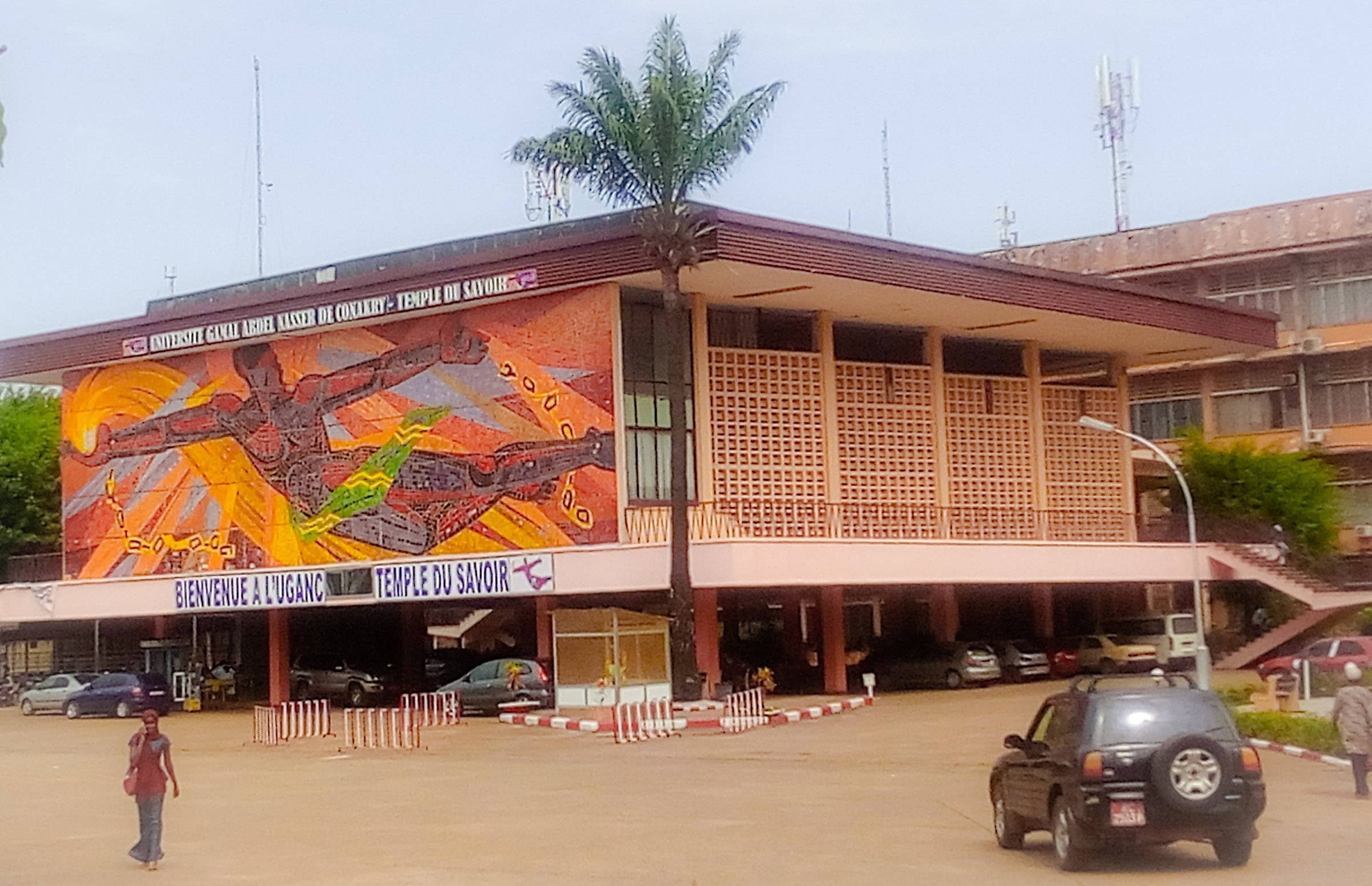
- Former names: Institut Polytechnique de Conakry, Institut Polytechnique Gamal Abdel Nasser de Conakry
- Type: Public
- Established: 1962
- Location: Conakry, Guinea
- Campus: Urban
- Nickname: UGANC
- Website: University website

Gamal Abdel Nasser University of Conakry (in French L'Université Gamal Abdel Nasser de Conakry, UGANC) is the largest university in Guinea. It is located in Dixinn Commune, Conakry, Guinea. The name is generally shortened to the University of Conakry.

== History ==
The university came into being in 1962 as the Institut Polytechnique de Conakry, the first institution of higher education in Guinea, with the assistance of the Soviet Union. It was established during a period of progressive economic development in the country after independence. In 1970, the school's name was changed to the Institut Polytechnique Gamal Abdel Nasser de Conakry (IPGAN), after the popular Egyptian President Gamal Abdel Nasser. In 1989, it was renamed again, this time to the Université Gamal Abdel Nasser de Conakry.

In 1965, the separate École supérieure d'administration was incorporated into the Institut Polytechnique.

The university has a campus-wide computer network with a fiber optic backbone and 100BaseT Ethernet cabling as of 2007 along with 1,000 computers for university staff. The United States Agency for International Development helped set up the network and internet connection. Each faculty provides a computer lab for faculty and students, however the ratio of computers to users is only 1:100. Online university courses are offered.

In 2002, the university entrance exam was controversially abolished.

== Faculties ==
The university had 13 schools and faculties, including medicine. It currently has a Faculté de Médecine, Pharmacie et Odontostomatologie (Faculty of Medicine, Pharmacy and Dentistry), with a department for each of the three disciplines: a Faculté des Sciences (Faculty of Sciences), with biology, chemistry, mathematics and physics departments; a Centre d’Etude et de Recherche en Environnement (Centre for Study and Environmental Research); a Centre Informatique (Computing Centre); and an Institut Polytechnique (Polytechnic Institute), with departments of electrical engineering, civil engineering, computer engineering, chemical engineering, industrial engineering and maintenance, mechanical engineering and telecommunications.

On 21 September 2015, a protocol of agreement was signed in Conakry between Guinea and the Institut Pasteur to create the Institut Pasteur of Guinea, which will be an independent department of the University of Conakry.

The Herbier National De Guinée, the national herbarium of Guinea, is also housed within the university.

== Notable alumni ==
- Fatoumata Barry, Guinea's first woman architect

== See also ==
- List of Islamic educational institutions
- List of buildings and structures in Guinea
