= National Committee of Reconciliation and Development =

Guinean military junta ruling since 2021

The National Committee of Reconciliation and Development (French: Comité national du rassemblement pour le développement, CNRD) was the ruling military junta of Guinea from 5 September 2021 to 17 January 2026.

== Historical background ==
The CNRD seized power in the 2021 Guinean coup d'état on 5 September 2021. Colonel Mamady Doumbouya, leader of the coup, stated that the CNRD would steer the country for an 18-month transition period.

== Members ==
- President : Mamadi Doumbouya

=== Vice President of Guinea ===
- Chief of Staff of the Guinean Army: Colonel Sidiba Koulibaly
- Senior Commander of the National Gendarmerie: Colonel Balla Samoura
- Minister Secretary General of the Presidency of the Republic: Amara Camara
- Spokesperson: Lieutenant Colonel Aminata Diallo
- Member: Colonel Mohamed Sylla, Aboubacar Sidiki Camara

== See also ==
- Politics of Guinea
