= Mohamed Béavogui =

Prime minister of Guinea

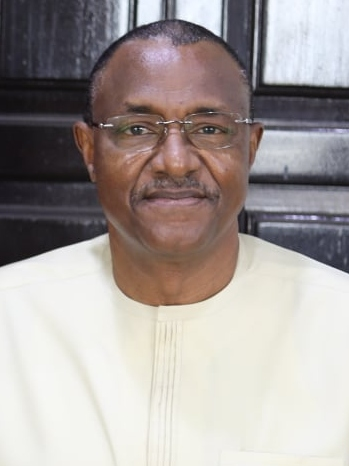
- Béavogui in 2022

Prime Minister of Guinea
- In office 6 October 2021 – 17 July 2022
- President: Mamady Doumbouya
- Preceded by: Ibrahima Kassory Fofana
- Succeeded by: Bernard Goumou

Personal details
- Born: 15 August 1953 (age 73) Porédaka, French Guinea, French West Africa
- Party: Independent

Mohamed Béavogui (born 15 August 1953) is a Guinean diplomat and politician, and the former interim prime minister of Guinea from 6 October 2021 to 17 July 2022.

== Biography ==
Béavogui was born in August 1953 in Porédaka, the son of a diplomat, and the nephew of former Chairperson of the African Union Commission, Diallo Telli. He began studying at Gamal Abdel Nasser University of Conakry in 1972. He then earned a master's degree in engineering from the Kalinin Politechnical Institute in the Soviet Union, and a degree in executive management from the John F. Kennedy School of Government at Harvard University in the United States.

From 1982 to 1986, he worked in Nigeria, before being recruited as a consultant by the Food and Agriculture Organization of the United Nations. In 2001, he was named the Regional Director for West and Central Africa for the International Fund for Agricultural Development (IFAD), a post he held until 2011. In October 2011, he became the Director of Partnership and Resource Mobilization and Senior Advisor to the President of IFAD. In 2015, he was named Director General of the African Risk Capacity Group.

== Prime minister ==
On 6 October 2021, a month after the 2021 Guinean coup d'état, he was named transitional prime minister of Guinea by interim president Mamady Doumbouya.

On 16 July 2022, Bernard Goumou took over as prime minister. The government cited Béavogui's health as the reason for this shift.

The ruling junta dissolved the Béavogui/Goumou cabinet on 19 February 2024 without providing a reason for the dissolution.
