= Mamady Doumbouya =

President of Guinea since 2021

General Mamady Doumbouya
- ߡߊ߬ߡߊߘߌ߫ ߘߎ߲ߓߎߦߊ߫
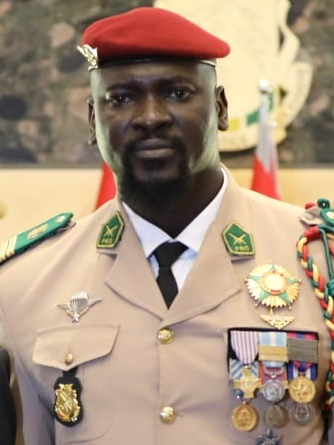
- Doumbouya in 2022

5th President of Guinea
- Incumbent
- Assumed office 1 October 2021 (Note: Interim: 1 October 2021 – 17 January 2026)
- Prime Minister: Mohamed Béavogui; Bernard Goumou; Bah Oury
- Preceded by: Alpha Condé

Chairman of the National Committee of Reconciliation and Development
- De facto
- In office 5 September 2021 – 17 January 2026
- Preceded by: Office established
- Succeeded by: Office abolished

Personal details
- Born: 5 December 1984 (age 41) Kankan, Guinea
- Party: GMD; Independent (until 2025)
- Spouse: Lauriane Darboux
- Children: 4

Military service
- Allegiance: France (formerly); Guinea
- Branch/service: French Foreign Legion (formerly); Guinea Army
- Rank: General

Mamady Doumbouya (N'Ko: ߡߊ߬ߡߊߘߌ߫ ߘߎ߲ߓߎߦߊ߫, born 5 December 1984) is a Guinean general serving as the current fifth president of Guinea since 1 October 2021. He maintained his position after he won the 2025 Guinean presidential election in a landslide victory. Doumbouya led a coup d'état on 5 September 2021 that overthrew the previous president, Alpha Condé.

He is a member of the Special Forces Group of the Guinean military and a former French legionnaire. On the day of the coup, Doumbouya issued a broadcast on state television declaring that his faction had dissolved the government and constitution. On 1 October 2021, Doumbouya was sworn in as interim president. He became the head of the military junta that seized power following the coup d'état.

== Early life ==
Doumbouya was born on 5 December 1984 in the Kankan Region of Guinea. He is of Mandinka origins. He attended primary school at Dramé Oumar school.

== Military career ==
Doumbouya was a French legionnaire holding the rank of corporal until the end of his contract in 2009.

He returned to Guinea in 2011, where he was posted to the Centre d'instruction d'infanterie of Camp Kwamé Krumah first as instructor and then as Director of studies. He received unit commander training in Senegal and then was posted to Kindia's Centre d'instruction d'infanterie.

In 2018, Doumbouya was named head of the Special Forces Group, an elite military unit created by President Alpha Condé. When he took office, receiving promotion to the rank of battalion commander, his international experience was cited, including training he had completed in a number of different countries. In 2018, he met Assimi Goïta, from Mali, in Burkina Faso at a US Army training session for regional special forces commanders. Both he and Assimi Goïta would later launch military coups against their governments. He worked in this role for country's intelligence services, based in Forécariah. He was further promoted to lieutenant colonel in 2019 and to colonel in 2020. In 2021, he was said to have been seeking more authority for the Special Forces Group. During his presidency, he was promoted to general in 2024 and at the same time, resigned from his command of the Special Forces Group.

Doumbouya was deployed on missions to Afghanistan, Ivory Coast, Djibouti, Central African Republic, Israel, Cyprus, the UK and Guinea, during his 15-year career.

He was one of 25 officials from Guinea that the European Union threatened to sanction over allegations of human rights abuses of journalists, such as Foniké Menguè, and Habib Marouane Camara.

In May 2021, there were rumors stemming from the government of a possible arrest of Doumbouya while he was in Conakry on unknown accusations or charges.

== 2021 coup d'état ==
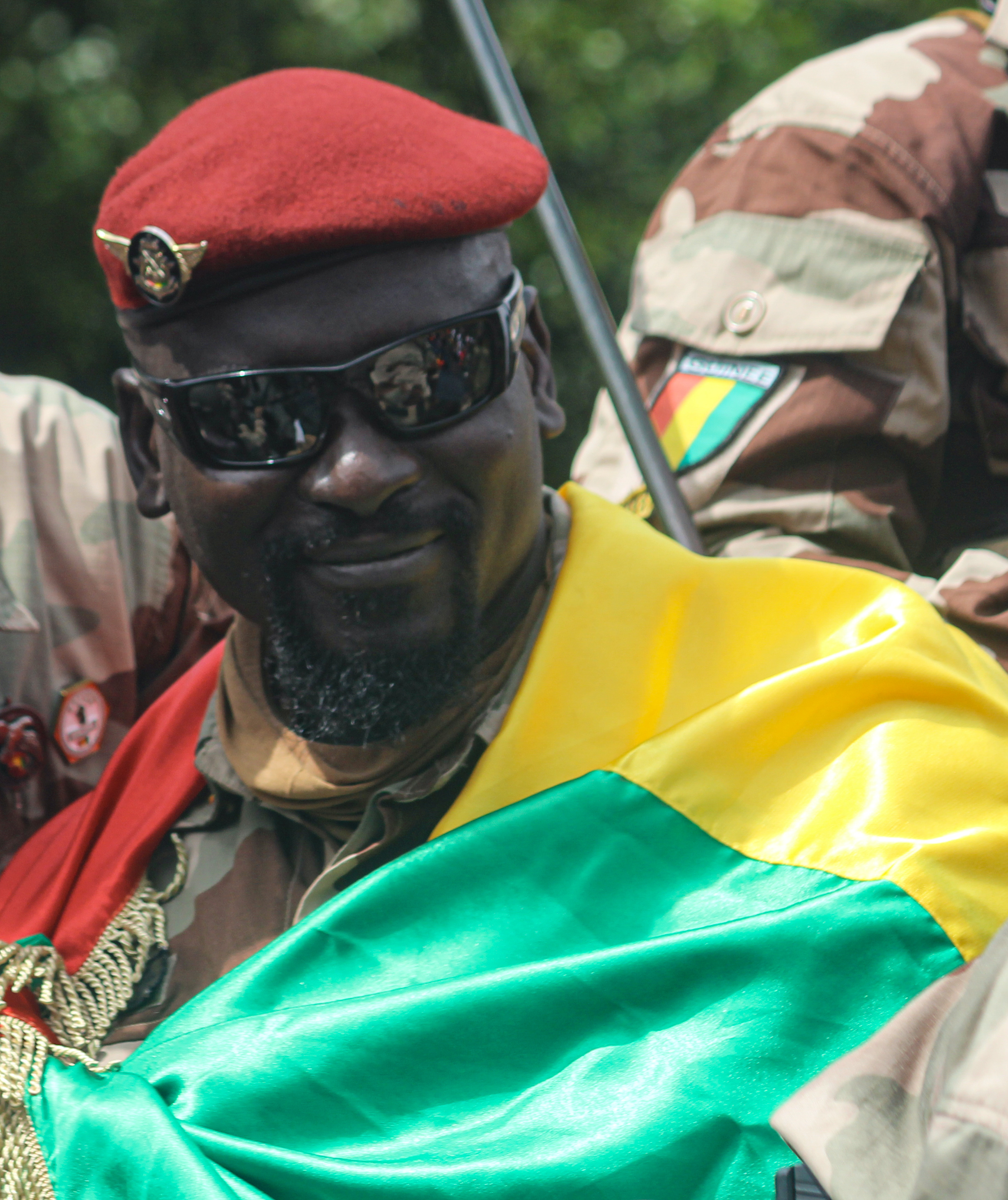
Mamadi Doumbouya the day the coup took place

Doumbouya was the instigator of the 5 September 2021 Guinean coup d'état, in which the president of Guinea, Alpha Condé, was detained. Doumbouya issued a broadcast on state television declaring that his faction had dissolved the government and constitution. He also said that the "National Committee of Reconciliation and Development (CNRD), [was forced] to take its responsibility" after "the dire political situation of our country, the instrumentalization of the judiciary, the non-respect of democratic principles, the extreme politicization of public administration, as well as poverty and corruption." In justifying the military's actions, Doumbouya quoted the former Ghanaian president Jerry Rawlings, who said that "if the people are crushed by their elites, it is up to the army to give the people their freedom."

== Interim president of Guinea (2021–2026) ==
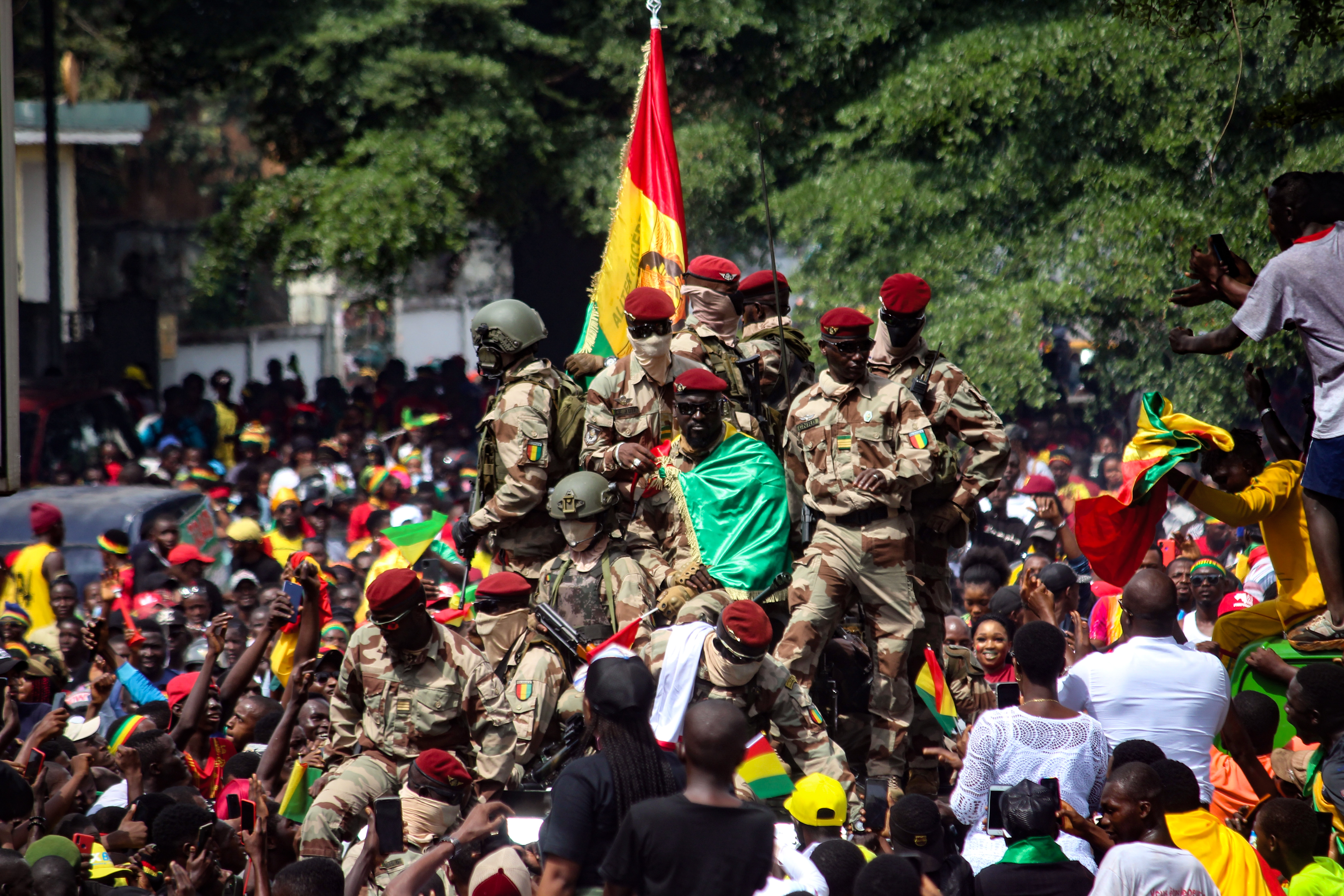
Mamadi Doumbouya on 2 October 2021

After taking power, he forced office holders to attend his first meeting, lest they be considered rebels. Then during his broadcast he would announce that ex-president Alpha Condé would not be released and that they would still give him healthcare. Doumbouya downplayed possible economic sanctions by ECOWAS, saying through a spokesman that "as soldiers, their work is in Guinea and there is nothing to freeze in their accounts." The ECOWAS representatives also urged the junta to allow ousted president Condé to leave Guinea; the junta has refused to do so.

On 1 October 2021, Doumbouya was sworn in as interim president at Mohammed V Palace in Conakry. He announced plans to "refound the state" introducing "free, credible and transparent" elections and respecting "all the national and international commitments to which the country has subscribed".

On Mali's 62nd anniversary of independence, Doumbouya met with Malian president Assimi Goïta in which he was welcomed by him. They discussed about many issues during his visit.

Doumbouya met with Paul Kagame of Rwanda in Guinea; the first such meeting with a foreign head of state since the 2021 Guinean coup d'état. Doumbouya was inspired by Kagame to reform and reconcile his nation like Kagame did to Rwanda.

Anti-government protestors have been threatened with life in prison by Doumbouya and the junta.

On 19 February 2024, Doumbouya and the National Committee of Reconciliation and Development ordered the dissolution of the interim government in preparation of the new presidential elections to be held on a later date.

On 22 July 2024, after the disappearance of the political activists Foniké Menguè and Billo Bah, who are associated with the National Front for the Defense of the Constitution (FNDC), their families filed a complaint in Paris, France against Mamadi Doumbouya.

On 28 March 2025, Doumbouya granted a pardon on health grounds to former president Moussa Dadis Camara, who was convicted over the killing of 156 people during the 2009 Guinean protests.

In June 2025, the Lawyer's Order of Guinea boycotted hearings for two weeks and their members left national institutions in which they served in reaction to the kidnapping and torture of Mohamed Traoré, the Order's ex-bâtonnier and a critic of Doumbouya.

Under Doumbouya's rule, the 2025 Guinean constitutional referendum was held on 21 September, with around 89% of voters approving a proposed new constitution. On 3 November, Doumbouya submitted his candidacy for the 2025 Guinean presidential election scheduled on 28 December. He won the election with 86.72% of the vote and was inaugurated on 17 January 2026 as a civilian president.

In January 2026, due to Doumbouya's civilian inauguration, the African Union lifted the sanctions it had imposed on Guinea following the 2021 coup. However, on 6 March 2026, the government unilaterally dissolved 40 political parties, including the three main opposition parties in the country (UFDG, RPG and UFR).

=== Economic policies ===
Mamadi Doumbouya allows Chinese investment and funding mostly in the mining sector.

== Personal life ==
Doumbouya is married to Lauriane Darboux, who is an active duty member of the French National Gendarmerie. The couple has five children.

== Notes ==
Political offices
Preceded by Alpha Condé	President of Guinea; 2021–present	Incumbent
