= Elections in Guinea =

Guinea elects on the national level a head of state—the president—and a legislature. The president is elected for a five-year term by the people through a two-round system (i.e. if no candidate secures a majority of the votes, there is a runoff between the top two vote-getters). The National Assembly (Assemblée Nationale) has 114 members, elected for five-year terms, 38 members in single-seat constituencies and 76 members by proportional representation.

Voters must be at least 18 years old and Guinean citizens in full possession of civil and political rights. Candidates must be at 18, either Guinean by citizenship or naturalized and resident in the country for at least 10 years. There are also various disqualifications.

== History ==
When Guinea gained its independence from France in 1958, Ahmed Sékou Touré became its first president, as his Parti démocratique de Guinée (DPG, Democratic Party of Guinea) had won 56 of 60 seats in the 1957 Territorial Assembly election. By 1960, he had declared the DPG the only legal party, so, for the next 24 years, all the voters could do was elect the DPG candidates to the National Assembly, while Touré ran unopposed for the presidency three more times.

After Touré's death in 1984, Colonels Lansana Conté and Diarra Traoré seized power in a bloodless coup d'état, with Conté assuming the presidency. In December 1990, a new constitution created a unicameral Parliament. In April 1992, legislation was passed making Guinea a multi-party state. The following year, Conté announced a return to civilian rule, with Guinea's first multi-party presidential election taking place in 1993, followed by a legislative election in 1995. Conté remained president, with 51.7% of the vote, while his Party of Unity and Progress (PUP, Parti de l'Unité et du Progrès) won 71 of the 114 seats in the Assembly. He was re-elected president in 1998, with 56.1% of the vote, and 2003, with 95.6% of the vote after all the major opposition leaders boycotted the election. His party also won 85 seats in the Assembly in 2002, with some opposition parties choosing to boycott.

Shortly after Conté's death in December 2008, Moussa Dadis Camara seized power. In December 2009, Camara was shot in the head in an assassination attempt and left the country to obtain medical care. The following month, Camara agreed to a return to civilian rule.

No candidate won a majority of the votes in the first round of the 2010 presidential election, so Cellou Dalein Diallo and Alpha Condé, the top vote-getters (with 43.69% and 18.25%, respectively), contested a second round, which was delayed several times. Condé finally emerged victorious, with 52.54% of the ballots. His Guinean People's Assembly party (RPG, Rassemblement du Peuple Guinéen) took 53 of the 114 Assembly seats in the repeatedly delayed 2013 election, and seven seats won by allies gave the RPG a majority. He himself was re-elected in 2015.

== Latest elections ==
=== 2015 presidential election ===
Alpha Condé is re-elected.

Candidate	Party	Votes	%
Alpha Condé	Rally of the Guinean People	2,285,827	57.85
Cellou Dalein Diallo	Union of Democratic Forces of Guinea	1,242,362	31.44
Sidya Touré	Union of Republican Forces	237,549	6.01
Faya Lansana Millimouno	Liberal Bloc	54,718	1.38
El Hadj Papa Koly Kourouma	Generations for Reconciliation, Union, and Prosperity	51,750	1.31
Lansana Kouyaté	National Party for Hope and Development	45,962	1.16
Ghandi Faraguet Tounkara	Guinean Union for Democracy and Development	19,840	0.50
Marie Madeilein Dioubaté	Guinea Ecologists Party	13,214	0.33
Invalid/blank votes		179,804	–
Total		4,131,026	100
Registered voters/turnout		6,042,634	68.36
Source: CENI (98.2% of polling stations reporting)

=== 2020 legislative election ===
The elections were boycotted by the main opposition parties. As a result, President Condé's party won a supermajority of seats.

Party	Constituency			Proportional			Total seats	+/–
Party	Votes	%	Seats	Votes	%	Seats	Total seats	+/–
Rally of the Guinean People–Rainbow	2,417,476	88.94	37	1,591,650	55.27	42	79	+26
Guinean Democratic Union	56,085	2.06	0	151,576	5.26	4	4	New
Guinean Popular Democratic Movement	74,343	2.73	0	113,702	3.95	3	3	New
New Democratic Forces	4,711	0.17	1	76,612	2.66	2	3	New
Union for Progress and Renewal	14,597	0.54	0	76,512	2.66	2	2	+1
Rally for the Integrated Development of Guinea	23,901	0.88	0	76,412	2.65	2	2	+1
Union of the Forces of Change	–	–	–	76,208	2.65	2	2	New
Democratic Alternation for Reform–Constructive Opposition Bloc	–	–	–	76,188	2.65	2	2	New
Guinea for Democracy and Balance	31,671	1.16	0	76,012	2.64	2	2	New
Guinean Party for Renaissance and Progress	–	–	–	39,706	1.38	1	1	0
Afia Party	–	–	–	39,126	1.36	1	1	+1
Civic Generation	–	–	–	39,106	1.36	1	1	+1
Forces of Integrity for Development	–	–	–	39,106	1.36	1	1	New
Guinean Party for Progress and Development	–	–	–	38,430	1.33	1	1	+1
Rally for Renaissance and Development	10,608	0.39	0	38,310	1.33	1	1	New
Party for Peace and Development	–	–	–	38,176	1.33	1	1	New
Alliance for National Renewal	–	–	–	37,906	1.32	1	1	New
Union of Democratic Forces	13,923	0.51	0	37,900	1.32	1	1	+1
Movement of Patriots for Development	–	–	–	29,996	1.04	1	1	New
Alliance for National Renewal	–	–	–	29,800	1.03	1	1	New
New Generation for the Republic	12,917	0.47	0	29,800	1.03	1	1	0
Guinea United for Development	–	–	–	29,140	1.01	1	1	0
PDG–RDA	–	–	–	27,640	0.96	1	1	+1
Rally for a Prosperous Guinea	–	–	–	27,400	0.95	1	1	+1
Democratic Party of Conservatives	16,441	0.60	0	12,324	0.43	0	0	New
Guinean Party of the Renaissance	–	–	–	10,204	0.35	0	0	New
Union for the Defence of Republican Interests	24,046	0.88	0	7,536	0.26	0	0	New
Guinean Rally for Unity and Development	–	–	–	5,494	0.19	0	0	0
Rally for the Republic	–	–	–	5,422	0.19	0	0	New
Pan-African Party of Guinea	–	–	–	2,550	0.09	0	0	New
Alliance of Forces for Change	4,698	0.17	0	–	–	–	0	–
Party of the National Defense for Development	1,333	0.05	0	–	–	–	0	–
Party New Vision	8,038	0.30	0	–	–	–	0	–
Invalid/blank votes	252,940	–	–	126,111	–	–	–	–
Total	2,968,087	100	38	3,006,055	100	76	114	0
Registered voters/turnout	5,179,600	57.30	–	5,179,600	58.04			
Source: CENI, CC

== Election commission ==
The Independent National Electoral Commission (French: Commission Electorale Nationale Indépendante, CENI) is the election commission in Guinea. The body was established in November 2007.

== See also ==
- List of political parties in Guinea
