= List of political parties in Guinea =

This article lists political parties in Guinea.

Although Guinea has held nominally democratic multi-party elections since 1957, the country has had a history of being governed under either a dominant-party or single-party system.

- The Democratic Party of Guinea – African Democratic Rally (PDG-RDA) was the sole legal party of Guinea from 1960 to 1984, led by president Ahmed Sékou Touré until his death.
- The Unity and Progress Party (PUP) was the dominant ruling party of Guinea from 1992 to 2008, led by president Lansana Conté until his death.
- The Rally of the Guinean People (RPG) was the dominant ruling party of Guinea from 2010 to 2021, led by president Alpha Condé until his overthrow in 2021.

Currently, Guinea has a dominant-party system, with the Generation for Modernity and Development (GMD) becoming the largest party in the National Assembly following the 2026 Guinean parliamentary election. The GMD is led by president Mamady Doumbouya, a military leader who came to power following the 2021 coup d'état. In 2026, several opposition parties were forcibly dissolved by the government.

Guinea's various ethnic groups have played significant roles in Guinean politics. For example, president Alpha Conde's party, the RPG, derived most of its support from the Malinke, Guinea's second-largest ethnic group. Guinea's opposition was backed by the Fula ethnic group, who account for around 40% of Guinea's population.

== Political parties ==
=== Parliamentary parties ===
| Party | Leader | Founded | Ideology | Assembly |
|---|---|---|---|---|
| Generation for Modernity and Development; Génération pour la modernité et le développement | Mamady Doumbouya | 2025 | | 94 / 147 |

=== Other parties ===
| Party | Leader | Ideology |
|---|---|---|
| African Democratic Party of Guinea; Parti démocratique africain de Guinée | | |
| New Democratic Forces; Nouvelles forces démocratiques | Mouctar Diallo | |
| Union for Progress and Renewal; Union pour le progrès et le renouveau | Bah Ousmane | |
| Union for Development Party; Parti de l'Union pour le Développement | | |
| Union of the Forces of Change; Union des forces du changement | Aboubacar Sylla | |
| Democratic Party for Hope; Parti des démocrates pour l'espoir | Ousmane Kaba | |
| Guinean Democratic Union; Union démocratique de Guinée | Mamadou Sylla | |
| Guinean Popular Democratic Movement; Mouvement populaire démocratique de Guinée | Siaka Barry | |
| Rally for the Integrated Development of Guinea; Rassemblement pour le développement intégré de la Guinée | | |
| Democratic Alternation for Reform–Constructive Opposition Bloc; Alternance démocratique pour le changement-Bloc de l'opposition constructive | | |
| Guinea for Democracy and Balance; Guinée pour la démocratie et l'équilibre | | |
| Guinean Party for Renaissance and Progress; Parti guinéen pour la renaissance et le progrès | Alpha Ibrahima Sila Bah | |
| Afia Party; Parti Afia | | |
| Civic Generation; Génération citoyenne | | |
| Forces of Integrity for Development; Force des intègres pour le développement | | |
| Guinean Party for Progress and Development; Parti guinéen pour le progrès et le développement | | |
| Rally for Renaissance and Development; Rassemblement pour la renaissance et le développement | | |
| Party for Peace and Development; Parti pour la paix et le développement | | |
| Alliance for National Renewal; Alliance pour le renouveau national | | |
| Union of Democratic Forces; Union des forces démocratiques | | |
| Movement of Patriots for Development; Mouvement des patriotes pour le développement | | |
| Alliance for National Renewal; Alliance pour le renouveau national | | |
| New Generation for the Republic; Nouvelle génération pour la république | | |
| Guinea United for Development; Guinée unie pour le développement | | |
| Rally for a Prosperous Guinea; Rassemblement pour une guinée prospère | | |

=== Defunct ===
| Party | Leader | Ideology | Years active |
|---|---|---|---|
| Democratic Party of Guinea – African Democratic Rally; Parti démocratique de Guinée-Rassemblement démocratique africain | Ismael Gushein | African nationalism; African socialism; Pan-Africanism | 1947–2026 |
| Franco-Guinean Union; Union franco-guinéenne | | Pro-French colonialism | 1947–1954 |
| Guinean Progressive Union; Union progressiste guinéenne | | | 1958 |
| National Alliance for Progress; Alliance Nationale pour le Progrès | | | 2002–2026 |
| Rally of the Guinean People–Rainbow; Rassemblement du peuple de Guinée-Arc en ciel | Alpha Condé | Social democracy; Democratic socialism; Progressivism | 1960s/1992–2026 |
| Socialist Democracy of Guinea; Démocratie Socialiste de Guinée | Barry III | Socialism; Democratic socialism; Social democracy | 1954–1958 |
| Socialist Party of Guinea | | | |
| Union for the New Republic; Union pour la Nouvelle République | Mamadou Boye Bah | | 1990–1998 |
| Union for the Progress of Guinea; Union pour le Progrès de la Guinée | Jean-Marie Doré | | 1990–2026 |
| Union of Democratic Forces of Guinea; Union des forces démocratiques de Guinée | Cellou Dalein Diallo | Liberalism; Social liberalism | 1991–2026 |
| Union of Republican Forces; Union des Forces Républicaines | Sidya Touré | Liberalism | 1992–2026 |
| Unity and Progress Party; Parti de l'Unité et du Progrès | Elhadj Moussa Solano | | 1992–2026 |

== See also ==
- Politics of Guinea
- List of political parties by country
