= Politics of Guinea =

Politics of Guinea takes place in a framework of a presidential representative democratic republic, whereby the President of Guinea is both head of state and head of government of Guinea. Executive power is exercised by the government. Legislative power is vested in both the government and the National Assembly.

== History ==
=== Conté era (1984–2008) ===
A military dictatorship, led by then-Lt. Col. Lansana Conté and styling itself the Military Committee of National Recovery (CMRN), took control of Guinea in April 1984, shortly after the death of independent Guinea's first president, Sékou Touré. With Conté as president, the CMRN set about dismantling Touré's oppressive regime, abolishing the authoritarian constitution, dissolving the sole political party and its mass youth and women's organizations, and announcing the establishment of the Second Republic. The new government released all political prisoners and committed itself to the protection of human rights. In order to reverse the steady economic decline under Touré's rule, the CMRN reorganized the judicial system, decentralized the administration, promoted private enterprise, and encouraged foreign investment.

In 1990, Guineans approved by referendum a new constitution that inaugurated the Third Republic, and established a Supreme Court. In 1991, the CMRN was replaced by a mixed military and civilian body, the Transitional Council for National Recovery (CTRN), with Conté as president and a mandate to manage a five-year transition to full civilian rule. The CTRN drafted laws to create republican institutions and to provide for independent political parties, national elections, and freedom of the press. Political party activity was legalized in 1992, when more than 40 political parties were officially recognized for the first time.

In December 1993, Conté was elected to a 5-year term as president in the country's first multi-party elections, which were marred by irregularities and lack of transparency on the part of the government. In 1995, Conté's ruling PUP party won 76 of 114 seats in elections for the National Assembly amid opposition claims of irregularities and government tampering. In 1996, President Conté reorganized the government, appointing Sidya Touré to the revived post of Prime Minister and charging him with special responsibility for leading the government's economic reform program. In the early hours of 23 December 2008, Aboubacar Somparé, the President of the National Assembly, announced on television that Conté had died at 6:45pm local time on 22 December "after a long illness", without specifying the cause of death.

According to Somparé, Conté "hid his physical suffering" for years "in order to give happiness to Guinea." Conté had left the country for medical treatment on numerous occasions in the years preceding his death, and speculation about his health had long been widespread. Contrary to his usual practice, Conté did not appear on television to mark Tabaski earlier in December 2008, and this sparked renewed speculation, as well as concern about the possibility of violence in the event of his death. At around the same time, a newspaper published a photograph suggesting that Conté was in poor physical condition and having difficulty standing up. The editor of that newspaper was arrested and the newspaper was required to print a photograph in which Conté looked healthy.

According to the constitution, the President of the National Assembly was to assume the Presidency of the Republic in the event of a vacancy, and a new presidential election was to be held within 60 days. Somparé requested that the President of the Supreme Court, Lamine Sidimé, declare a vacancy in the Presidency and apply the constitution. Prime Minister Souaré and Diarra Camara, the head of the army, stood alongside Somparé during his announcement. The government declared 40 days of national mourning and Camara called on soldiers to remain calm.

=== Camara's 2008 coup and following ===
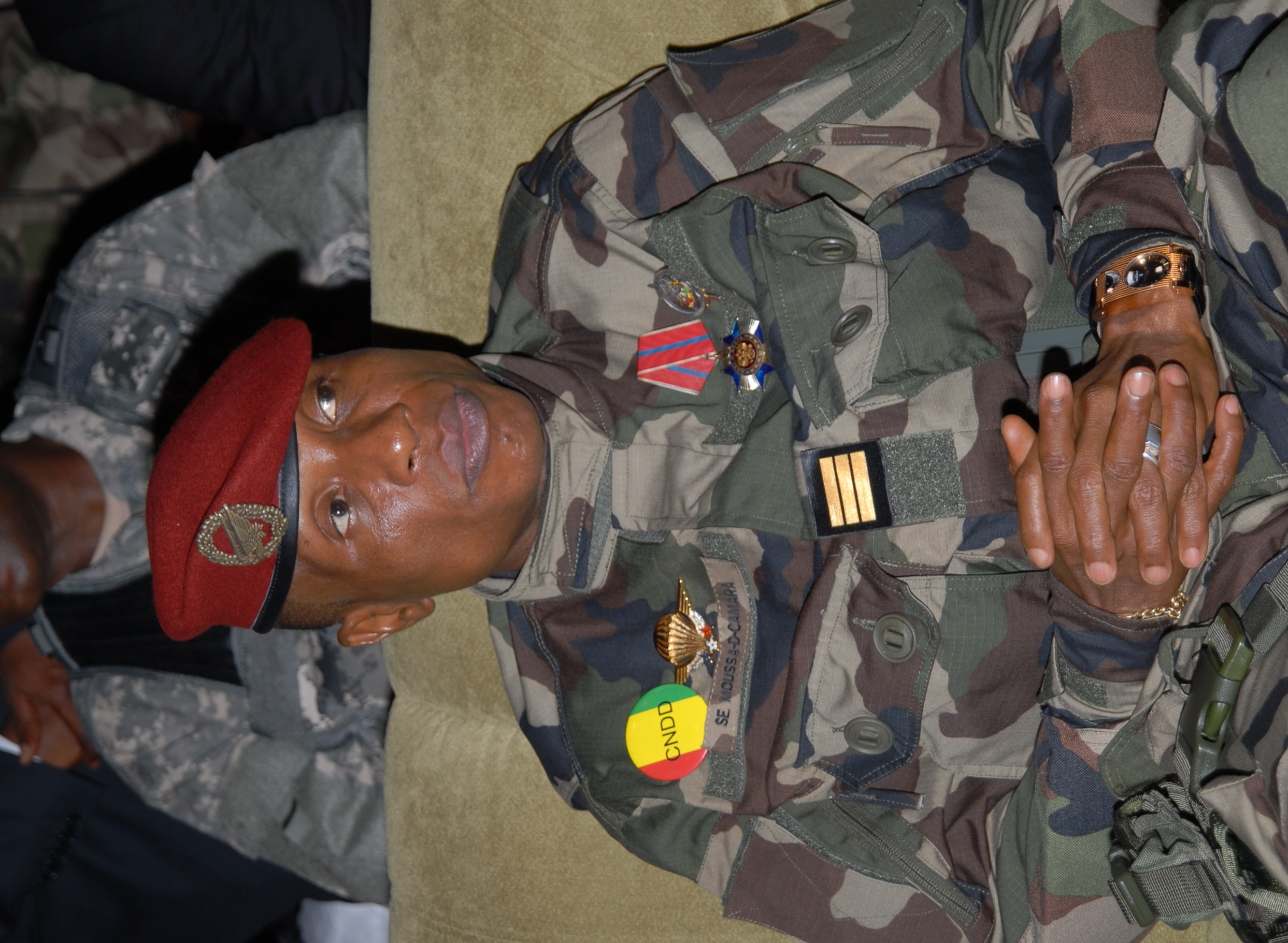
Captain Moussa Dadis Camara, who seized power in a military coup d'état in December 2008

Six hours after Somparé announced Conté's death, a statement was read on television announcing a military coup d'état. This statement, read by Captain Moussa Dadis Camara on behalf of a group called National Council for Democracy, said that "the government and the institutions of the Republic have been dissolved". The statement also announced the suspension of the constitution "as well as political and union activity".

On 27 September 2009, the day before planned demonstrations in the capital city Conakry, the government declared demonstrations illegal. Thousands of protestors defied the ban, assembling in a soccer stadium. 157 were left dead after the level of violence used by security forces escalated. Captain Moussa (Dadis) Camara told Radio France International on 28 September the shootings by members of his presidential guard were beyond his control. "Those people who committed those atrocities were uncontrollable elements in the military," he said. "Even I, as head of state in this very tense situation, cannot claim to be able to control those elements in the military."

On 3 December 2009 Captain Moussa Dadis Camara suffered a head wound in an attempted assassination in Conakry led by his aide-de-camp, Lieutenant Aboubacar Sidiki Diakité, who is known as Toumba. Captain Camara underwent surgery at a hospital in Morocco. Reports say Toumba's men opened fire on Captain Camara late Thursday at an army camp in the city of Conakry.

In a document released in 2010, an unknown source spoke with a U.S. diplomat and described the "ethnicization" of Guinea and the risk of conflict and violence like in Rwanda. He stated that Dadis Camara has recruited mercenaries from South Africa and Israel and assembled them, along with some of his own men, in Forecariah, in the ethnically Sussu region in the west of the country, while Dadis was from the Forest region to the east. His militia numbered 2,000-3,000 and was armed with weapons from Ukraine. The risk of conflict and destabilization threatened the entire region, he said.

After a meeting in Ouagadougou on 13 and 14 January, Camara, Konaté and Blaise Compaoré, President of Burkina Faso, produced a formal statement of twelve principles promising a return of Guinea to civilian rule within six months. It was agreed that the military would not contest the forthcoming elections. On 21 January 2010 the military junta appointed Jean-Marie Doré as Prime Minister of a six-month transition government, leading up to elections.

In July 2024, Camara was convicted alongside several military commanders for crimes against humanity. However, in early 2025, Camara was pardoned for health reasons by the then-current junta.

=== 2010 elections ===
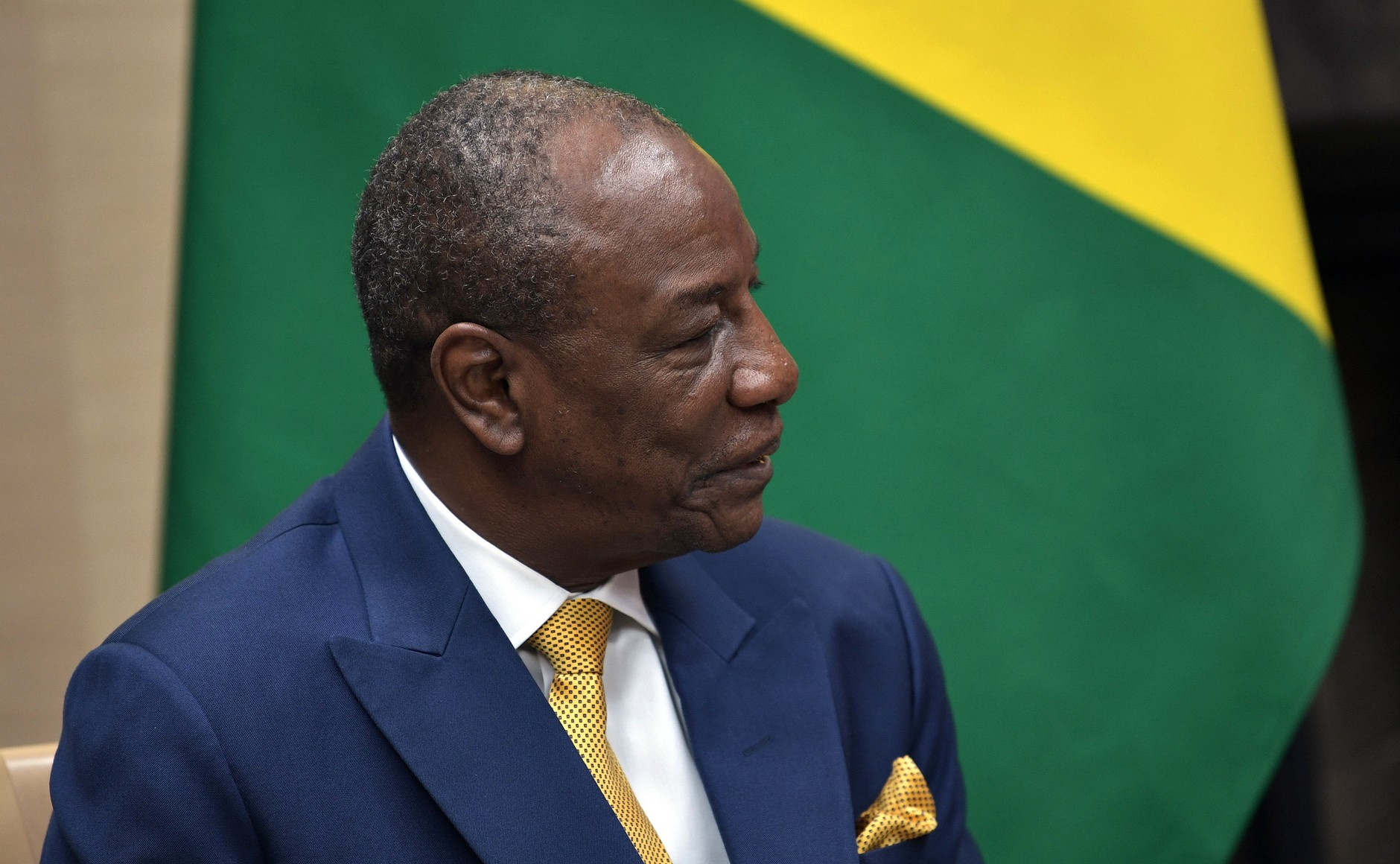
Alpha Conde became the first freely elected president in the country's history in 2010

The presidential election was set to take place on 27 June and 18 July 2010, it was held as being the first free and fair election since independence in 1958.

The first round took place normally on 27 June 2010 with ex Prime Minister Cellou Dalein Diallo and his rival Alpha Condé emerging as the two runners-up for the second round. However, due to allegations of electoral fraud, the second round of the election was postponed until 19 September 2010. A delay until 10 October was announced by the electoral commission (CENI), subject to approval by Sékouba Konaté. Yet another delay until 24 October was announced in early October. Elections were finally held on 7 November. Voter turnout was high, and the elections went relatively smoothly.

16 November 2010, Alpha Condé, the leader of the opposition party Rally of the Guinean People (RGP), was officially declared the winner of a 7 November run-off in Guinea's presidential election. He had promised to reform the security sector and review mining contracts if elected.

=== 2013 violence ===
In February 2013, the Guinean opposition party announced it would be stepping down from the electoral process due to a lack of transparency over the company used in registering voters. Calling on citizens to protest nationwide, the ensuing week saw multiple clashes between police and protesters, resulting in at least nine deaths, some of those due to live fire from security forces.

The protests were also a result of the previous months' political wrangling between Condé's administration and the opposition; minor protests were quelled on the street, and opposition supporters were arbitrarily arrested, prompting the resignation of two Guinean opposition ministers in September 2012. This month also saw the opposition parties announce their stepping down from the National Transitional Council, which is effectively an interim parliament, and that they would also boycott the national electoral commission. The president of the national electoral commission, Louceny Camara, also stepped down due to pressure from the opposition over his relationship with President Condé; Camara was rumoured to be his ally and a key figure in the president's rumoured attempts to pre-rig the legislative polls.

The week after the protest saw another minor clash between protesters and security forces after a march to mark the funerals of the deceased was dispersed by tear gas and gunfire.

On 7 March 2013, the government postponed the 12 May election date indefinitely until the political tension eased and preparations for free and fair elections could be established.

Despite the election postponement, President Condé ordered a crackdown on those responsible for the violence, and on 10 March, a Guinean court ordered opposition leaders to appear at a hearing scheduled for 14 March, in which they would be questioned for their role in organising the protests. Former Prime Minister Sidya Toure branded the summons as an "illegal procedure for what was an authorised march" and a "manipulation of justice for political ends".

=== 2020 elections and controversy ===
In October 2020, president Alpha Condé won presidential elections. Condé had been in power since 2010 and he won the third term. Opposition did not accept the results because of allegations of fraud. The president said a constitutional referendum in March 2020 allowed him to run despite a two-term limit. After the election there were violent protests across the country.

=== 2021 coup ===
Following a military coup on 5 September 2021 the government was dissolved, borders closed, constitution suspended and President Condé was arrested. On 1 October 2021 general Mamady Doumbouya was sworn in as Guinea's interim president after leading the coup.

=== Return to civilian rule ===
On 28 December 2025, a presidential election was held. Coup leader and incumbent president Mamady Doumbouya won this election with 86.72% of the vote, amidst allegations of unfair electoral practices by United Nations official Volker Türk and members of the opposition.

Shortly after Doumbouya's inauguration as civilian president in January 2026, the African Union lifted the sanctions it had imposed on Guinea following the 2021 coup. On 6 March 2026, the government unilaterally dissolved 40 political parties, including the three main opposition parties in the country (UFDG, RPG and UFR).

== Ethnic politics ==
President Alpha Condé derived support from Guinea's second-largest ethnic group, the Malinke. Guinea's opposition was backed by some of the Fula ethnic group (French: Peul; Fula: Fulɓe), who account for around 33.4 percent of the population.

== Executive branch ==
The president of Guinea is normally elected by popular vote for a five-year term; candidate must receive a majority of the votes cast to be elected president. The president governs Guinea, assisted by a Cabinet of 25 civilian ministers appointed by him to lead the government ministries of Guinea. The government administers the country through eight regions, 33 prefectures, over 100 subprefectures, and many districts (known as communes in Conakry and other large cities and villages or "quartiers" in the interior). District-level leaders are elected; the president appoints officials to all other levels of the highly centralized administration.

Between the 2010 Presidential Elections and 2021 coup the head of state was Alpha Condé. Following the 2021 coup he was replaced by Colonel Mamady Doumbouya acting as Chairman of the National Committee of Reconciliation and Development, a transitional military junta.

== Legislative branch ==
The National Assembly of Guinea, the country's legislative body, had not met for a long period of time since 2008 when it was dissolved after the military coup in December of that year. Elections have been postponed many times since 2007. In April 2012, President Condé postponed the elections indefinitely, citing the need to ensure that they were "transparent and democratic".

The legislative elections took place on 28 September 2013 and President Alpha Conde's party, the Rally of the Guinean People, won with 53 seats.

In February 2022, five months after the 2021 military coup, a National Transitional Council headed by former lawmaker Dansa Kurouma and consisting of 81 members was established as a transitional parliament.

== Administrative divisions of Guinea ==
Guinea is divided into seven administrative regions and subdivided into thirty-three prefectures. The national capital, Conakry, ranks as a special zone. The regions are Boké, Faranah, Kankan, Kindia, Labé, Mamou, Nzérékoré and Conakry.

== Political parties and elections ==
=== Presidential elections ===
Candidate	Party	Votes	%
Alpha Condé	Rally of the Guinean People	2,284,827	57.84
Cellou Dalein Diallo	Union of Democratic Forces of Guinea	1,242,362	31.45
Sidya Touré	Union of Republican Forces	237,549	6.01
Faya Millimono	Liberal Bloc	54,718	1.39
Papa Koly Kourouma	Generations for Reconciliation, Union, and Prosperity	51,750	1.31
Lansana Kouyaté	Party of Hope for National Development	45,962	1.16
Georges Gandhi Tounkara	Guinean Union for Democracy and Development	19,840	0.50
Marie Madeleine Dioubaté	Guinea Ecologists Party	13,214	0.33
Total		3,950,222	100.00
Valid votes		3,950,222	95.52
Invalid/blank votes		185,091	4.48
Total votes		4,135,313	100.00
Registered voters/turnout		6,042,634	68.44
Source: Constitutional Court

=== Parliamentary elections ===
The elections were boycotted by the main opposition parties. As a result, President Condé's party won a supermajority of seats.

Party	Proportional			Constituency			Total seats	+/–
Party	Votes	%	Seats	Votes	%	Seats	Total seats	+/–
Rally of the Guinean People–Rainbow	1,591,650	55.27	42	2,417,836	89.05	37	79	+26
Guinean Democratic Union	151,576	5.26	4	56,085	2.07	0	4	New
Guinean Popular Democratic Movement	113,702	3.95	3	74,343	2.74	0	3	New
New Democratic Forces	76,612	2.66	2	4,711	0.17	1	3	New
Union for Progress and Renewal	76,512	2.66	2	14,597	0.54	0	2	1
Rally for the Integrated Development of Guinea	76,412	2.65	2	23,901	0.88	0	2	1
Union of the Forces of Change	76,208	2.65	2				2	New
Democratic Alternation for Reform–Constructive Opposition Bloc	76,188	2.65	2				2	New
Guinea for Democracy and Balance	76,012	2.64	2	31,671	1.17	0	2	New
Guinean Party for Renaissance and Progress	39,706	1.38	1				1	0
Afia Party	39,126	1.36	1				1	+1
Civic Generation	39,106	1.36	1				1	+1
Forces of Integrity for Development	39,106	1.36	1				1	New
Guinean Party for Progress and Development	38,430	1.33	1				1	+1
Rally for Renaissance and Development	38,310	1.33	1	10,608	0.39	0	1	New
Party for Peace and Development	38,176	1.33	1				1	New
Alliance for National Renewal	37,906	1.32	1				1	New
Union of Democratic Forces	37,900	1.32	1	13,923	0.51	0	1	+1
Movement of Patriots for Development	29,996	1.04	1				1	New
Alliance for National Renewal	29,800	1.03	1				1	New
New Generation for the Republic	29,800	1.03	1	12,917	0.48	0	1	0
Guinea United for Development	29,140	1.01	1				1	0
PDG–RDA	27,640	0.96	1				1	+1
Rally for a Prosperous Guinea	27,400	0.95	1				1	+1
Democratic Party of Conservatives	12,324	0.43	0	16,441	0.61	0	0	New
Guinean Party of the Renaissance	10,204	0.35	0				0	New
Union for the Defence of Republican Interests	7,536	0.26	0	24,046	0.89	0	0	New
Guinean Rally for Unity and Development	5,494	0.19	0				0	0
Rally for the Republic	5,422	0.19	0				0	New
Pan-African Party of Guinea	2,550	0.09	0				0	New
Party New Vision				8,038	0.30	0	0	–
Alliance of Forces for Change				4,698	0.17	0	0	–
Party of the National Defense for Development				1,333	0.05	0	0	–
Total	2,879,944	100.00	76	2,715,148	100.00	38	114	0
Valid votes	2,879,944	95.80		2,715,148	91.48			
Invalid/blank votes	126,111	4.20		252,939	8.52			
Total votes	3,006,055	100.00		2,968,087	100.00			
Registered voters/turnout	5,179,600	58.04		5,179,600	57.30			
Source: CENI, CC

== International organization participation ==
Guinea's membership in the African Union was suspended after the coup.

- Agency for the French-Speaking Community,
- African, Caribbean, and Pacific Group of States,
- African Development Bank,
- Customs Cooperation Council,
- Economic Commission for Africa,
- Economic Community of West African States,
- Food and Agriculture Organization,
- Group of 77,
- International Bank for Reconstruction and Development,
- International Civil Aviation Organization,
- International Criminal Court,
- International Confederation of Free Trade Unions,
- International Red Cross and Red Crescent Movement,
- International Development Association,
- Islamic Development Bank,
- International Fund for Agricultural Development,
- International Finance Corporation,
- International Federation of Red Cross and Red Crescent Societies,
- International Labour Organization,
- International Monetary Fund,
- International Maritime Organization,
- International Telecommunications Satellite Organization,
- International Criminal Police Organization,
- International Olympic Committee,
- International Organization for Migration (observer),
- International Organization for Standardization (correspondent),
- International Telecommunication Union,
- United Nations Mission for the Referendum in Western Sahara,
- Non-Aligned Movement,
- Organization of African Unity,
- Organisation of Islamic Cooperation,
- Organisation for the Prohibition of Chemical Weapons,
- United Nations,
- United Nations Conference on Trade and Development,
- United Nations Educational, Scientific, and Cultural Organization,
- United Nations Industrial Development Organization,
- Universal Postal Union,
- World Confederation of Labour,
- World Federation of Trade Unions,
- World Health Organization,
- World Intellectual Property Organization,
- World Meteorological Organization,
- World Tourism Organization,
- World Trade Organization

== See also ==
- Moussa Dadis Camara#Christmas coup
- Komara government
