= 1993 Guinean presidential election =

← 1982	19 December 1993	1998 →
- Registered: 2,850,394
- Turnout: 78.46%
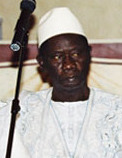

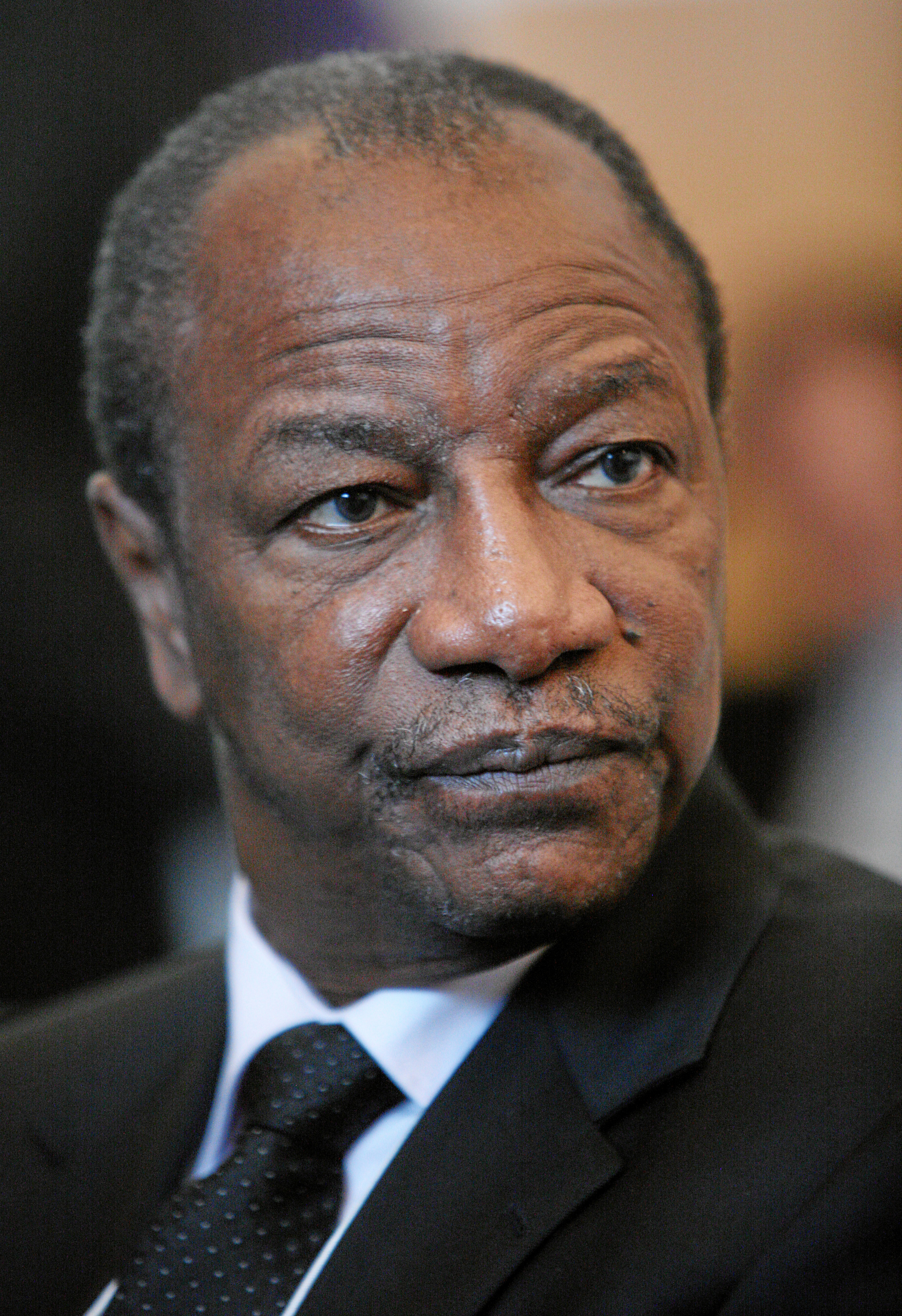

Nominee	Lansana Conté	Alpha Condé
Party	PUP	RPG
Popular vote	1,077,017	407,221
Percentage	51.71%	19.55%
Nominee	Mamadou Boye Bah	Siradiou Diallo
Party	UNR	PRP
Popular vote	278,638	247,100
Percentage	13.38%	11.86%
President before election
Lansana Conté
PUP
Elected President
Lansana Conté
PUP

Presidential elections were held in Guinea on 19 December 1993. They were the first since the country returned to multi-party politics in 1990, and the first to feature more than one candidate. The result was a victory for Lansana Conté of the Unity and Progress Party, who received 52% of the vote. Voter turnout was 78%.

== Results ==
Candidate	Party	Votes	%
Lansana Conté	Unity and Progress Party	1,077,017	51.71
Alpha Condé	Rally of the Guinean People	407,221	19.55
Mamadou Boye Bah	Union for the New Republic	278,638	13.38
Siradiou Diallo	Renewal and Progress Party	247,100	11.86
Facinet Touré	National Union for the Prosperity of Guinea	29,275	1.41
Jean Marie Doré	Union for the Progress of Guinea	19,007	0.91
Mansour Kaba	Dyama Party	12,886	0.62
Ismael Gushein	Democratic Party of Guinea	11,696	0.56
Total		2,082,840	100.00
Valid votes		2,082,840	93.13
Invalid/blank votes		153,586	6.87
Total votes		2,236,426	100.00
Registered voters/turnout		2,850,394	78.46
Source: African Elections Database
