= Union for Progress =

Union for Progress may refer to:

- Union for Progress (Congo), a political party in the Republic of the Congo
- Union for Progress (Saint Martin), a political party in Saint Martin
- Union for Progress and Renewal (Guinea), a political party in Guinea
- Union for the Progress of Guinea, a political party in Guinea
- Union for Progress (Andorra), a political party in Andorra
