= Aboubacar Somparé =

Guinean politician (1944–2017)

President of the National Assembly of Guinea
- In office 2002–2008

Secretary-General of the Unity and Progress Party
- In office 1995–2002

Guinea's Ambassador to France
- In office 1978–1984

Personal details
- Born: Aboubacar Somparé; 31 August 1944; Dakonta, French Guinea
- Died: 2 November 2017 (aged 73); Ratoma, Conakry, Guinea
- Political party: Unity and Progress Party

El Hajj Aboubacar Somparé (N'Ko: ߊߓߎߓߊߞߊߙ ߛߐ߲߬ߔߊ߬ߙߋ߫; 31 August 1944 – 2 November 2017) was a Guinean politician who was President of the National Assembly of Guinea from 2002 to 2008. He was previously Guinea's Ambassador to France from 1978 to 1984 and was Secretary-General of the Unity and Progress Party (PUP) from 1995 to 2002.

== Political career until 2002 ==
Somparé was born in Dakonta, located in Boké Prefecture. He was the Regional Director of Education in Labé from August 1970 to September 1973, Director-General of Secondary Education at the Ministry of Pre-University Education from September 1973 to December 1976, and Director-General of the Information Services from December 1976 to February 1978. Subsequently, he was posted to Paris as Guinea's Ambassador to France from February 1978 to September 1984; after his return from Paris, he was an advisor at the Ministry of Administrative Reform and the Civil Service from November 1984 to July 1986. He was then Administrator of the Palace of Nations (the presidential palace) in Conakry from July 1986 to May 1987 and Rector of the University of Conakry from May 1987 to May 1989.

From August 1989 to October 1990, Somparé was the National Coordinator of the Adjustment Programme for the Education Sector; he was then Secretary-General of the Ministry of the Interior and Decentralization from October 1990 to March 1992. Later, he was elected to the National Assembly in the June 1995 parliamentary election, and at that time he became Secretary-General of the PUP as well as President of the PUP/PCN Parliamentary Group. He remained in those positions until 2002.

== President of the National Assembly ==
After Somparé was re-elected to the National Assembly in the June 2002 parliamentary election, he was chosen by President Lansana Conté to become President of the National Assembly. Conté had some difficulty obtaining the necessary support for Somparé among parliamentary deputies, and for that reason he delayed the opening of the National Assembly. Ultimately he was elected as President of the National Assembly at a special session on 23 September 2002, receiving the support of 87 of the 106 deputies who voted.

Although Somparé held a key post as President of the National Assembly, it was believed that the ailing President Conté disliked him; he was also reportedly unpopular with the army and much of the PUP leadership. During that time, Somparé was apparently engaged in a rivalry with PUP Secretary-General Sékou Konaté.

Somparé's position as Conté's constitutional successor concerned some, who believed he would be unwilling to surrender power if he ever obtained it. On the other hand, it was noted that Somparé enjoyed little popularity with any group and therefore might lack the political base to perpetuate himself in power. In early 2006, when Conté left Guinea to receive medical treatment in Switzerland, Somparé reportedly met with military officers to discuss the presidential succession; Conté was said to be infuriated by that move.

Speaking to Jeune Afrique in 2008, Somparé said that he thought Conté, who was known to be in extremely poor health, would not be a candidate for re-election in the planned 2010 presidential election. He also addressed the failure to hold a parliamentary election on schedule (as the parliamentary term began in 2002, it would normally have expired in 2007), saying that an election should only be held if it would "contribute to strengthen the social fabric and democracy" and not if it would "contribute to disorder".

== Events of December 2008 ==
In the early hours of 23 December 2008, Somparé announced on television that President Conté had died "after a long illness" on the previous day. According to the constitution, the President of the National Assembly was to assume the Presidency of the Republic in the event of a vacancy, and a new presidential election was to be held within 60 days. Somparé requested that the President of the Supreme Court, Lamine Sidimé, declare a vacancy in the Presidency and apply the constitution. Prime Minister Ahmed Tidiane Souaré and Diarra Camara, the head of the army, stood alongside Somparé during his announcement. Somparé later said in an interview that Sidimé initially could not be reached after Conté's death, and that when Sidimé subsequently arrived at the People's Palace to discuss the situation, he delayed taking the necessary legal steps on the "pretext" that he could not arrange a ceremony until the next day.

Six hours after Somparé announced Conté's death, a statement was read on television announcing a military coup d'état. This statement, read on behalf of a junta called the National Council for Democracy and Development (CNDD), said that "the government and the institutions of the republic have been dissolved"; it also announced that the constitution was suspended. Somparé went into hiding and told the press that the newly established junta was trying to find him; he also urged the international community to "mobilise to prevent the military from interrupting the democratic process". After a few days in hiding, he emerged on 27 December to attend a meeting of political and social representatives that was called by the junta and held at the Alpha Yaya Diallo military camp.

== Political career (2009–2017) ==
With the PUP out of power for the first time in its history, in late January 2009 a "refoundation" movement was reportedly established within the PUP that intended to remove supporters of Somparé and his old rival, Sékou Konaté, from the party leadership. Amidst speculation that the future of the party was in doubt, Somparé and Konaté reconciled in March 2009.

Somparé was largely silent in public in the year that followed the coup. Unlike many other Conté officials, he was left alone by the CNDD junta. At a PUP meeting on 6 March 2010, Somparé criticized the opposition parties that chose to embrace the coup; he argued that their initial acceptance of the coup demonstrated that they were "not sincere" in their claimed commitment to democracy and constitutional governance. Somparé was then chosen as the PUP's candidate for the June 2010 presidential election at a party congress on 27–28 March 2010.

== Death ==
Somparé died on 2 November 2017.
