= 2008 Guinean coup d'état =

Military coup shortly after President Lansana Conté died

On 23 December 2008, a coup d'état occurred in Guinea, shortly after the death of long-time president Lansana Conté. A junta called the National Council for Democracy and Development (French: Conseil National de la Démocratie et du Development, CNDD), headed by Captain Moussa Dadis Camara, seized power and announced that it planned to rule the country for two years prior to a new presidential election. Camara did indeed step down after Alpha Condé was elected in the 2010 election.

== Death of Conté ==
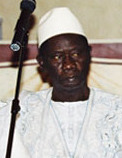
The coup took place just hours after the death of Lansana Conté.

In the early hours of 23 December 2008, Aboubacar Somparé, the President of the National Assembly, announced on television that Conté had died at 6:45 pm local time the previous day "after a long illness." While Somparé did not name the particular illness, sources reported that Conté had chronic diabetes and leukemia. According to the Constitution, the president of the National Assembly is to assume the presidency in the event of a vacancy, and a new presidential election is to be held within 60 days. Somparé requested that the president of the Supreme Court, Lamine Sidimé, declare a vacancy in the Presidency and apply the Constitution. Prime Minister Ahmed Tidiane Souaré and General Diarra Camara, the head of the army, stood alongside Somparé during his announcement. Declaring 40 days of national mourning for Conté, Souaré urged "calm and restraint". He told the army to secure the borders and maintain calm within the country "in homage to the memory of the illustrious late leader".

Government officials met at the People's Palace, seat of the National Assembly, in the early hours of 23 December. Prime Minister Souaré, Somparé, the president of the Supreme Court, and military leaders were present.

Speaking to Radio France Internationale after Conté's death, opposition leader Jean-Marie Doré of the Union for the Progress of Guinea stressed that the institutions of state must "be able to work to prevent unnecessary disorder in Guinea which would add to the current difficult situation".

== Announcement of coup d'état ==
Six hours after Somparé announced Conté's death, a statement was read on state radio announcing a military coup d'état. This statement, read by Captain Moussa Dadis Camara on behalf of a group called the National Council for Democracy and Development (CNDD), said that "the government and the institutions of the Republic have been dissolved." The statement also announced the suspension of the constitution "as well as political and union activity." According to Captain Camara, the coup was necessary due to Guinea's "deep despair" amidst rampant poverty and corruption, and he said that the existing institutions were "incapable of resolving the crises which have been confronting the country." Furthermore, Camara said that someone from the military would become president, while a civilian would be appointed as prime minister at the head of a new government that would be ethnically balanced. The National Council for Democracy and Development would, according to Camara, include 26 officers as well as six civilians.

Reporting from Conakry at the time of the coup announcement, Alhassan Sillah of the BBC said that the situation in the city was "unusually quiet" and that he had not seen any soldiers. Later in the day, several tanks were seen in the city.

Following Camara's announcement, Souaré said the government and state institutions were intact. According to Souaré, he did not know who was behind the coup attempt, but he said that he was "sure that they will see reason. They have not used force. There has been no threat against anybody." Somparé, meanwhile, called the coup attempt "a setback for our country" and expressed hope that it would not succeed. He argued that most soldiers were still loyal to the government.

It was reported that soldiers at the Alfa Yaya Diallo military camp had chosen a lieutenant-colonel, Sékouba Konaté, as leader of the coup attempt, although some soldiers objected because they believed a higher-ranking officer should have been chosen. The chief of the armed forces, General Diarra Camara, said that the coup plotters represented only a minority of the army. In the afternoon of 23 December, amidst confusion about who was in control of the country, Gen. Camara asked that the soldiers "at least wait until after [Conté's] funeral", while also stating that he was not trying to prevent anyone's ambitions.

On 23 December, both the office of the Prime Minister and the Little Palace, Conté's former residence, were reported to be under the control of the coup leaders. According to Somparé, the leaders of the coup held a meeting to choose an interim leader for the country late on 23 December; he said that Moussa Camara, Sékouba Konaté, and Toto Camara were considered candidates for the position. The composition of the CNDD was announced late on 23 December; it included 32 members, 26 of whom were officers and six of whom were civilians.

In an interview with Guineenews on 23 December, opposition leader Cellou Dalein Diallo said that he believed the constitution should be respected, while also saying that he believed a new presidential election should be held together with the already planned parliamentary election on 31 May 2009.

== Consolidation of CNDD authority ==
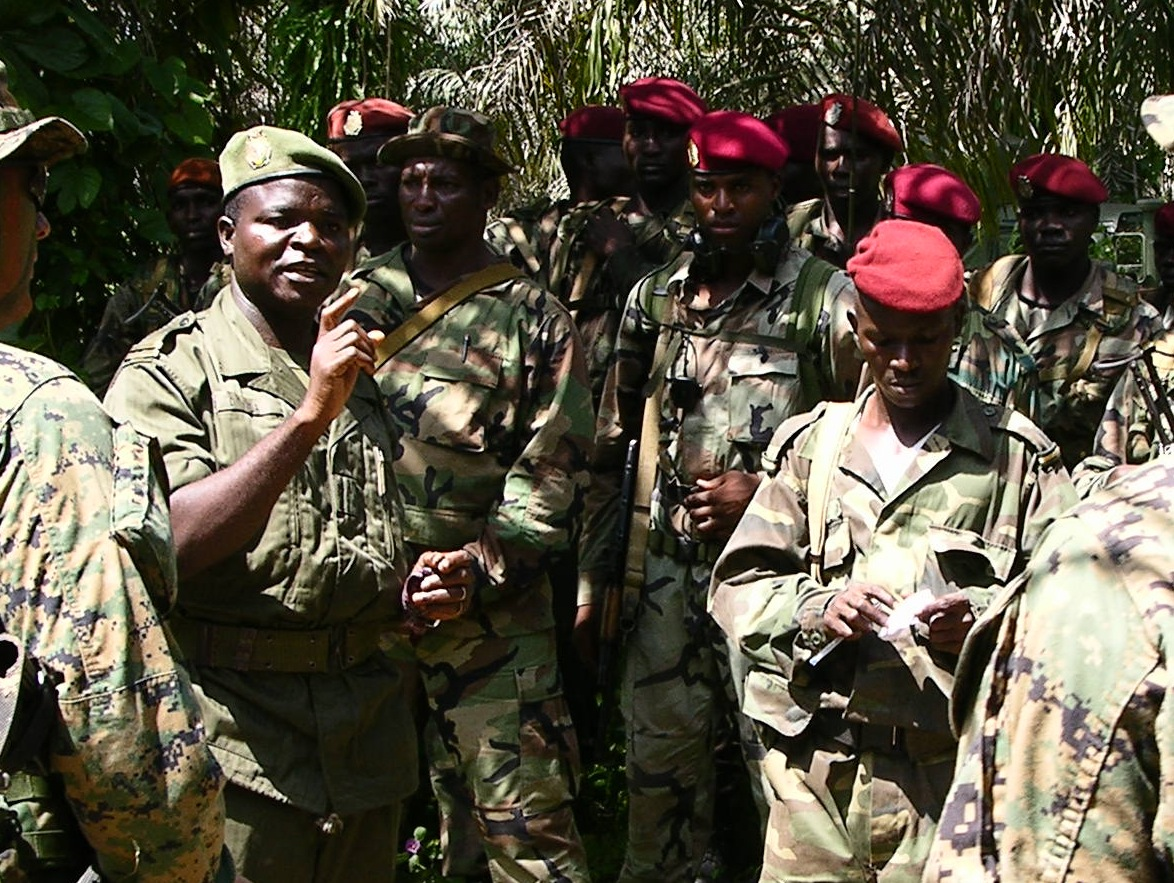
Guinean officers in 2005. 1st Lt. David Haba (pictured left) became in 2009 a special envoy of the CNDD to foreign leaders.

A statement was read over the radio on 24 December announcing that Captain Moussa Dadis Camara was the president of the CNDD. Later in the day, Camara and thousands of soldiers loyal to him paraded through the city, surrounded by large numbers of civilian supporters. According to Camara, he "came to see if the terrain is favorable to us", declaring that the large crowds indicated that the people were indeed supportive of the coup. Also on 24 December, Camara said in a radio broadcast that the CNDD did not want to stay in power indefinitely and that it intended to lead the country for two years, promising "credible and transparent presidential elections by the end of December 2010". This contradicted an earlier statement promising an election within the constitutionally mandated period of 60 days.

The CNDD declared an 8 pm to 6:30 am nationwide curfew, although it said that the curfew would not be implemented until 26 December to avoid interfering with the Christian celebration of Christmas. The extent of the CNDD's control remained unclear on 24 December; although Prime Minister Souaré had gone into hiding, he insisted that the government had not been toppled. Souaré described Camara as "an unknown captain [who] doesn't control the army" and argued again that most troops were loyal, while attributing the "disorder" to "one little group".

Shortly after the CNDD ordered all members of the government and army officers to go to the Alpha Yaya Diallo military camp within 24 hours, with the threat of "a sweep of the entire national territory" if they did not. Prime Minister Souaré went to the camp and turned himself in on 25 December, together with all the members of his government except for two ministers who were, according to Souaré, on official missions abroad. Camara met with Souaré and stressed that the CNDD was now in power, but he said that Souaré and his government could "go back to business". During the meeting, Souaré lamented the death of Conté and expressed his government's willingness to serve under the CNDD, pointing out that his government was composed of technocrats, not politicians. He also addressed Camara as "President".

Speaking on the radio on 25 December, Camara said that he did not plan to run for President at the end of the two year transitional period. He also declared that the CNDD was not susceptible to bribes. According to Camara, people had "start[ed] to show up with bags of money to try to corrupt us. They've tried to give money to our wives and cars to our children." He warned that he would "personally go after anyone who tries to corrupt us". Camara also said that Conté's funeral on 26 December (several days late) would be "grandiose", and he expressed disapproval in describing the lack of proper care for Conté's body.

Conté's funeral was held on 26 December, with over 20,000 in attendance at the national stadium in Conakry. Leaders of neighboring countries were present for the funeral, although Camara was not. General Mamadouba Toto Camara of the CNDD said at the funeral that "we pray God to give us the courage to continue [Conté's] work of tolerance and peace for the welfare of Guinea". He was then taken to his hometown of Moussayah for burial.

Camara held a large "informational meeting" at the Alfa Yaya Diallo military base on 27 December; about 1,000 people representing various groups were present, including Somparé, the key opposition leaders Alpha Condé and Sidya Touré, and the trade union leader Rabiatou Serah Diallo. At the meeting, Camara discussed his plans to renegotiate mining contracts and fight corruption. He said that all gold mining had already been halted for the time being. Camara also told the opposition and union leaders that they could propose a prime minister. Condé said on that occasion that the members of the CNDD junta were "patriots", and his party, the Rally of the Guinean People (RPG), subsequently expressed its willingness to participate in a government under the CNDD. Sidya Touré gave a positive assessment of the situation and said that "we will discuss the program and timetable for the transition and we will ensure that the military keep their promises."

Although the CNDD's curfew was enforced on 26 December, the junta decided to lift the curfew beginning on 27 December in order to encourage "a climate of peace". At around the same time, AFP reported the retirement of 22 senior military officers who had reached retirement age. The retired officers included General Diarra Camara, the army's chief of staff, who opposed the coup. Two officers were appointed to key positions on 28 December: Captain Kelety Faro as Minister Secretary-General at the Presidency and General Mamadouba Toto Camara as Minister of Security and Civil Protection. Also, Sékouba Konaté was appointed as Minister of Defense.

On 29 December, soldiers forcefully entered the compound of Mamadou Sylla—a wealthy businessman who had been an ally and close personal friend of Lansana Conté—and told Sylla to relinquish the keys to six SUV vehicles that they said were owned by the state. Sylla did so, but he complained that force was not necessary and said that the vehicles had been part of a contract between his company and the military.

The CNDD appointed Kabine Komara, a banker working in Egypt at the African Export-Import Bank, as prime minister on 30 December 2008. In a television speech on 1 January 2009, Camara said that the coup had prevented Guinea from "tumbling into ethnic warfare". According to Camara, Somparé was not a legitimate constitutional successor because his mandate as President of the National Assembly had legally expired, and he said that if Somparé had taken office, there would have been "incalculable consequences".

About 20 soldiers searched the home of opposition leader and former prime minister Cellou Dalein Diallo on 1 January, while holding Diallo and his family at gunpoint. According to Diallo, the search was based on suspicions that Diallo had weapons and mercenaries and was planning another coup, but he said that the soldiers did not take anything from his home. A junta delegation met with Diallo on 2 January and condemned the search, saying that "uncontrollable elements out to hurt the junta" were to blame and that Camara and the CNDD had nothing to do with it.

On 5 January 2009, Camara stated that both legislative and presidential elections would be held by the end of 2009, a year earlier than originally announced.

Camara, acting on the recommendation of Prime Minister Komara, appointed a new government on 14 January 2009. The government was composed of soldiers and technocrats and did not include any political parties. The government included 27 ministers and two secretaries of state.

Colonel Aboubacar Sidiki Camara was sworn in as Permanent Secretary to the CNDD on 26 January 2009. Contrary to the wishes of CNDD President Camara, he was unwilling to postpone his swearing-in, and he also requested the release of officers who were closely associated with Conté. He was promptly arrested later on 26 January; CNDD member Biro Condé was also reportedly arrested at that time. CNDD President Camara said on 27 January that Aboubacar Sidiki Camara had been dismissed from his post as Permanent Secretary due to negligence. He was released from detention on 28 January.

== International reactions ==
- The African Union said it would hold an emergency meeting over the situation. Peace and Security Commissioner Ramtane Lamamra said, "If the army coup is confirmed, it is a flagrant violation of the constitution and of African legality which absolutely forbids unconstitutional changes of government". On 29 December 2008, the African Union suspended Guinea from the organization "until the return of constitutional order in that country", and it demanded that constitutional government be restored within six months.
- Canada issued a statement which read, in part, that it "strongly condemns the attempted coup in Guinea and calls on all parties to fully respect the Constitution and the rule of law for the benefit of the people of Guinea, who have already suffered for too long" and "...appeals for calm and restraint."
- The Economic Community of West African States (ECOWAS) initially warned that Guinea could be suspended from the organization if the military took power. Later in December, ECOWAS said that it could not tolerate coups and it urged that the junta's planned transition be shorter than two years.
- United Nations Secretary General Ban Ki-moon, noting Conté's contribution to peace and the unity of Guinea and the stability of West Africa, commended Guinea's aid to refugees from strife in the surrounding region. He appealed for calm, for an orderly transition under Guinea's Constitution, and exhorted the Guinean armed forces to respect democracy.
- The European Union condemned the coup and called on Guinea's military and government to ensure a peaceful leadership transition. The EU called on political and army leaders to "respect constitutional measures to ensure a peaceful transition" of power through elections.
- Senegal's President Abdoulaye Wade urged the international community to recognise the military junta headed by Moussa Dadis Camara. According to Wade, Camara had asked him to be his spokesman to the world, and Wade said that "I call on all countries, the European Union, and in particular France, not to throw the first stone, but to take this group at their word" and that the "captain asked me to be his interpreter to Guineans, to the opposition, to ECOWAS, to the African Union, the European Union, the United States, the World Bank and international institutions". Wade also supported the promised elections and said that "This is the first time that the military has said, 'We'll organise elections and return to our barracks'".
- The United States expressed hope for "a peaceful and democratic transition". A spokesperson said "We are working with our partners in the region and other countries in the region and the African Union to encourage the institutions in Guinea to take all steps to ensure a peaceful and democratic transition".
- On January 5, 2009, Foreign Minister Ojo Maduekwe warned that Nigeria would have no relations with the military regime and that any other African Union member who recognized the coup's leaders as the government would be neglecting the organization's commitment to democracy.

== See also ==
- 2008 Guinean military unrest
- 2021 Guinean coup d'état
- Komara government
