= Mamadou Boye Bah =

Guinean politician (1930–2009)

Mamadou Boye Bah (1 April 1930 – 26 May 2009) was a Guinean political figure and economist and was one of the leading opponents of the presidents Sékou Touré and Lansana Conté.

Bah had originally worked in the Touré government in the early 1960s and in the late 1960s worked for the World Bank in Conakry. However, in 1969 he was arrested for allegedly conspiring against the president Sékou Touré and was sent into exile.

When Touré died in 1984, Bah returned to Guinea and formed the Union for the New Republic and become active in the opposition against the military backed government of Lansana Conté. He was presidential candidate for the UNR in the 1993 presidential elections and promised to pursue economic and educational development. In the end he received 13% of the vote. In the 1990s his UNR party became affiliated with the Renewal and Progress Party led by Siradiou Diallo as they both shared a distrust of General Conté's government. In 2001, approaching the constitutional referendum, Bah formed a coalition party the Movement against the Referendum and for a Political Alternative (MOMAD) and demanded a boycott of the elections as he believed the process was plagued with corruption and appealed to other nations for assistance.

In 2002, his party didn't share the proposal of boycotting the legislative elections, so he quit the UNR and joined the Union of Democratic Forces of Guinea.
