= Amara Kadjani Coumbassa =

Guinean politician

Member of the mines and industry commission

Member of parliament
- In office April 2020 – September 2021

Personal details
- Party: Rally of the Guinean People

Amara Kadjani Coumbassa is a Guinean politician and member of parliament. He was the MP from April 2020 to September 2021. He is a member of the mines and industry commission of the 9th legislative of the Republic of Guinea under the presidency Alpha Condé.
