= Union for the New Republic (disambiguation) =

Union for the New Republic may refer to:

- Union for the New Republic, defunct political party in France.
- Union for the New Republic, political party in Gabon.
- Union for the New Republic, defunct political party in Guinea.
- Democratic Union for the New Republic, dissolved political party in Italy.
