= Komara government =

The Komara government was the government of Guinea which took power after the December 2008 Guinean coup d'état under the direction of the National Council for Democracy and Development junta. This government ended on 26 January 2010 when Jean-Marie Doré formed a transitional government to oversee the country's first democratic elections, which were completed in November 2010.

== Members ==
The coup was carried out in December 2008 by the National Council for Democracy and Development following the death of the long serving president, Lansana Conté. The council was headed by army Captain Moussa Dadis Camara. On 30 December 2008, Camara appointed the technocrat Kabiné Komara as Prime Minister.

On 14 January, a cabinet of 28 ministers was announced:

Minister	Name	Role in CNDD
Security & Civil Protection	Gen Mamadouba Toto Camara	1st Vice-president
Defense	Gen Sekouba Konaté	
Construction, Development and Public Works	Boubacar Barry	
Secretary-General of the Presidency	Keletigui Faro	
Private sector planning & promotion	Mamadouba Max Bangoura	
Mines & Energy	Mahmoud Thiam	
Foreign Affairs	Alexandre Cécé Loua	
Administration & Political affairs	Dr Frédéric Kolié	
Economy and Finance	Capt. Mamadou Sandé	
Education	Hadja Aicha Bah	
Universities & Scientific Research	Dr Alpha Kabiné Camara	
Agriculture	Abdouramane Sanoh (resigned 2009-10-12)	
Justice	Col. Siba Nolamou	
Commerce & Industry	Commd. Korka Diallo	
Environment	Papa Koly Kourouma	
Telecommunications & IT	Col. Mathurin Bangoura	
Fisheries	Raymond Ounouted	
African Integration	Abdoul Aziz Bah	
Employment & Administrative Reform	Dr Alpha Diallo (resigned 2009-10-15)	
Health	Col. Abdoulaye Cherif Diaby	
Transport	Mamadi Kaba	
Tourism		
Audit, Transparency & Good Governance	Joseph Kandouno	
Women & Children	Hadja Makoura Sylla	
Information & Culture	Justin Morel Junior (resigned 2009-10-15)	
Youth, Sport and Youth Employment	Col. Fodeba Touré	
Decentralisation and local development	Naby Diakité	
Secretary-General in charge of special services against Drugs and Organised Crime	Capt. Moussa Diokoro Camara	
Secretary of State in charge of public works	Mamadi Kallo	
