= List of prime ministers of Guinea =

Prime Minister of the Republic of Guinea
- Premier ministre de la République de Guinée
- Coat of arms of Guinea

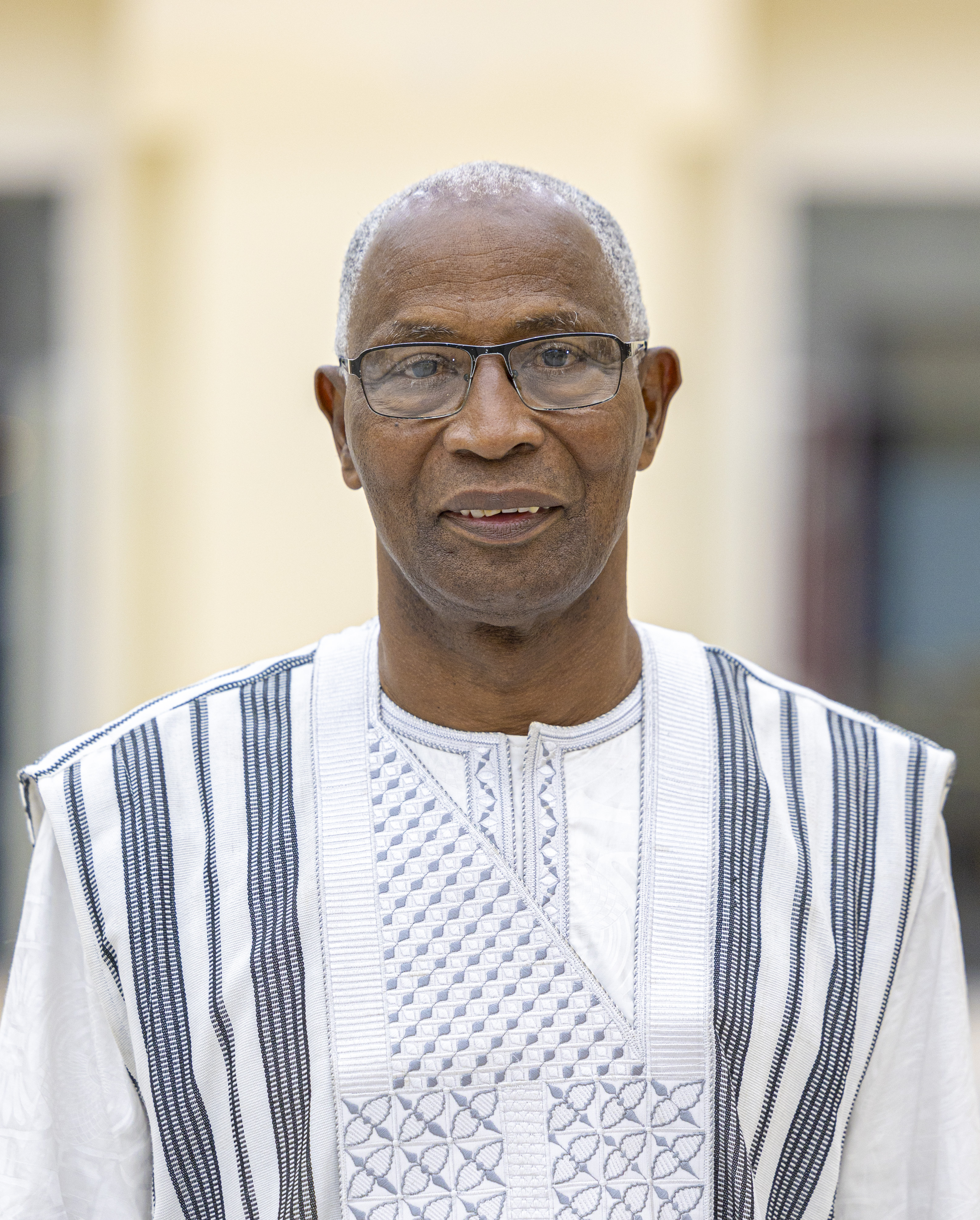
- Incumbent; Bah Oury since 28 February 2024
- Appointer: Mamady Doumbouya, as President of Guinea
- Inaugural holder: Louis Lansana Beavogui
- Formation: 26 April 1972; 54 years ago
- Website: primature.gov.gn

This article lists the prime ministers of Guinea, since the establishment of the office of Prime Minister in 1972.

== List of officeholders ==
Political parties

Democratic Party of Guinea – African Democratic Rally (PDG–RDA)
Unity and Progress Party (PUP)
Union for the Progress of Guinea (UPG)
Rally of the Guinean People (RPG)
Union of Democrats for the Renaissance of Guinea (UDRG)

Other factions

Military
Independent

No.	Portrait	Name (Birth–Death)	Term of office			Political party	President (Term)
No.	Portrait	Name (Birth–Death)	Took office	Left office	Time in office	Political party	President (Term)
1		Louis Lansana Beavogui (1923–1984)	26 April 1972	3 April 1984 (Deposed in a coup)	11 years, 343 days	PDG–RDA	Ahmed Sékou Touré (1958–1984)
1		Louis Lansana Beavogui (1923–1984)	26 April 1972	3 April 1984 (Deposed in a coup)	11 years, 343 days	PDG–RDA	Himself (1984)
2		Diarra Traoré (1935–1985)	5 April 1984	18 December 1984	257 days	Military	Lansana Conté (1984–2008)
Post abolished (18 December 1984 – 9 July 1996)							Lansana Conté (1984–2008)
3		Sidya Touré (1945–2026)	9 July 1996	8 March 1999	2 years, 242 days	Independent	Lansana Conté (1984–2008)
4		Lamine Sidimé (born 1944)	8 March 1999	23 February 2004	4 years, 352 days	PUP	Lansana Conté (1984–2008)
5		François Lonseny Fall (born 1949)	23 February 2004	15 July 2004	143 days	PUP	Lansana Conté (1984–2008)
Vacant (15 July 2004 – 9 December 2004) (Note: Disputed continuation of François Fall in exile until September 2004.)							Lansana Conté (1984–2008)
6		Cellou Dalein Diallo (born 1952)	9 December 2004	5 April 2006	1 year, 117 days	PUP	Lansana Conté (1984–2008)
Vacant (5 April 2006 – 9 February 2007)							Lansana Conté (1984–2008)
7		Eugène Camara (1942–2019)	9 February 2007	1 March 2007 (Note: Dismissed during the 2007 general strike.)	20 days	PUP	Lansana Conté (1984–2008)
8		Lansana Kouyaté (born 1950)	1 March 2007	23 May 2008	1 year, 83 days	Independent	Lansana Conté (1984–2008)
9		Ahmed Tidiane Souaré (born 1951)	23 May 2008	24 December 2008 (Deposed in a coup)	215 days	Independent	Lansana Conté (1984–2008)
10		Kabiné Komara (born 1950)	30 December 2008	26 January 2010	1 year, 27 days	Independent	Moussa Dadis Camara (2008–2009)
10		Kabiné Komara (born 1950)	30 December 2008	26 January 2010	1 year, 27 days	Independent	Sékouba Konaté (2009–2010)
11		Jean-Marie Doré (1938–2016)	26 January 2010	24 December 2010	332 days	UPG	Sékouba Konaté (2009–2010)
12		Mohamed Said Fofana (born 1952)	24 December 2010	29 December 2015	5 years, 5 days	Independent	Alpha Condé (2010–2021)
13		Mamady Youla (born 1961)	29 December 2015	24 May 2018	2 years, 146 days	Independent	Alpha Condé (2010–2021)
14		Ibrahima Kassory Fofana (born 1954)	24 May 2018	5 September 2021 (Deposed in a coup)	3 years, 104 days	RPG	Alpha Condé (2010–2021)
Vacant (5 September 2021 – 6 October 2021)							Mamady Doumbouya (2021–present)
15		Mohamed Béavogui (born 1953)	6 October 2021	17 July 2022	284 days	Independent	Mamady Doumbouya (2021–present)
16		Bernard Goumou (born 1980)	17 July 2022	19 February 2024	1 year, 217 days	Independent	Mamady Doumbouya (2021–present)
Vacant (19 February 2024 – 28 February 2024)							Mamady Doumbouya (2021–present)
17		Bah Oury (born 1958)	28 February 2024	Incumbent	2 years, 210 days	UDRG	Mamady Doumbouya (2021–present)

== See also ==
- Politics of Guinea
- List of presidents of Guinea
- List of colonial governors of French Guinea
