= People's Party of Guinea =

Political party in Guinea

People's Party of Guinea (French: Parti du peuple de Guinée) is a political party, based amongst the Kissi minority in the interior region. The party is led by Pascual Tolno, a former minister. Ahead of the 1998 election, the party was part of the RPG-led alliance Coordination of the Democratic Opposition (CODEM).
