= 1995 Guinean parliamentary election =

Parliamentary elections were held in Guinea on 11 June 1995. The first multi-party elections for the National Assembly since independence, they saw 21 parties field 846 candidates for the 114 seats, divided between 38 single-member constituencies and 76 based on proportional representation, although they were boycotted by the Union of Democratic Forces. The result was a victory for the Unity and Progress Party, which won 71 of the 114 seats. Voter turnout was 62%.

== Results ==
Party	Proportional			Constituency			Total seats
Party	Votes	%	Seats	Votes	%	Seats	Total seats
Unity and Progress Party	990,184	53.55	41			30	71
Rally of the Guinean People	354,927	19.20	15			4	19
Union for the New Republic	178,692	9.66	7			2	9
Union for Progress and Renewal	170,806	9.24	7			2	9
Union for the Progress of Guinea	44,441	2.40	2			0	2
Democratic Party of Guinea – African Democratic Rally	36,709	1.99	1			0	1
National Union for the Prosperity of Guinea	31,295	1.69	1			0	1
Democratic Party of Guinea	21,233	1.15	1			0	1
Dyama Party	20,696	1.12	1			0	1
Total	1,848,983	100.00	76			38	114
Valid votes	1,848,983	97.92		1,840,579	97.57		
Invalid/blank votes	39,330	2.08		45,824	2.43		
Total votes	1,888,313	100.00		1,886,403	100.00		
Registered voters/turnout	3,049,262	61.93		3,049,262	61.86		
Source: Nohlen et al., IPU
