= Siradiou Diallo =

Personal details
- Born: August 25, 1936 Labé, Guinea
- Died: 14 March 2004 (aged 67) Paris, France
- Party: Union for Progress and Renewal

Siradiou Diallo (August 25, 1936 in Labé – March 14, 2004 in Paris), a Fulani, was a Guinean journalist and politician of the opposition party Union for Progress and Renewal. He was a candidate during the 1993 Guinean presidential election where he received 11.86% of the vote. He also stood for presidency in the 1998 Guinean presidential election and the 2003 Guinean presidential election.

== Early years ==
Diallo was from Labé, located in Fouta Djallon, a highland region in the centre of the country. His father, Elhadj Ibrahima Gassama Diallo, was a government official, before and after the country's independence. His mother was Thierno Hadiatou Bah, was the eldest daughter of the reigning family of Dalaba. Diallo was the eldest son of a family that included 21 siblings. His paternal grandparents was Thierno Cellou Diallo, the leader of Pilimini (a village in Koubia Prefecture) and Bah Assiatou Thierno, eldest daughter of the venerable Thierno Aliou Bhoubha N'diyan.

Diallo received his initial education at Koranic Kottyou Timbi Touni in Pita Prefecture. He attended elementary school in Labé, graduating in 1951. After attending the 7th World Scout Jamboree in Bad Ischl, Austria, he spent four years studying in the capital of Guinea and in 1955, he entered École normale supérieure William Ponty. The first two years working on his baccalaureate were spent in Sébikotane Arrondissement in Senegal. He completed his baccalaureate in 1958 in Dakar with a Bachelor in philosophy. In 1959, he was enrolled at the University of Dakar Faculty of Arts and Humanities and Faculty of Law and Economics. Later, he studied economics at the university of Poitiers and Paris.

== Career ==
After his graduation in 1967, he worked at Banque Nationale de Paris and the French Ministry of Finance. In the late 1960s, he had a brief stint at the National Institute of Statistics and Economic Studies (INSEE). However, he was primarily a journalist and worked from 1970 for the magazine Jeune Afrique, rising to the position of editor in chief.

Parallel to his journalistic activities, he organized the Coalition of Guineans from outside (EGR), a group made up of Guineans exiled and traumatized by the terror regime of Sékou Touré. He held the position of secretary general of the EGR. Diallo founded, among others, the Comité de Réflexion sur la Démocratie en Guinée (CRDG). After Toure's death in 1984, Diallo returned to Guinea. In 1991, he became secretary general of the Parti du Progrès Guinée (PGP) and founded a year later, the Parti du Progrès et du Renouveau (PRP) ("Revival and Progress Party"). The pressure of the growing opposition created the bloodless coup which led to President Lansana Conté coming to power. In the uneasy presidential election in Guinea of 1993, Diallo was a candidate for president and one of Conté's main rivals. He accused the government of electoral fraud. From 1995, Diallo was a deputy in the National Assembly of Guinea.

In the 1998 Guinean presidential election, Diallo's Union pour la Nouvelle Republique (UNR) joined forces with Mamadou Bah and Union pour le Progrès et le Renouveau (UPR) ("Union for Progress and Reform"). Diallo became the leader of the UPR, a Fulani supported party and worked towards engagement with the electoral process. The joint bid in Fulbe by the politicians, however, intensified ethnic conflict. At the same time, this alienated the 1998 planned expulsion of over a hundred thousand people, most of whom were Fulani, from a district of Conakry, the Fulbe from the Conté regime. There were violent protests and clashes between the population, opposition and police.

In the parliamentary elections in 2002, Diallo's UPR was the only opposition party to participate, and it won 20 of the 114 parliamentary seats. He stood again for presidency in the 2003 Guinean presidential election, participating in a national election tour. Among other issues, he opposed the charge finding that the UPR had conducted a secret agreement with the government. The elections, however, were boycotted by all major opposition parties, including the UPR, due to lack of fairness.

Diallo denounced political fatalism. He died on March 14, 2004, in Paris at the age of 68 years from a cardiac arrest.
