= 2015 Guinean presidential election =

- 11 October 2015
- Registered: 6,042,634
- Turnout: 68.44%
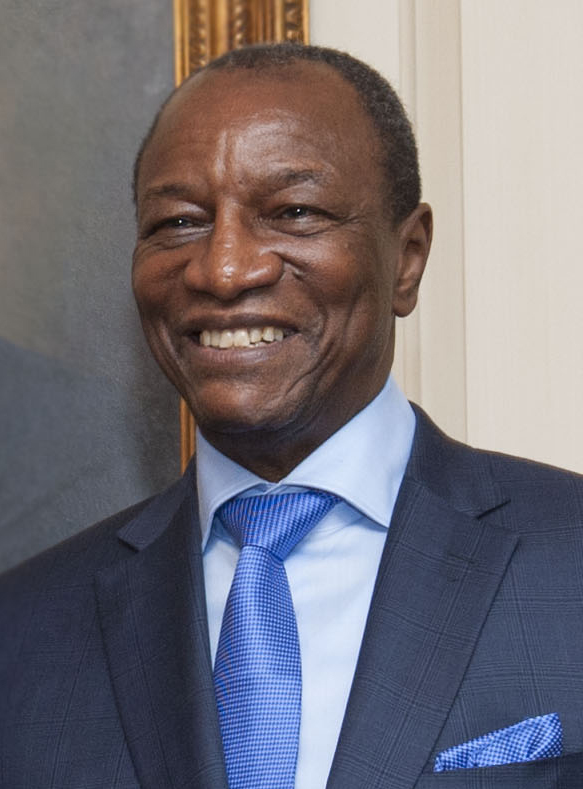

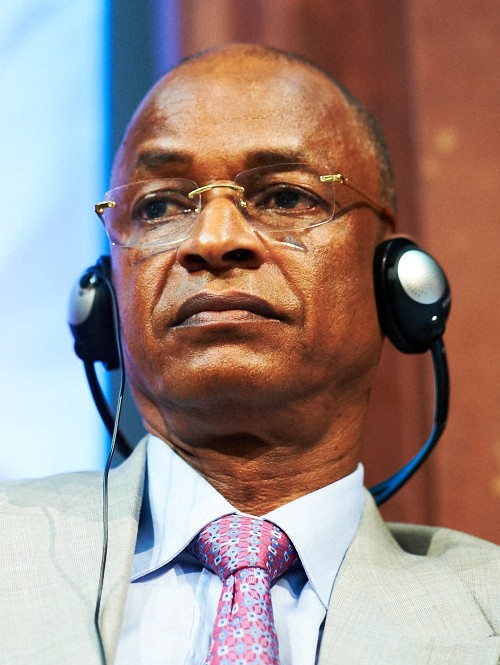

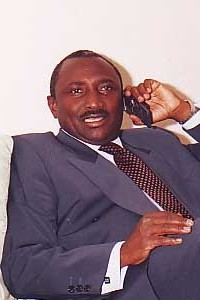
Nominee	Alpha Condé	Cellou Dalein Diallo	Sidya Touré
Party	RPG	UFDG	UFR
Popular vote	2,284,827	1,242,362	237,549
Percentage	57.84%	31.45%	6.01%
President before election
Alpha Condé
RPG
Elected President
Alpha Condé
RPG

Presidential elections were held in Guinea on 11 October 2015. The result was a first-round victory for incumbent President Alpha Condé, who received 58% of the vote.

== Background ==
In December 2013, the Ebola virus epidemic in West Africa that began in Guinea spread to neighbouring Sierra Leone and Liberia, as well as with health workers and visitors who returned to their respective countries. At the time of the elections the worst of the epidemic was over, although there were still a lesser number of prevalent cases.

The seven opposition parties called for a postponement, citing alleged irregularities in the electoral roll, but their pleas were rejected by the Independent National Electoral Commission (CENI). Cellou Dalein Diallo of the Union of Democratic Forces of Guinea (UFDG) also petitioned the Supreme Court of Guinea to have the election postponed, but it was rejected.

== Electoral system ==
The elections were held using the two-round system, with a second round taking place if no candidate received more than 50% of the vote in the first round. Presidents are limited to two terms in office, allowing incumbent president Alpha Condé to run for a second term.

== Campaign ==
A total of eight candidates contested the elections; including incumbent Condé, Diallo, who was named as the candidate of the UFDG on 25 July 2015, Sidya Touré of the Union of Republican Forces, Papa Koly Kourouma of the Generations for Reconciliation, Union, and Prosperity party, Georges Gandhi Faraguet of the Guinean Union for Democracy and Development, Faya Millimouno of the Liberal Bloc, Marie Madeleine Dioubaté of the Guinea Ecologists Party and Lansana Kouyaté of the National Party for Hope and Development.

During the campaign Condé told voters that he aimed to promote development and consolidate stability. Diallo promised to give priority to youth employment, as well as "access to health care, decent housing, water, electricity, safety, and justice". His campaign slogan promised to deliver a "KO blow" to his opponents. He cited his record on overhauling the army and judiciary, the completion of a hydroelectric dam and reforms in making the mineral-rich country's mining contracts more transparent. He said in an interview: "Ask the people of Guinea if what we have done in five years, the others did in 50. Ask that on the streets." His campaign was said to benefit from improving supply of electricity in Conakry and the relative stability the country endured despite the Ebola epidemic.

Diallo called on voters to make their voices heard following the rejection of his plea for a delay of the "imperfect" process. "We will vote, defend our suffrage, defend our victory because there is no way we will let our victory be stolen." Prior to the vote, all seven opponents of the incumbent said they would challenge the outcome. A joint statement read: "The seven candidates will not recognise the results which will be made following an election with anomalies and irregularities."

== Conduct ==
Violence during the election campaign, including clashes between supporters of Condé and Diallo in Koundara, led to the deaths of at least three people. A curfew was put in place in Nzérékoré after one person was killed and dozens injured during a visit by Condé on 5 October. United Nations Secretary-General Ban Ki-moon then called for the vote to be "conducted in a peaceful and transparent manner."

Voting centres were open from 7:00 until 18:00, while national borders were closed for the day and traffic restricted to that of electoral observers, government officials and security forces, in accordance with a presidential decree. Around 19,000 police and members of the security services were on duty. Condé also declared that over 90% of voter cards had been distributed.

Monitors included an African Union observer mission and a 72-member European Union delegation. The EU delegation cited “massive deficiencies” ahead of polling; however, in its post-election report it concluded that the process overall was “valid”.

== Results ==
Candidate	Party	Votes	%
Alpha Condé	Rally of the Guinean People	2,284,827	57.84
Cellou Dalein Diallo	Union of Democratic Forces of Guinea	1,242,362	31.45
Sidya Touré	Union of Republican Forces	237,549	6.01
Faya Millimono	Liberal Bloc	54,718	1.39
Papa Koly Kourouma	Generations for Reconciliation, Union, and Prosperity	51,750	1.31
Lansana Kouyaté	Party of Hope for National Development	45,962	1.16
Georges Gandhi Tounkara	Guinean Union for Democracy and Development	19,840	0.50
Marie Madeleine Dioubaté	Guinea Ecologists Party	13,214	0.33
Total		3,950,222	100.00
Valid votes		3,950,222	95.52
Invalid/blank votes		185,091	4.48
Total votes		4,135,313	100.00
Registered voters/turnout		6,042,634	68.44
Source: Constitutional Court

== Reactions ==
After CENI head Bakary Fofana announced there would be no run-off, Diallo and Touré alleged fraud and said they would not recognise the result. Diallo said "I will invite the other candidates and all the citizens who are the real victims of this electoral hold-up to organise, conforming to the law, peaceful demonstrations to express our disapproval of this situation", and that the demonstrations would occur "at the appropriate time... to express our indignation and protest against this serious denial of democracy", while a spokesman for Condé criticised the notion of holding protests, saying that it "risks dragging the country into instability, chaos and violence". He urged supporters of Condé to "stay calm, avoid gloating and get ready to face the numerous challenges that await us".

Final results were announced by the Constitutional Court on 31 October 2015, closely matching the provisional results from the electoral commission. Condé was credited with 57.84% of the vote (2,284,827 votes) and Diallo with 31.45%. Condé was accordingly declared to have won in a single round, with his second term to begin on 21 December.

Condé was sworn in on 14 December 2015.
