= Fodé Bangoura =

Guinean politician

Fodé Bangoura is a Guinean political figure, once a key aide to President Lansana Conté.

He was appointed by decree this on 21 May 2021 as permanent secretary of the permanent framework for political and social dialogue.
