= 1996 Guinean coup attempt =

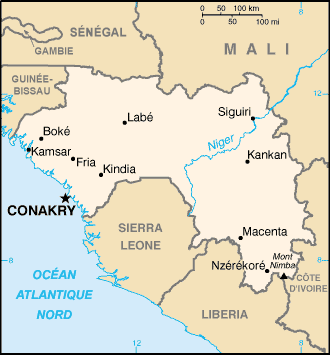
Date	February 2 - February 3
Location	Conakry, Guinea
Result	Failed coup attempt; government retains control

Belligerents
Republic of Guinea Armed Forces	(Guinea) Dissenting faction of the armed forces

Commanders and leaders
(Guinea) Lansana Conte	(Guinea) Gbago Zoumanigul (Guinea) Lt. Lamine Diarra

Strength
Unknown	2000 soldiers

Casualties and losses
- 20-40 deaths

The 1996 Guinean coup attempt was a failed coup d'état in Guinea by dissident elements within the Guinean military against the Lansana Conté government. Originally a mutiny over a pay dispute, where around 2,000 soldiers demanded higher pay and better benefits, it then escalated into an attempted military overthrow which nearly toppled the government. By February 3, an agreement had been reached and state radio instructed soldiers to return to their units.

The coup attempt reportedly began in the early hours of February 2 in the nation's capital - Conakry. During the twelve-hour-long clashes against the government forces, the rebels seized control of the capital's deserted city center and continuously shelled the presidential palace, which started a fire. The bloody clashes resulted in as many as forty deaths, mostly civilians. Rebel forces also captured President Conté, yet he was later freed after promising to raise soldiers' salaries.

In the aftermath of the failed coup, around a hundred military personnel were arrested: forty were later released due to insufficient evidence while fifty-seven still remained in detention as of January 1998. Commander Gbago Zoumanigul, a key figure in instigating the coup, fled the country to Libya, while another important leader - Lieutenant Lamine Diarra - was handed over to government authorities after trying to seek refuge in the Malian embassy of the capital. Several top army officials implicated still remained at large, including Colonel Ibrahima Sory Diallo, Colonel Abdouramane Kaba, Sama Panival Bangoura, Mohammad Lamine Traore, and Oumah Soumah.
