= Lansanya =

- Sub-prefecture and town
- Location in Guinea
- Coordinates: 11°23′N 10°53′W
- Country: Guinea
- Region: Kindia Region
- Prefecture: Dubreka Prefecture

Population
  - Total: 9,191
- Time zone: UTC+0 (GMT)

Lansanya is a town and sub-prefecture in the Dubreka Prefecture in the Kindia Region of western Guinea. As of 2014 it had a population of 9,191 people.

The residence of Lansana Conté, who was President of Guinea is located in Lansanya. Conté was buried in front of his mansion on December 26, 2008.
