= Union for Development Party =

Political party in Guinea

The Union for Development Party (French: Parti de l'Union pour le Développement, PUD) is a political party in Guinea. In the parliamentary election held on 30 June 2002, the party won 0.66% of the popular vote and 1 out of 114 seats.
