= Union for the New Republic (Guinea) =

Union for the New Republic Union pour la Nouvelle République
- Abbreviation: UNR
- Leader: Bâ Mamadou
- Dissolved: 1998
- Merger of: Renewal and Progress Party
- Merged into: Union for Progress and Renewal

Union for the New Republic (in French: Union pour la Nouvelle République, UNR) was a political party in Guinea, led by Bâ Mamadou. In 1998, it merged with Siradiou Diallo's Renewal and Progress Party to form the Union for Progress and Renewal (UPR).

== See also ==
- Union for Progress and Renewal (Guinea).
- Siradiou Diallo.
- Politics of Guinea.
- List of political parties in Guinea.
- Elections in Guinea.
- Political party.
