= National Alliance for Progress =

Political party in Guinea

The National Alliance for Progress (French: Alliance Nationale pour le Progrès, ANP) is a political party in Guinea. In the parliamentary election held on 30 June 2002, the party won 2% of the popular vote and 2 out of 114 seats.
