= Cellou Dalein Diallo =

Guinean economist and politician

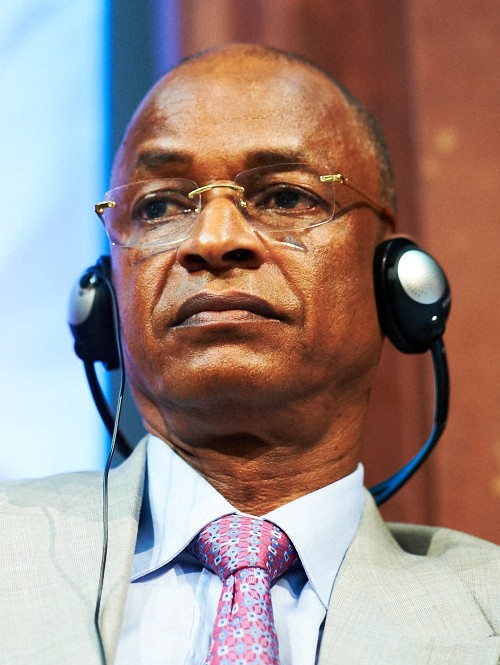

6th Prime Minister of Guinea
- In office 9 December 2004 – 5 April 2006
- President: Lansana Conté
- Preceded by: François Lonseny Fall
- Succeeded by: Eugène Camara

Personal details
- Born: 3 February 1952 (age 74) Dalein, Labé Guinea
- Party: Union of Democratic Forces of Guinea (since 2007)
- Other political affiliations: Unity and Progress Party (until 2007)
- Education: University of Conakry
- Profession: Economist, politician
- Religion: Islam
- Ethnic Group: Fula

Cellou Dalein Diallo (born 3 February 1952) is a Guinean economist and politician who was Prime Minister of Guinea from 2004 to 2006. Previously he held a succession of ministerial posts in the government from 1996 to 2004. Currently he is President of the Union of Democratic Forces of Guinea (UFDG), an opposition party. He was a candidate in the 2020 Guinean presidential election but lost to incumbent Alpha Condé.

== Background and early career ==
Diallo, a member of the Fula ethnic group, was born in Labé. He studied at the University of Conakry and the Center for Financial, Economic and Banking Studies in Paris, and in 1976 he became an inspector of trade. He began working at the Bank of Foreign Trade of Guinea in 1982, and from 1985 to 1995 he worked at the Central Bank of the Republic of Guinea.

After briefly working at the Administration and Control of Great Projects (l’Administration et Contrôle des Grands Projets, ACGP), Diallo joined the government in July 1996 as Minister of Transport, Telecommunications and Tourism. He was subsequently moved to the position of Minister of Infrastructure in October 1997, where he remained until he was appointed as Minister of Public Works and Transport on 12 March 1999. After UTA Flight 141, a flight from Guinea, crashed in Cotonou, Benin in December 2003, Diallo said that there was no proof that his ministry had been neglectful of safety and that he would not resign. Diallo served for five years as Minister of Public Works and Transport before being moved to the position of Minister of Fisheries and Aquaculture on 23 February 2004.

== Prime minister ==
On 9 December 2004, Diallo was appointed as prime minister by President Lansana Conté. The position of prime minister had previously been vacant since April 2004 due to the resignation of François Lonseny Fall. Diallo took office as prime minister on 13 December.

Diallo—who speaks English in addition to French—played a role in the Conté regime. However, allegations of corruption coupled with disagreements with Conté's top associates, particularly Fodé Bangoura, the Secretary-General of the Presidency, and Mamadou Sylla, a wealthy businessman, culminated in Diallo's removal from his prime minister post.

On 4 April 2006, changes to the government which would have greatly increased Diallo's power were announced. These changes would have replaced a number of ministers with Diallo's own allies and would have placed Diallo personally in charge of several portfolios, including those of economy, finance, international cooperation, and planning. The decree approving the changes was said to be signed by President Conté, but it was later speculated that Conté might not have realized the significance of what he was signing at the time. A radio broadcast announcing the changes was interrupted by soldiers, which was said to be because Fodé Bangoura had not been notified in advance. On the next day, it was announced that Diallo's changes were reversed, and a few hours later it was announced that Diallo had been dismissed as prime minister "for serious misconduct".

Although there were subsequently reports that Diallo had been placed under house arrest, he denied this in an interview with IRIN and thanked Conté for maintaining confidence in him during his time in the government.

== Opposition leader ==
On 8 November 2007, an opposition political party, the Union of Democratic Forces of Guinea (UFDG), announced that it had appointed Diallo as its president, succeeding Mamadou Boye Bah. After he took office as the group's leader, Diallo said on 15 November that he believed that Conté would not run in the 2010 presidential election; he also said that he "always maintained good relations with General Lansana Conté and his family".

Following the appointment of Ahmed Tidiane Souaré as prime minister, Diallo was present, along with other former ministers, when Souaré gave a press conference on 22 May 2008. On 28 May, he was one of the party leaders who met with Souaré to discuss the formation of a national unity government.

Conté died in December 2008 and soldiers immediately seized power in a military coup d'état. About 20 soldiers searched Diallo's home on 1 January 2009, while holding Diallo and his family at gunpoint. According to Diallo, the search was based on suspicions that Diallo might have weapons and mercenaries as part of a coup plot, but he said that the soldiers did not take anything from his home. A junta delegation met with Diallo on 2 January and condemned the search, saying that "uncontrollable elements out to hurt the junta" were to blame and that the junta had nothing to do with it.

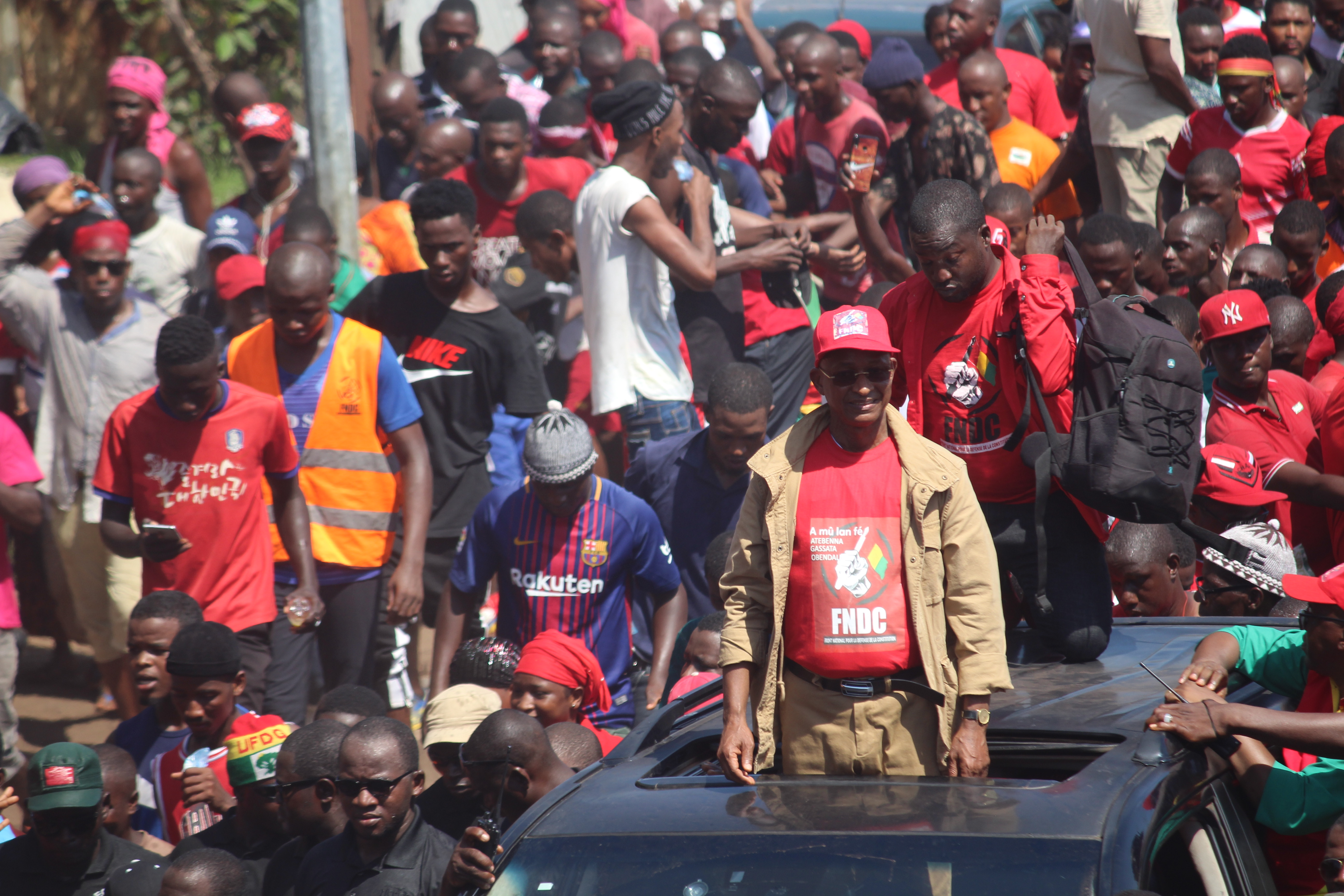
Cellou Dalein Diallo (2019)

Diallo tried to hold a meeting in Kerouane in June 2009, but the junta did not allow him to do so; it also would not let him stay overnight in Kankan. After junta leader Moussa Dadis Camara suggested in August 2009 that he might stand as a presidential candidate in the planned 2010 election, Diallo urged him not to do so, saying that the election's "transparency and reliability ... require[d] the administration's neutrality and impartiality". After spending time in France and Senegal, he returned to Conakry on 13 September 2009 and was greeted at the airport by about 60,000 supporters.

On 28 September 2009, Diallo participated in a massive opposition protest in Conakry, which was directed against Camara's suspected aspirations to run for president in 2010. He was injured at the protest, in which soldiers opened fire on the protesters and allegedly killed 157 people; three of his ribs were reportedly broken. Subsequently, he was barred from leaving the country for medical treatment on 30 September, but soon afterwards he was transported to Dakar aboard the Senegalese presidential plane, and from there he was flown to Paris for treatment.

Diallo placed first in the first round of the 2010 presidential election, but he was defeated by Alpha Condé in the second round.

On 25 July 2015, Diallo was named as the UFDG's candidate for the 2015 presidential election at a party congress; he was also re-elected to lead the party for another five years.

The UFDG nominated Diallo as president in the 2020 Guinean presidential election. Diallo received only 33% of the vote but declared himself the victor. This prompted riots which led to over 30 deaths as well as barricades around Diallo's home and the UFDG's headquarters. Ten days after the election, Diallo's house arrest was lifted.

In September 2021, Cellou Dalein Diallo supported the putschists who carried out the 2021 coup.

Political offices
Preceded by François Lonseny Fall	Prime Minister of Guinea; 2004–2006	Succeeded by Eugène Camara
