= 2002 Guinean parliamentary election =

Parliamentary elections were held in Guinea on 30 June 2002 after several postponements, over two years after it was originally scheduled to be held. The result was a victory for President Lansana Conté's Unity and Progress Party, which won 85 of the 114 seats.

Radical opposition parties, including the Guinean People's Rally (RPG) and the Union of Forces for the Republic, chose to boycott the elections, believing that they would be a farce.

== Results ==
The PUP won all 38 single-member constituency seats and 47 proportional representation seats. In addition to the 85 seats won by the PUP, the Democratic Party of Guinea (PDG) and the National Alliance for Progress (ANP), which also supported President Conté, won a few seats (three for the PDG, one for the ANP). The opposition Union for the Progress of Guinea (UPG) disputed the results and refused to take up the three seats that it won.

Party	Proportional			Constituency			Total seats	+/–
Party	Votes	%	Seats	Votes	%	Seats	Total seats	+/–
Unity and Progress Party	1,947,318	61.57	47			38	85	+14
Union for Progress and Renewal	842,270	26.63	20			0	20	New
Union for the Progress of Guinea	130,065	4.11	3			0	3	+1
Democratic Party of Guinea	107,666	3.40	3			0	3	2
National Alliance for Progress	62,780	1.98	2			0	2	New
Union for Development Party	20,823	0.66	1			0	1	New
People's Party of Guinea	19,297	0.61	0			0	0	New
Union for Democracy and Solidarity	16,342	0.52	0			0	0	New
Ecologists' Party of Guinea	16,294	0.52	0			0	0	New
Total	3,162,855	100.00	76			38	114	0
Valid votes	3,162,855	99.06						
Invalid/blank votes	30,015	0.94						
Total votes	3,192,870	100.00						
Registered voters/turnout	4,458,831	71.61						
Source: African Elections Database
