= Sidya Touré =

Guinean politician (1945–2026)

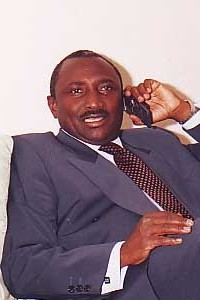
Sidya Touré

Sidya Touré (15 August 1945 – 25 September 2026) was a Guinean politician. He was Prime Minister of Guinea from 1996 to 1999 and was latterly the president of the Union of Republican Forces (UFR), an opposition party.

== Prime minister ==
Having previously been in exile in Côte d'Ivoire, Touré, who was considered a "reform-minded technocrat", was appointed prime minister by President Lansana Conté on 9 July 1996, becoming Guinea's first prime minister since 1984.

Touré's appointment, which followed a coup attempt in February 1996, was characterized as part of an effort by Conté to pursue reforms. However, after a few years of Touré's reformist policies, Conté appeared to change course and dismissed Touré, who was succeeded by Lamine Sidimé on 8 March 1999.

== Opposition leader ==
After leaving the government, Touré became an opposition leader; he was latterly the president of the UFR.

Along with the other major opposition leaders, Touré announced in early November 2003 that he would boycott the December 2003 presidential election due to concerns that it would not be free and fair and the government's failure to accept opposition demands.

After Touré organised a rally in the Conakry suburb of Gbessia in late 2003, student riots broke out, and as a result Touré was detained and questioned. Subsequently, in late April 2004, he was arrested and detained for one night. Touré was charged with plotting to overthrow the government, and although he was released on bail, he was barred from politics and from travelling to other countries. He was cleared of the charges by an appeal court in July 2004.

Touré participated in a major opposition protest in Conakry on 28 September 2009; the protest was directed against the suspected intent of junta leader Moussa Dadis Camara to stand as a candidate in the January 2010 presidential election. The military attacked the protesters, killing many of them; Touré suffered a serious head injury and was hospitalized. Although the junta barred opposition leaders from speaking to the press, Touré covertly phoned the BBC's Focus on Africa from a hospital bathroom and gave his account of events; he said that soldiers "just started to shoot people directly ... They tried to kill us." Touré was released from custody on 29 September and returned to his home (which was also the UFR headquarters), discovering that it had been ransacked. On 1 October 2009 he said that the opposition could not talk to the government in the wake of such violence and that planned elections needed to be held under a neutral authority. He rejected the junta's offer of a national unity government, saying that the people were mourning and were in a state of shock from the events of 28 September; according to Touré, the immediate priority was to determine who gave the order to open fire on the protesters.

=== 2010 presidential election ===
Standing as the UFR candidate for the June 2010 presidential election, Touré was one of the main candidates, but ultimately he placed third, receiving 13.62% of the vote. He initially challenged the results, but after they were confirmed by the Supreme Court of Guinea, he publicly accepted the outcome of the first round on 22 July 2010: "Whether we are a victim or not, I think we should start by respecting the institutions and moving on." Despite his failure to win a place in the second round, in which first place candidate Cellou Dallein Diallo was to face runner-up Alpha Condé, Touré had enough support that he was perceived as a potential "kingmaker" who could sway the second round outcome by endorsing a candidate. "We shall submit our proposals for government to both the candidates", Touré said, adding that "it is an alliance that we are after and we shall wait and see the outcome of negotiations with the two leaders."

In September 2021, Sidya Touré returned to Guinea after 10 months of exile in Europe.

== Death ==
Sidya Touré died at a hospital in Paris, France, on 25 September 2026, at the age of 81.

== See also ==
- Politics of Guinea

Political offices
Preceded by Post Abolished	Prime Minister of Guinea; 1996–1999	Succeeded by Lamine Sidimé
