= Guinéenews =

Website in Republic of Guinea

Guinéenews is a web site solely dedicated to the dissemination of news about the Republic of Guinea. Guinéenews employs five full-time journalists based in Conakry with technical and operational support staff in Canada. Guinéenews is a primary source for current event news in Guinea. The site was created in 1997.

In October 2017, Guineenews.org celebrated 20 years of operation with multiple events in Conakry, including a gala at a local hotel and a documentary screening.
