= Union of Democratic Forces of Guinea =

Political party in Guinea

Union of Democratic Forces of Guinea Union des forces démocratiques de Guinée
- Founded: 1991
- Dissolved: 2026
- Ideology: Liberalism; Social liberalism
- Political position: Centre
- Regional affiliation: Africa Liberal Network
- International affiliation: Liberal International

The Union of Democratic Forces of Guinea (UFDG; French: Union des forces démocratiques de Guinée) was a social-liberal political party in Guinea. It was the main opposition party of Guinea from 2010 to 2020. In 2026, the party was dissolved by the government of president Mamady Doumbouya.

== History ==
The UFDG was founded in 1991 by a number of opposition parties and groups. In October 2002, the party was joined by a faction of the Union for Progress and Renewal party under the leadership of Bâ Mamadou, which unlike the majority of their party wished to boycott the 2002 parliamentary election. Mamadou Ba was subsequently elected as president of UFDG. The party was affiliated with the Republican Front for Democratic Change alliance, which intended to field a candidate in the 2003 presidential election.

In 2007, Cellou Dalein Diallo became the new president of the party. Diallo stood for the party in the 2010 presidential election, topping the poll in the first round before narrowly losing to Alpha Condé in the second round.

On 25 July 2015, Diallo was named as the UFDG's candidate for the 2015 presidential election at a party congress; he was also re-elected to lead the party for another five years.

In 2026, the party was dissolved by the government of president Mamady Doumbouya.

== Electoral history ==
=== Presidential elections ===
Election	Party candidate	Votes	%	Votes	%	Result
Election	Party candidate	First round		Second round		Result
2010	Cellou Dalein Diallo	772,496	43.60%	1,333,666	47.48%	Lost ✗
2015	Cellou Dalein Diallo	1,242,362	31.45%	—N/a	—N/a	Lost ✗
2020	Cellou Dalein Diallo	1,373,320	33.50%	—N/a	—N/a	Lost ✗

=== National Assembly elections ===
Election	Party leader	Votes	%	Votes	%	Seats	+/–	Position	Result
Election	Party leader	Constituency		Proportional		Seats	+/–	Position	Result
2013	Cellou Dalein Diallo	711,393	24.08%	967,173	30.48%	37 / 114	▲37	▲2nd	Opposition
2020	Cellou Dalein Diallo	Did not participate				0 / 114	▼37	▼ N/A	Extra-parliamentary
