= Union of Republican Forces =

Political party in Guinea

Union of Republican Forces Union des Forces Républicaines
- Abbreviation: UFR
- Leader: Sidya Touré
- Founded: 1992
- Dissolved: 2026
- Ideology: Liberalism
- Political position: Centre
- Regional affiliation: Africa Liberal Network
- International affiliation: Liberal International
- Colors: Blue
- Slogan: Union, Development, Peace

Website
- http://www.ufrguinee.com/

The Union of Republican Forces (UFR; French: Union des Forces Républicaines) was a liberal political party in Guinea. Founded in 1992, the party was led by the former Prime Minister of Guinea Sidya Touré since 1999. The party supported the 2007 general strike.

Touré finished in third place in both the 2010 and 2015 presidential elections, with vote shares of 15.6% and 6.0%, respectively.

In 2026, the party was dissolved by the government of president Mamady Doumbouya.

== Electoral history ==
=== Presidential elections ===
Election	Party candidate	Votes	%	Votes	%	Result
Election	Party candidate	First round		Second round		Result
2010	Sidya Touré	230,867	13.03%			Lost ✗
2015	Sidya Touré	237,549	6.01%	—N/a	—N/a	Lost ✗

=== National Assembly elections ===
Election	Party leader	Votes	%	Votes	%	Seats	+/–	Position	Result
Election	Party leader	Constituency		Proportional		Seats	+/–	Position	Result
2013	Sidya Touré	337,312	11.15%	222,101	7.00%	10 / 114	▲10	▲3rd	Opposition
2020	Sidya Touré	Did not participate				0 / 114	▼10	▼ N/A	Extra-parliamentary
