= Union of the Forces of Change (Guinea) =

Political party in Guinea

Union of the Forces of Change Union des forces du changement
- Abbreviation: UFC
- Leader: Aboubacar Sylla
- Colours: Green
- National Assembly: 2 / 114

Website
- www.ufcguinee.com

The Union of the Forces of Change (French: Union des forces du changement; UFC) is a political party in Guinea. The party is led by Aboubacar Sylla who is the current Minister of State and Minister of Transport. The party won two seats at the 2020 parliamentary election.
