= Unity and Progress Party =

Political party in Guinea

Unity and Progress Party Parti de l'Unité et du Progrès
- Abbreviation: PUP
- Leader: Elhadj Moussa Solano
- Secretary-General: Aboubacar Somparé (1995–2002)
- Founder: Lansana Conté
- Founded: 1992
- Dissolved: 7 March 2026
- Headquarters: Conakry

The Unity and Progress Party (PUP; French: Parti de l'Unité et du Progrès) was a political party in Guinea. It served as the dominant ruling party of Guinea from its establishment in 1992 to 2008, during the latter two-thirds of president Lansana Conté's rule.

In the parliamentary elections held on 30 June 2002, the party won 61.57% of the popular vote and 85 out of 114 seats. In the 2003 presidential elections, Lansana Conté was reelected with over 95% of the vote, as most opposition groups had boycotted the election.

Following Conté's death on 22 December 2008, members of the Republic of Guinea Armed Forces seized power in a coup d'état, ending the rule of the PUP. The party continued to exist following the coup, although its influence in Guinean politics was severely weakened. In the 2010 presidential elections, the PUP nominated Aboubacar Somparé, a prominent figure in the Conté regime, as its presidential candidate. Somparé received less than 1% of the vote. The party was dissolved in 2026 by the government of president Mamady Doumbouya.

== Electoral history ==
=== Presidential elections ===
| Election | Party candidate | Votes | % | Result |
| Election | Party candidate | First round | | Result |
|---|---|---|---|---|
| 1993 | Lansana Conté | 1,077,017 | 51.7% | Elected ✓ |
| 1998 | Lansana Conté | 1,455,007 | 56.1% | Elected ✓ |
| 2003 | Lansana Conté | 3,905,824 | 95.6% | Elected ✓ |
| 2010 | Aboubacar Somparé | 16,947 | 0.96% | Lost ✗ |

=== National Assembly elections ===
| Election | Votes | % | Seats | +/– | Position | Result |
| Election | Proportional | | Seats | +/– | Position | Result |
|---|---|---|---|---|---|---|
| 1995 | 990,184 | 53.5% | 71 / 114 | ▲71 | ▲1st | Majority government |
| 2002 | 1,947,318 | 61.5% | 85 / 114 | ▲14 | 1st | Supermajority government |
| 2013 | 13,503 | 0.43% | 0 / 114 | ▼85 | ▼17th | Extra-parliamentary |
