= 2010 Guinean presidential election =

- 27 June 2010 (first round); 7 November 2010 (second round)
- Turnout: 51.60% (first round); 67.87% (second round)
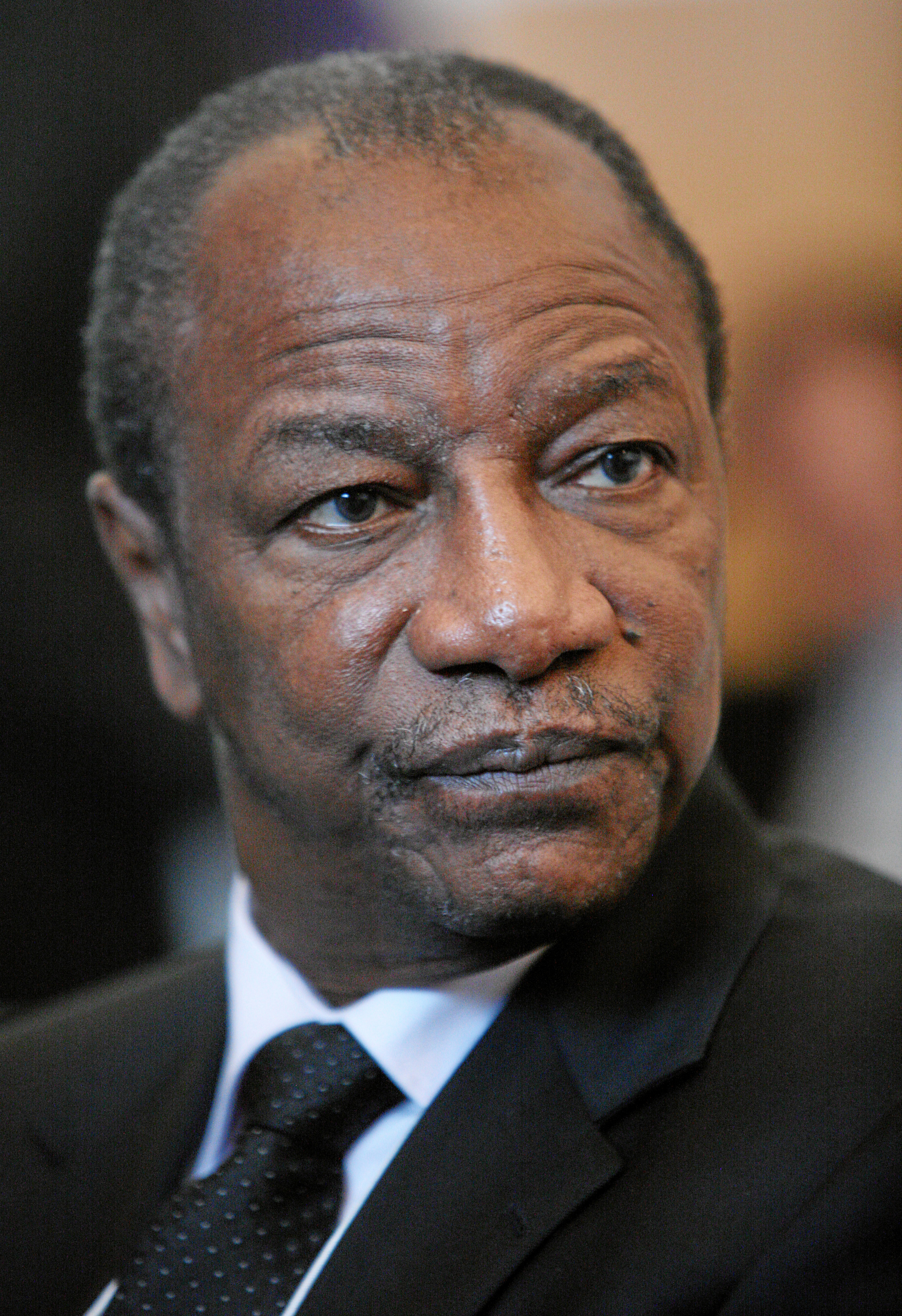

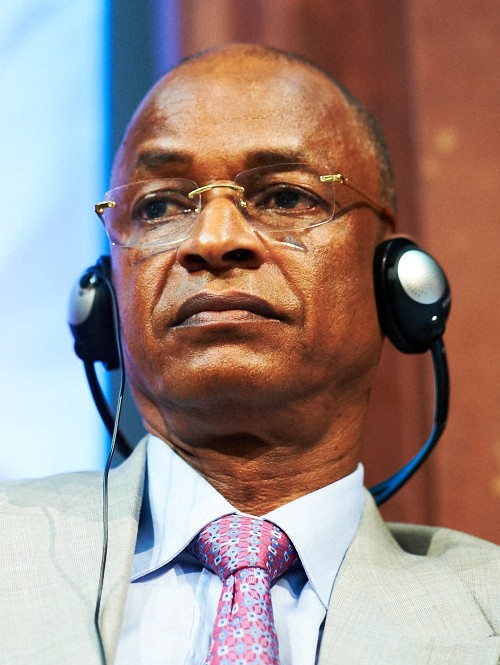
Nominee	Alpha Condé	Cellou Dalein Diallo
Party	RPG	UFDG
Popular vote	1,474,973	1,333,666
Percentage	52.52%	47.48%
- Condé: 50-60% 60-70% 70-80% 80-90% >90% Diallo: 50-60% 60-70% 70-80% 80-90% >90%
President before election
Sékouba Konaté (acting)
Independent
Elected President
Alpha Condé
RPG

Presidential elections were held in Guinea in 2010. They were held under the two-round system, with the first round taking place on 27 June 2010 and the second round on 7 November, after an initial date of 18 July and several other postponements. Alpha Condé was declared the winner, with 52.52% of the votes in the second round. He assumed office on 21 December 2010.

The elections came after a coup in 2008 and the attempted assassination of the junta leader Moussa Dadis Camara in December 2009. There were months of tension and unrest during the electoral process, in which the two main candidates represented the two largest ethnic groups in Guinea: the Fula (French: Peul; Fula: Fulɓe) and the Maninka (Malinke). The elections were also the first free national election held in Guinea since it gained independence in 1958.

== Background ==
The election was originally scheduled to be held on 13 December 2009 (with a second round, if necessary, held on 27 December 2009) following the 2008 Guinean coup d'état. Civilian and political groups proposed to hold them in December after legislative elections in October 2009. The government agreed in late March 2009 to set the election date for 13 and 27 December, but it was then again delayed until 31 January 2010.

While junta leader Moussa Dadis Camara had initially stated he would not run in the election, he declared on 16 April 2009 that he, like every citizen, had the right to stand in the election. On 10 May 2009, however, he stated again that neither he nor any of the other officers involved would stand in the election. Despite this vow, supporters of Camara held a rally in August 2009 to call for him to take off his uniform and run in the elections. The United States felt that he had to abstain from running to ensure a free and fair election.

After Camara was shot in early December 2009 and Konaté took over as the country's leader, an agreement was reached on 16 January 2010 which stipulated that Camara would remain out of the country (where he had been treated for his gunshot wounds), that a transitional government would be formed and that presidential elections would be held within six months.

The election was seen as a chance to change decades of authoritarian rule following independence, as well as to bring stability and foreign investment. This was also the first democratic election since independence in 1958.

== Candidates ==
Twenty-four candidates were approved to run in the election, among them four former prime ministers (Cellou Dalein Diallo, François Lonseny Fall, Lansana Kouyaté and Sidya Touré).

- Alpha Condé (RPG)
- Sidya Touré (UFR)
- Cellou Dalein Diallo (UFDG)
- Jean Marc Telliano (RDIG)
- François Lounceny Fall (FUDEC)
- Elhadj Mamadou Sylla (UDG)
- Mamadou Diawara (PTS)
- Ibrahima Kassory Fofana (GPT)
- Bouna Keita (RGP)
- Ibrahima Abe Sylla (NGR)
- Boubacar Barry (PNR)
- M'bemba Traoré (PDU)
- Ousmane Kaba (PLUS)
- Abraham Bouré (RGUD)
- Ousmane Bah (UPR)
- Saran Daraba Kaba (CDP)
- Fodé Mohamed Soumah (GECI)
- Boubacar Bah (ADPG)
- Lansana Kouyaté (PEDN)
- Mamadou Baadiko Bah (UFD)
- Aboubacar Somparé (PUP)
- Papa Koly Kouroumah (RDR)
- Alpha Ibrahima Keïra (PR)
- Joseph Bangoura (UDIG)

== Campaign ==
For the run-off, at least twelve minor candidates (Francois Louceny Fall, Ousmane Kaba, Hadja Saran Daraba Kaba, Jean Marc Teliano, El Hadj Bouna Keita, Mamadou Diawara, Ibrahima Kassory Fofana, El Hadj Mamadou Sylla, Alpha Ibrahima Keira, M'Bemba Traore, Joseph Bangoura and Abraham Boure) voiced their support for Condé over the frontrunner. However, Diallo gained the support of Touré, who came third. Condé then also gained the support of fourth-placed Lansana Kouyaté.

== Conduct ==
As had been expected by observers, the run-off was delayed from 18 July to a later date. The second round was then set for 14 August 2010. On 9 August, less than a week before the runoff was to take place, the vote was delayed again, to 19 September.

On 10 September, the president of the National Independent Electoral Commission (CENI), Ben Sekou Sylla, and another official were convicted of vote-tampering during the first round of voting. The two were sentenced to "one year in prison and a fine of two million Guinea francs [$350] each for electoral fraud." Sylla died in a Paris hospital on 14 September following a long illness, and the odds of holding the election on time were very low as tensions rose in the country. Boubacar Diallo, the commission's director of planning, said "It is highly improbable that the election will be held this Sunday. It is a purely technical problem."

The Independent National Electoral Commission said a decision to postpone the election between Jean-Marie Dore, the interim prime minister, and the two candidates, Cellou Dalein Diallo and Alpha Condé, was made because they needed "two weeks to prepare well." They blamed a lack of necessary voting equipment, saying it could take up to two weeks for arrangements to be in place, and that a new date was yet to be decided. The dates of 10 October, and then 24 October, were proposed for the second round, but on 22 October the vote was put off indefinitely.

Siaka Sangare, the new head of the election commission, set 7 November as the new date for the second round of the election "after wide consultation with the different parties in the transition. It is a date that has been agreed upon, cannot be changed, and, dare I say it, I think will be the last one set for this election that the Guinean people are waiting for so much." He added that the election had previously been postponed so as to allow political parties to call for calm following violence.

=== Violence ===
In the week before the second round of voting, at least 24 people were injured in clashes when supporters of Cellou Dalein Diallo and Alpha Condé threw rocks at each other after a campaign rally. The incident occurred in several parts of Conakry, marking a sign of escalating tension ahead of the vote. Brawls were also reported near Conde's home, as well as near his Rally of the Guinean People party headquarters in Hamdallaye. The following day rioting continued killing at least one person and injuring 50.

=== Corruption ===
Vincent Bolloré, a French billionaire close to then-French president Nicolas Sarkozy, allegedly gave financial support to presidential candidate Alpha Condé in the election. He is suspected of having offered Condé discount on advertisements from his ad agency, which he did not equally offer to his opponent Cellou Dalein Diallo. Condé went on to become Guinean president and gave Bolloré's company port concessions. Bolloré formally denies any wrongdoing.

== Results ==
The final results of the first round were announced on 20 July 2010 after confirmation by the Supreme Court, which annulled about one-third of the votes originally cast. While differing significantly from the earlier provisional results, they confirmed a runoff between Cellou Dalein Diallo and Alpha Condé, with Diallo winning 43.69% against Condé's 18.25% and Sidya Touré's 13.02%.

A big turnout was reported for the second round. Early results (from counting in the districts) for the second round indicated a close race, with final results due when all ballots were brought to Conakry for counting. CENI announced the preliminary results on the evening of 15 November, with Condé the winner with 52.52% of the vote on a 67.87% turnout. Earlier in the day, both candidates claimed victory, with Diallo saying that he would not accept the CENI's provisional results until his complaints of election irregularities had been investigated. Voting along ethnic lines had been expected to hurt Diallo.

Candidate	Party	First round		Second round	
Candidate	Party	Votes	%	Votes	%
Cellou Dalein Diallo	Union of Democratic Forces of Guinea	772,496	43.60	1,333,666	47.48
Alpha Condé	Rally of the Guinean People	323,406	18.25	1,474,973	52.52
Sidya Touré	Union of Republican Forces	230,867	13.03		
Lansana Kouyaté	Party of Hope for National Development	124,902	7.05		
Papa Koly Kourouma	Rally for the Defense of the Republic	101,827	5.75		
Ibrahima Abé Sylla	New Generation for the Republic	57,394	3.24		
Jean Marc Telliano	Rally for the Integrated Development of Guinea	41,332	2.33		
Aboubacar Somparé	Unity and Progress Party	16,947	0.96		
Boubacar Barry	National Renewal Party	14,200	0.80		
Ousmane Bah	Union for Progress and Renewal	12,140	0.69		
Ibrahima Kassory Fofana	Guinea for All	11,778	0.66		
Ousmane Kaba	Liberal Party for Unity and Solidarity	9,613	0.54		
François Lonseny Fall	United Front for Democracy and Change	8,207	0.46		
Mamadou Sylla	Democratic Union of Guinea	8,016	0.45		
Hadja Saran Daraba Kaba	Pan-African Democratic Convention	6,815	0.38		
Mamadou Diawara	Workers and Solidarity Party	5,641	0.32		
Boubacar Bah	Democratic Prosperous Future for Guinea	5,354	0.30		
Alpha Ibrahima Keira	Republican Party	4,600	0.26		
M'Bemba Traoré	Democracy and Unity Party	4,292	0.24		
Mamadou Baadiko Bah	Union of Democratic Forces	3,409	0.19		
Joseph Bangoura	Union for the Integrated Development of Guinea	3,247	0.18		
Abraham Bouré	Guinean Rally for Unity and Development	2,179	0.12		
Fodé Mohamed Soumah	Generation of Citizens	1,984	0.11		
Bouna Keita	Rally for a Prosperous Guinea	1,334	0.08		
Total		1,771,980	100.00	2,808,639	100.00
Valid votes		1,771,980	90.90	2,808,639	96.91
Invalid/blank votes		177,416	9.10	89,594	3.09
Total votes		1,949,396	100.00	2,898,233	100.00
Registered voters/turnout		3,778,177	51.60	4,270,531	67.87
Source: ACE Project, African Elections Database

== Aftermath ==
After Condé was preliminarily declared the winner some members of the Fula ethnic group (which largely backed Diallo) rioted, barricading roads and destroyed homes and businesses of some Malinkes (who tended to back Conde).

On 18 November the military declared a state of emergency. Nouhou Thiam, the armed forces chief, read the decree on state television which prohibited civilians from congregating in the streets, while only the military and security personnel would have unrestricted movement. He said the decree would be enforced until the Supreme Court declared certified final results, which was to occur before 24 November.
