= Lamine Sidimé =

Guinean political figure (born 1944)

Lamine Sidimé (born 1944) is a Guinean political figure who was Prime Minister of Guinea from 1999 to 2004.

== Early life ==
Born at Mamou in 1944, Sidimé served as President of the Supreme Court from 1992, and he was appointed as prime minister by President Lansana Conté in March 1999, replacing Sidya Touré. After five years in office, he resigned on February 23, 2004. He then resumed the Presidency of the Supreme Court.

Political offices
Preceded by Sidya Touré	Prime Minister of Guinea; 1999–2004	Succeeded by François Lonseny Fall
