= Rally of the Guinean People =

Political party in Guinea

Rally of the Guinean People Rassemblement du Peuple Guinéen
- Leader: Alpha Condé
- Founded: 1960s (as a political organisation) April 1992 (as a political party)
- Dissolved: 7 March 2026
- Ideology: Social democracy Democratic socialism Progressivism
- Political position: Centre-left to left-wing
- International affiliation: Progressive Alliance; Socialist International

The Rally of the Guinean People (RPG; French: Rassemblement du Peuple Guinéen, sometimes translated as Guinean People's Assembly) was a political party in Guinea. It was the ruling party of Guinea from 2010 to 2021 and was most recently led by former president Alpha Condé. The party draws most of its support from the Mandinka population, the second largest ethnic group in Guinea.

Initially established in 1992 during the military regime of Lansana Conté, the RPG served as the main opposition to the Unity and Progress Party (PUP), the dominant ruling party of the Conté regime. Opposition parties saw limited success in elections during the rule of president Conté, but following Conté's death and the subsequent political instability, the 2010 presidential elections saw the election of RPG candidate Alpha Condé to the presidency. The RPG subsequently took the PUP's place as the ruling party of Guinea, until Condé himself was overthrown in the 2021 Guinean coup d'état.

The party was affiliated with the Progressive Alliance and Socialist International. In 2026, the party was dissolved by the government of president Mamady Doumbouya.

== History ==
The party boycotted the 2002 Guinean parliamentary elections.

Following the dismissal of Lansana Kouyaté as prime minister and his replacement by Ahmed Tidiane Souaré on 20 May 2008, the RPG denounced Kouyaté's dismissal and, unlike other opposition parties, declined to attend a meeting with Souaré on 28 May to discuss the formation of a national unity government. The RPG stated that positive change would not come as long as president Lansana Conté remained in power, regardless of who was prime minister or who was included in the government, and the party refused to participate in the government.

== Electoral history ==
=== Presidential elections ===
Election	Party candidate	Votes	%	Votes	%	Result
Election	Party candidate	First round		Second round		Result
1993	Alpha Condé	407,221	19.55%	–	–	Lost ✗
1998	Alpha Condé	429,934	16.58%	–	–	Lost ✗
2003	Alpha Condé	Boycotted				
2010	Alpha Condé	323,406	18.26%	1,474,973	52.52%	Elected ✓
2015	Alpha Condé	2,285,827	57.85%	–	–	Elected ✓
2020	Alpha Condé	2,438,815	59.49%	–	–	Elected ✓

=== National Assembly elections ===
Election	Party leader	Votes	%	Votes	%	Seats	+/–	Position	Result
Election	Party leader	Constituency		Proportional		Seats	+/–	Position	Result
1995	Alpha Condé	354,927	19.2%			19 / 114	▲19	▲2nd	Opposition
2002	Alpha Condé	Boycotted				0 / 81	▼19	▼ N/A	Extra-parliamentary
2013	Alpha Condé	1,405,585	47.58%	1,468,119	46.26%	53 / 114	▲53	▲1st	Minority government
2020	Alpha Condé	2,417,836	89.05%	1,591,650	55.27%	79 / 114	▲26	1st	Supermajority government
