= Union for the Progress of Guinea =

Political party in Guinea

Union for the Progress of Guinea Union pour le Progrès de la Guinée
- Abbreviation: UPG
- Leader: Jean-Marie Doré
- Dissolved: 2026

The Union for the Progress of Guinea (UPG; French: Union pour le Progrès de la Guinée) is an opposition political party in Guinea. The UPG was led for years by Jean-Marie Doré, who served as Prime Minister of Guinea from January to December 2010. It held one position in the government of Prime Minister Ahmed Tidiane Souaré, which was appointed on 19 June 2008. The party was dissolved in 2026 by the government of president Mamady Doumbouya.

== Electoral history ==
=== Presidential elections ===
Election	Candidate	Votes	%	Result
Election	Candidate	First round		Result
1993	Jean Marie Doré	19,007	0.91%	Lost ✗
1998	Jean Marie Doré	44,746	1.73%	Lost ✗

=== National Assembly elections ===
Election	Party Leader	Votes	%	Votes	%	Seats	+/–	Position	Result
Election	Party Leader	Proportional		Proportional		Seats	+/–	Position	Result
1995	Jean-Marie Doré	44,441	2.40%			2 / 114	▲2	▲5th	Opposition
2002	Jean-Marie Doré	130,065	4.11%			3 / 81	▲1	▲3rd	Opposition
2013	Jean-Marie Doré	54,422	1.71%	73,906	2.44%	2 / 114	▼1	▼5th	Opposition
