= New Democratic Forces (Guinea) =

Political party in Guinea

New Democratic Forces Nouvelles forces démocratiques
- Abbreviation: NFD
- Leader: Mouctar Diallo
- Founded: 2008
- Colours: Brown
- National Assembly: 0 / 114

The New Democratic Forces (French: Nouvelles forces démocratiques; NFD) is a political party in Guinea. The party is led by Mouctar Diallo, who is the current Minister of Youth and Youth Employment. The party won three seats at the 2020 parliamentary election.
