= Union for Progress and Renewal =

Political party in Guinea

Union for Progress and Renewal Union pour le Progrès et le Renouveau
- Abbreviation: UPR
- Leader: Ousmane Bah
- Founders: Siradiou Diallo; Mamadou Boye Bah
- Founded: September 1998; 27 years ago
- Merger of: Renewal and Progress Party; Union for the New Republic

Website
- upr-guinee.org

The Union for Progress and Renewal (UPR; French: Union pour le Progrès et le Renouveau) is an opposition political party in Guinea, founded in September 1998 through the merger of the Renewal and Progress Party of Siradiou Diallo and the Union for the New Republic of Mamadou Boye Bah. The UPR is currently led by Ousmane Bah.

In the parliamentary election held on 30 June 2002, the party won 26.63% of the popular vote and 20 out of 114 seats. A faction of the party boycotted the 2002 election, and this faction later joined the Union of Democratic Forces of Guinea. On 19 June 2008, the UPR joined the government of prime minister Ahmed Tidiane Souaré, receiving one post, that of Minister of Livestock and Animal Protection.

== Electoral history ==
=== Presidential elections ===
| Election | Party candidate | Votes | % | Result |
| Election | Party candidate | First round | | Result |
|---|---|---|---|---|
| 1998 | Mamadou Boye Bah | 638,563 | 24.63% | Lost ✗ |
| 2010 | Ousmane Bah | 12,140 | 0.69% | Lost ✗ |

=== National Assembly elections ===
| Election | Votes | % | Votes | % | Seats | +/– | Position | Result |
| Election | Proportional | | Constituency | | Seats | +/– | Position | Result |
|---|---|---|---|---|---|---|---|---|
| 1995 | 170,806 | 9.24% | | | 9 / 114 | ▲9 | ▲3rd | Opposition |
| 2002 | 842,270 | 26.63% | | | 20 / 81 | ▲11 | ▲2nd | Opposition |
| 2013 | 35,633 | 1.12% | 71,455 | 2.36% | 1 / 114 | ▼19 | ▼8th | Opposition |
| 2020 | 76,512 | 2.66% | 14,597 | 0.54% | 2 / 114 | ▲1 | ▲5th | Opposition |
