= 2003 Guinean presidential election =

- 21 December 2003
- Registered: 5,009,780
- Turnout: 82.76% (▲11.34pp)
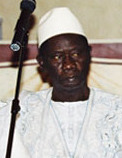

Nominee	Lansana Conté	Mamadou Bhoye Barry
Party	PUP	UNP
Popular vote	3,905,824	178,395
Percentage	95.63%	4.37%
President before election
Lansana Conté
PUP
Elected President
Lansana Conté
PUP

Presidential elections were held in Guinea on 21 December 2003. Incumbent Lansana Conté won over 95.6% of the vote after most opposition parties boycotted the elections.

== Candidates ==
Conté ran for another seven-year term despite serious health problems, including diabetes, which caused some to doubt his ability to continue as President. He was unanimously nominated as the candidate of the ruling Unity and Progress Party (PUP) in September 2003, but he said that he would not participate in campaigning. Demands from the Republican Front for Democratic Change (FRAD) opposition coalition concerning the creation of an independent electoral commission and access to state media were unfulfilled by the government, and consequently all the major opposition leaders chose to boycott the election.

Although the main opposition politicians chose to boycott, six others tried to run but saw their candidacies rejected due to technicalities. Aside from Conté, only one candidate was permitted to run: Mamadou Bhoye Barry of the Union for National Progress. Barry was known as a supporter and friend of Conté; as a veterinarian, he also cared for Conté's livestock. Despite his failing health, Conté was officially certified as being medically fit to stand as a candidate.

== Results ==
With no serious opposition, Conté was re-elected by an overwhelming margin. Turnout was officially placed at 86%, despite the opposition boycott and lack of competition; however, FRAD claimed that turnout was actually less than 15%. Conté was sworn in for his new seven-year term on 19 January 2004 and vowed to fight corruption in a television broadcast on the occasion.

Candidate	Party	Votes	%
Lansana Conté	Unity and Progress Party	3,905,824	95.63
Mamadou Bhoye Barry	Union for National Progress	178,395	4.37
Total		4,084,219	100.00
Valid votes		4,084,219	98.51
Invalid/blank votes		61,808	1.49
Total votes		4,146,027	100.00
Registered voters/turnout		5,009,780	82.76
Source: IFES
