= Lansana Conté =

President of Guinea from 1984 to 2008

General Lansana Conté
- ߟߊ߲߭ߛߣߊ߬ ߞߐ߲ߕߋ߬
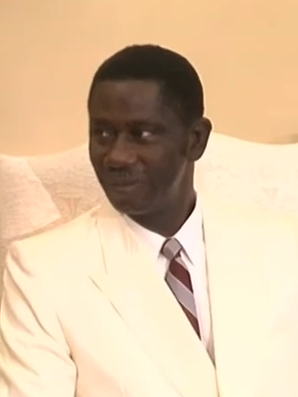
- Conté in 1988

2nd President of Guinea
- In office 3 April 1984 – 22 December 2008
- Prime Minister: Diarra Traoré; Sidya Touré; Lamine Sidimé; François Lonseny Fall; Cellou Dalein Diallo; Eugène Camara; Lansana Kouyaté; Ahmed Tidiane Souaré
- Preceded by: Ahmed Sékou Touré; Louis Lansana Beavogui (acting)
- Succeeded by: Moussa Dadis Camara

Personal details
- Born: 30 November 1934 Dubréka, French Guinea
- Died: 22 December 2008 (aged 74); Conakry, Guinea
- Resting place: Lansanaya
- Party: PUP
- Spouse: Hadja Kadiatou Seth Conté

Military service
- Allegiance: France (1955–1958); Guinea (1958–1991)
- Branch/service: French Army (1955–1958); Guinean Army (1958–1991)
- Years of service: France (1955–1958); Guinea (1958–1991)
- Rank: General

General Lansana Conté (N'Ko: ߟߊ߲߭ߛߣߊ߬ ߞߐ߲ߕߋ߬; 30 November 1934 – 22 December 2008) was a Guinean politician and military officer who served as the second president of Guinea from 1984 until his death in 2008. Conté came to power in the 1984 Guinean coup d'état.

== Early life ==
Born in Moussayah Loumbaya (Dubréka), a member of the Susu ethnic group, he estimated his birthdate to be 1934, although he never knew exactly. Conté was educated at a local Quranic school and attended Dubréka primary school. He then went on to study at military preparatory schools in Bingerville, Côte d'Ivoire and Saint Louis, Senegal.

== Military and government service ==
In 1955, he enlisted in the French Army and was posted to Algeria during the war of independence in 1957. After his service in the French Army, Conté returned to Guinea, which became independent from France on 2 October 1958, and was integrated into the new army with the rank of sergeant. In 1962, he attended the Camp Alpha officers' school in Conakry. Soon after, he was transferred to the 2nd Battalion artillery-training centre in Kindia. On 1 July 1963, he was promoted to Second Lieutenant. This was followed two years later by another promotion from Second Lieutenant to Lieutenant. On 22 November 1970, the Portuguese military, together with Guinean dissidents invaded the country from Portuguese Guinea (now Guinea-Bissau) in an apparent attempt to overthrow the government of President Ahmed Sékou Touré and destroy PAIGC guerrillas. For his service to the nation, he was promoted to the rank of Captain on 27 February 1971. In 1973, he was named commander of the Boké operational zone (in Northwestern Guinea) to assist the pro-independence guerrilla movement, African Party for the Independence of Guinea and Cape Verde (PAIGC) in neighbouring Portuguese Guinea. On 10 May 1975, he was named assistant Chief of Staff of the army.

In 1977, he was head of the Guinean delegation during negotiations that resolved a border dispute with Guinea-Bissau and was elected to the National Assembly in 1980. Later that year, he took part in the ruling Democratic Party of Guinea's (PDG) official pilgrimage to Mecca.

== Presidency ==
=== 1984 coup and military rule ===
President Ahmed Sékou Touré, Guinea's head of state since independence, died on 26 March 1984. Prime Minister Louis Lansana Beavogui was named interim president, pending elections to be held within 45 days. On 3 April, however, hours before the PDG was to choose a new leader—who would have been the only candidate for president—Conté led a military coup that toppled the government. Conté denounced the Touré regime's human rights abuses and released 250 political prisoners. He also encouraged the return of approximately 200,000 Guineans from exile, and the Camp Boiro detention centre was closed down.

The country's constitution was immediately suspended after the takeover, along with the National Assembly, and political activity was banned. A 25-member Military Committee of National Restoration (CMRN) was set up and led by Conté, who on 5 April was proclaimed President of the Republic.

On 4 July 1985, soldiers loyal to Conté, who was attending an Economic Community of West African States (ECOWAS) summit in Lomé, Togo, thwarted a counter-coup. Conté, a member of the Susu people (or Sousou), used the opportunity to eliminate rival soldiers from the Malinké ethnic group, including former Prime Minister Diarra Traoré.

On 3 April 1990, Conté was promoted to the rank of Army General.

=== Economic and political transition ===
Lansana Conté advocated for planned liberalism from 1985 until 1986 even when already advocating for economic liberal policies. Until 1995, the Republic of Guinea still largely operated under a planned economy, but Conté's government began to support free markets and neoliberal reforms as early as 1985 (although corruption remained rampant). Conté's economic reforms, including currency devaluation and reduction of government spending, met with the approval of the International Monetary Fund (IMF), and realignment with Western nations encouraged foreign investments.

He initiated Guinea's transition to civilian, multiparty rule in the early 1990s. A new constitution was approved in a referendum held on 23 December 1990, and the CMRN was disbanded on 16 January 1991. It was replaced by the Transitional Committee for National Recovery (CTRN), a body composed of civilians and military officials. Political parties were legalized in 1992 in preparation for the upcoming elections.

=== Civilian rule ===
The first multi-party presidential election held since independence was conducted on 19 December 1993. Conté, candidate of the newly formed Unity and Progress Party (PUP), won 51.7% of the vote—just barely enough to avoid a runoff. Alpha Condé of the Rally of the Guinean People (RPG) was second with 19.6% of the vote. The opposition alleged electoral fraud, especially after the Supreme Court discounted as invalid the results in two prefectures where Condé of the RPG had received a large majority of the vote.

Despite Conté's stated commitment to democracy, his regime remained authoritarian. However, he had far less power than Touré, and for the most part, his rule was much milder.

Conté's government narrowly survived a 2 February 1996 coup attempt that stemmed from an army mutiny over payment of salaries. Several dozen civilians were killed, and the presidential residence sustained significant damage.

In Guinea's second multi-party presidential election, held on 14 December 1998, Conté won another five-year term with 56.1% of the vote. The polls, although an improvement over the troubled 1993 election, were considered flawed by opposition parties and observers. A November 2001 referendum that lifted presidential term limits and would extend the term in office from five to seven years was supported by 98.4% of the voters. The results, however, were rejected by opposition parties who claimed that the outcome was rigged.

He went on to win a third presidential election held on 21 December 2003 with 95.6% of the vote after all but one of the opposing candidates boycotted the race, expressing their belief that Conté would never allow a fair election. Conté had been in declining health, suffering from diabetes and heart problems, and his ability to serve and survive another full term in office was doubted by many. He was sworn in on 19 January 2004, and in a television broadcast on this occasion, he vowed to fight corruption.

On 19 January 2005, shots were reportedly fired at his motorcade on its way into Conakry in what was apparently a failed assassination attempt. One bodyguard was reportedly wounded. Conté, who was unharmed, went on state radio and television that night to say that he had survived because God had not yet decided it was his time to die. He also mentioned "threats from those who do not wish to see the development of Guinea or those who obey orders given to them from abroad" and vowed that he would "not be manipulated". On the next morning, he made a public appearance to pray. One eyewitness of the shooting told RFI that the attackers had exchanged gunfire with Conte's bodyguards for about four minutes before dropping their weapons and fleeing.

While on a visit to France with his family in 2005, Prime Minister François Lonseny Fall resigned and sought asylum. He complained of corruption and increasing interference from Conté. Fall's successor, Cellou Dalein Diallo, endured until April 2006. Conté failed to appoint a new prime minister until the end of January 2007.

In April 2006, he was flown to Morocco for medical treatment. Most people expected he would not return, but he did. Then, in May 2006, riots in Conakry over the price of rice and fuel led to around twenty deaths as security forces savagely repressed the popular uprising. In August 2006, he was again flown to Switzerland for medical treatment. This time, no crowds met him on his return to Guinea. Meanwhile, Henriette Conté, the President's first wife, was accused of flouting the rule of law and taking advantage of the President's physical and mental incapacity to abuse her power.

In August 2006, Human Rights Watch produced a 30-page report condemning human rights abuses in Guinea, highlighting the power vacuum resulting from the President's ongoing illness, and expressing concern about the future.

In an interview with journalists reported by Guinéenews in October 2006, Lansana Conté said that he intended to stay as president until 2010, which was the end of his seven-year term. Conté also said that he was looking for a replacement who "loves the country and will protect it against its enemies."

In November 2006, Transparency International updated its annual Corruption Index. Guinea under Lansana Conté was then second equal as the most corrupt country in the world (pride of place for corruption going to Haiti). This is a matter of concern for foreign firms intending to invest in Guinea (for example, to exploit its extensive bauxite reserves) as they are unable to operate in Guinea without paying huge bribes to highly placed government officials, but if caught doing so, they may face legal action in their country of origin.

In January 2007, a general nationwide strike was held protesting Conté's continued leadership of the country. The strike continued for over two weeks, during which hundreds of thousands of protesters marched in the streets. Within the first two weeks, savage repression by red-caps (Presidential guards) and other security forces left at least twenty protesters dead. By the end of the strike on 27 January, it was reported that at least 90 protesters had died in violent clashes with police and at least 300 had been injured, according to a local human rights group.

The strike ended following an agreement between Conté and the labor unions, according to which a new Prime Minister would be appointed as head of government; Conté also agreed to lower rice and fuel prices. On 9 February, Conté appointed Eugène Camara, who had been Minister of State for Presidential Affairs since January, as Prime Minister. This was rejected by the opposition, and widespread violence broke out after the appointment. The strike resumed on 12 February, and Conté declared martial law on the same day. On 25 February Conté agreed to a deal to end the strike, and on 26 February he appointed a new Prime Minister, Lansana Kouyaté, from a list of individuals chosen by the unions and representatives of civil society; people returned to work on 27 February. Kouyaté was sworn in on 1 March in a ceremony at which Conté was not present.

In an interview with Agence France-Presse and TV5 on 14 June 2007, Conté asserted that he was still in charge of the country ("I'm the boss, others are my subordinates"), rejected the possibility of a transition, and said that his appointment of a prime minister was not due to pressure and that he was pleased with Kouyaté's performance.

On 5 December 2007, a decree restructuring ministries increased the powers of the Secretary-General of the Presidency at the expense of those of the Prime Minister, and on 3 January 2008, Conté dismissed and replaced Justin Morel Junior, the Minister of Communication and Government Spokesman, without consulting Kouyaté. On 4 January, Kouyaté demanded that Morel be restored to his position, and labour unions announced plans to begin a new "unlimited general strike" on 10 January, demanding that Conté's agreement with the unions be properly implemented and that Morel be restored. On 9 January, the unions withdrew their call for a strike.

In a surprise move, on 20 May 2008, Conté dismissed Kouyaté and replaced him with Ahmed Tidiane Souaré. Kouyaté was widely considered a disappointment in his role as Prime Minister, and his unpopularity meant that his dismissal was not greeted with any major unrest of the kind that led to his appointment a year earlier. Through this dismissal and the appointment of Souaré, who was considered close to Conté, Conté was considered to have strengthened his position.

== Health issues and death ==
In his final years, Conté left the country for medical treatment on numerous occasions, and speculation about his health had long been widespread. Contrary to his usual practice, Conté did not appear on television to mark Tabaski earlier in December 2008, which sparked renewed speculation. At around the same time, a newspaper published a photograph suggesting that Conté was in poor physical condition and having difficulty standing up. The editor of that newspaper was arrested, and the newspaper was required to print a photograph in which Conté looked healthy.

Conté died on 22 December 2008 at 6:45 pm local time, according to a statement read on television by Aboubacar Somparé, the President of the National Assembly, who said he had suffered from "a long illness", but did not specify the cause of death. According to Somparé, Conté "hid his physical suffering" for years "in order to give happiness to Guinea". Somparé requested that the President of the Supreme Court, Lamine Sidimé, declare a vacancy in the Presidency and apply the constitution. Prime Minister Souaré and Diarra Camara, the head of the army, stood alongside Somparé during his announcement. Declaring 40 days of national mourning for Conté, Souaré urged "calm and restraint". He told the army to secure the borders and maintain calm within the country "in homage to the memory of the illustrious late leader". According to the constitution, the President of the National Assembly was to assume the presidency in the event of a vacancy, and a new presidential election was to be held within 60 days.

Six hours after Somparé announced Conté's death, a coup d'état was announced on state media. This statement, read by Captain Moussa Dadis Camara on behalf of a group called the National Council for Democracy and Development (CNDD), said that "the government and the institutions of the Republic have been dissolved". The statement also announced the suspension of the constitution "as well as political and union activity".

Conté's funeral was held in Conakry on 26 December. His body was put on display in the parliament building before being taken to the national stadium, where over 20,000 people were in attendance. Leaders of neighbouring countries were present for the funeral. General Mamadou Ba Toto of the CNDD said at the funeral that "we pray God to give us the courage to continue [Conté's] work of tolerance and peace for the welfare of Guinea". Afterwards, his body was buried in the village of Lansanya in front of his mansion. It was taken out of its coffin and placed into the ground, then covered with handfuls of dirt tossed by mourners. The burial was marked by some disorder, as thousands of mourners tried to reach the grave and security forces formed a cordon around it.

Political offices
Preceded by Louis Lansana Beavogui; Acting	President of Guinea; 1984–2008	Succeeded by Moussa Dadis Camara
