= 2026 in Guinea =

- Decades: 2000s; 2010s; 2020s
- See also: Other events of 2026; Timeline of Guinean history

Events in the year 2026 in Guinea.

== Incumbents ==
- President: Mamady Doumbouya
- Prime Minister: Bah Oury

== Events ==
=== January ===
- 17 January – Mamady Doumbouya is inaugurated as the civilian President of Guinea.
- 23 January – The African Union lifts sanctions imposed on Guinea following the 2021 Guinean coup d'état, citing the transition to civilian rule under the 2025 election.
- 26 January – President Doumbouya reappoints Bah Oury as prime minister.

=== February ===
- 10 February – Aboubakar Sidiki Diakite, a prisoner convicted for his role in the killings of demonstrators in the 2009 Guinean protests, is transferred to a prison in Coyah following a shooting incident at the Conakry central prison.
- 22 February – 16 Sierra Leonean soldiers are detained by Guinean forces along the Guinea–Sierra Leone border in Koudaya, Faranah Region. They are released on 27 February.

=== March ===
- 6 March – The government dissolves 40 political parties by decree, including the three main opposition groups—the Union of Democratic Forces of Guinea, the Rally of the Guinean People, and the Union of Republican Forces—for failing to meet legal requirements, and orders the seizure of their assets.
- 21 March – Eleven individuals of different nationalities are arrested in Siguiri, Mandiana and Kankan on suspicion of belonging to terrorist groups.

=== May ===
- 31 May – 2026 Guinean parliamentary election.

=== June ===
- 29 June – An unspecified vehicle collides with a cargo truck in Mamou Region, killing 15 people and injuring another.

=== August ===
- 23 August – A landslide occurs at a landfill in the Gbessia commune of Conakry, killing 31 people.

=== November ===
- 11 November – Ten people are killed in clashes between protesters and security forces enforcing an artisanal mining ban in Siguiri.

== Holidays ==
- 1 January – New Year's Day
- 27 March – Qadr Night
- 30 March – Korité
- 21 April – Easter Monday
- 1 May – Labour Day
- 25 May – Africa Day
- 6 June – Tabaski
- 15 August – Assumption Day
- 4 September – The Prophet's Birthday
- 2 October – Independence Day
- 25 December – Christmas Day

== Deaths ==
- January 6 – Claude Pivi, 66, military officer.
- March 25 – Toumba Diakité, 57, politician and convicted criminal.
- April 16 – Mamadou Sylla, 66, arms dealer.
- 8 July – Andrée Touré, 91, first lady (1958–1984).
- 25 September – Sidya Touré, 81, prime minister (1996–1999).
