= 2015 in Guinea =

- Decades: 1990s; 2000s; 2010s; 2020s
- See also: Other events of 2015; Timeline of Guinean history

Events in the year 2015 in Guinea.

== Incumbents ==
- President: Alpha Condé
- Prime Minister: Mohamed Said Fofana (until 29 December 2015); Mamady Youla (since 29 December 2015)

== Events ==
- 11 October: Guinean presidential election, 2015:
  - Millions of Guineans vote peacefully in the country's second free election since gaining independence from France nearly 60 years ago.
- 17 October: The Guinea electoral commission reports that the President of Guinea Alpha Conde has won the election with 58 per cent of the vote.
- 31 October: Guinea's constitutional court validates President Alpha Condé's October 11, 2015, re-election victory. The court dismissed complaints lodged by opposition candidates.
- 29 December: For the first time since March 2014, Guinea is declared free from Ebola virus transmissions by the World Health Organization.
