= 2020 in Guinea =

- Decades: 2000s; 2010s; 2020s
- See also: Other events of 2020; Timeline of Guinean history

Events in the year 2020 in Guinea.

== Incumbents ==
- President: Alpha Condé
- Prime Minister: Ibrahima Kassory Fofana

== Events ==
- 13 March - Guinea's first confirmed COVID-19 case was reported. A Belgian national who is an employee of the European Union delegation in Guinea has tested positive for COVID-19.
- 6 September – The Union of Democratic Forces of Guinea (UFDG) nominates former prime minister Cellou Dalein Diallo as president in the October 18 election.
- 15-16 October - Armed gunmen attack the Somoreyah military base in Kindia, Guinea, about 85 km (53 mi) outside of the capital Conakry, killing the camp's commander (Mamady Condé), according to a statement released by the defence ministry. A prison in the city was also attacked, wounding an official there and allowing several inmates to escape.
- 21 October - Clashes in Conakry between police forces and supporters of Cellou Dalein Diallo left at least nine people dead.
- 14 December – President Alpha Conde takes the oath of office for the third time and calls for unity. His term officially begins on December 21.
- 31 December – COVID-19 pandemic in Guinea: Twenty-five senior officials receive the Sputnik V vaccine. Thirty doses remain.

== Deaths ==
- 17 April – Amadou Salif Kebe, head of Guinea's electoral commission; COVID-19
- 18 April – Sékou Kourouma, aide and advisor to President Alpha Condé; COVID-19
- April (date unknown) – Victor Traoré, director of Guinea's Interpol bureau

== See also ==
- 2020 Guinean presidential election
- 2020 Guinean legislative election
- 2020 in West Africa
- COVID-19 pandemic in Guinea
- COVID-19 pandemic in Africa
- List of George Floyd protests outside the United States
