= 2016 in Guinea =

- Decades: 1990s; 2000s; 2010s; 2020s
- See also: Other events of 2016; Timeline of Guinean history

Events in the year 2016 in Guinea.

== Incumbents ==
- President: Alpha Condé
- Prime Minister: Mamady Youla

== Events ==
- 12 February: An attack by suspected Islamist militants on a MINUSMA base in the town of Kidal, northern Mali, kills at least five Guinean United Nationspeacekeepers.

== Deaths ==
- 7 January: Jean-Marie Doré, 77, politician, Prime Minister (2010).
- 13 March: Kaba Rougui Barry, 62, businesswomen and politician, Minister Delegate for Guineans Abroad (2010–2014), Minister of Pre-University, Technical, Vocational Education and Civic Education (2009–2010), and Mayor of Matam (1991–2000).
- 29 March: Maxime Camara, 73, Olympic footballer (1968).
- 7 August: Pierre Bangoura, 77–78, footballer.
