= 2024 in Guinea =

- Decades: 2000s; 2010s; 2020s
- See also: Other events of 2024; Timeline of Guinean history

Events in the year 2024 in Guinea.

== Incumbents ==
- President: Mamady Doumbouya
- Prime Minister: Bernard Goumou (until February 19); Bah Oury (since February 27)

== Events ==
=== February ===
- February 19 - The National Committee of Reconciliation and Development (CNRD) orders the dissolution of the interim government.
- February 25 - ECOWAS lifts the sanctions it imposed on Guinea following the 2021 Guinean coup d'état.
- February 26 - An open-ended general strike is declared by the main trade union confederation demanding the release of Union of Press Professionals of Guinea (SPPG) secretary general Sékou Jamal Pendessa, the lowering of food prices and an end to censorship, leading to a shutdown in Conakry. Two people are killed during clashes with security forces.
- February 27 - The CNRD appoints former opposition leader Bah Oury as prime minister.

=== July ===
- July 31 - A court in Conakry convicts former military leader Moussa Dadis Camara of crimes against humanity over the killings of 157 people in the 2009 Guinean protests and sentences him to 20 years' imprisonment.

=== September ===
- September 19 - Claude Pivi, a military officer who escaped in the 2023 Conakry prison raid and is wanted for his role in the suppression of the 2009 Guinean protests, is extradited to Guinea from Liberia, where he had been arrested on 17 September.
- September 26 - The centre of Conakry is locked down following reports of a shooting near the Presidential Palace by dissident soldiers. However, the CNRD denies that any firing took place.
- September 30 - A minibus plunges into a river near Kissidougou, killing 13 people.

=== October ===
- October 28 - The government orders the dissolution of 53 political parties and places 54 others under observation.

=== December ===
- December 1 - 2024 Nzérékoré stampede: At least 56 people are killed in a crush caused by police opening fire on angry football fans during a match in Nzérékoré.
- December 3 - Investigative journalist Habib Marouane Kamara is abducted by suspected members of the security forces in Conakry.
- December 19 - Former defence minister Mohamed Diané is sentenced to five years' imprisonment for corruption, illicit enrichment, embezzlement, and money laundering.

== Holidays ==
- 1 January - New Year's Day
- 1 April - Easter Monday
- 6 April - Qadr Night
- 10 April - Korité
- 1 May - Labour Day
- 25 May - Africa Day
- 16 June – Tabaski
- 15 August - Assumption Day
- 15 September – The Prophet's Birthday
- 2 October - Independence Day
- 25 December - Christmas Day

== See also ==
- National Assembly (Guinea)
