= Mama Kanny Diallo =

Guinean economist and politician (born 1952)

Minister for Planning and Economic Development
- In office 26 December 2015 – 2018
- Prime Minister: Mamady Youla
- Incumbent
- Assumed office 2018
- Prime Minister: Ibrahima Kassory Fofana

Personal details
- Born: 1952 (age 73–74)
- Spouse: Alpha Condé

Mama Kanny Diallo (born 1952) is an economist and politician from Guinea, who has worked for the International Monetary Fund, the World Bank and the African Development Bank. Since 2015 she has served under two Guinean governments as Minister of Planning and Economic Development.

== Early life and education ==
Diallo was born in Labé, the capital of Middle Guinea, in 1952. She is the daughter of a chief of the Kébali region. From 1983 to 1985 Diallo studied for a Diploma of Advanced Studies (DEA), specializing in finance and international trade, from the American University. Between 1980 and 1981 she also earned an MA in economics from Paris Nanterre University, specialising in international relations and development. In 2004 she was awarded a certificate in financial programming from the International Monetary Fund Institute. In 1999 the African Multilateral Institute awarded her a qualification in sustainable development. In 1992 she was also awarded a certificate in Macroeconomic Management from the Harvard Institute for International Development at Harvard University.

== Career ==
Diallo began her career in 1981 as a technical assistant to the board of directors for Africa of the International Monetary Fund (IMF) in Washington DC. She subsequently worked as a research assistant in the external debt division and in the projections department. She worked in the field of macroeconomic analysis at the World Bank in Washington from 1985 to 1986. From 1995 to 2005, she was the principal economist of the North Region Operations Department (Tunisia, Morocco, Egypt, Sudan, Libya), within the African Development Bank (ADB). From 1986 to 1994, she held several positions in various departments of the ADB, including as senior economist and as program officer. Prior joining the Guinean government, from 2005 to 2015 Diallo was Chief Development Officer of the African Development Institute (ADI), within the African Development Bank (ADB). She has been outspoken about the importance of investment within countries in African, in order to enable young people to stay on the continent and contribute to its growth.

=== Minister of Planning and Economic Development ===
On 26 December 2015, Diallo was appointed as Minister of Planning and Economic Development in the government of Guinea formed by Mamady Youla. Four other women were appointed to the cabinet, including: Malado Kaba, Makalé Camara, Christine Sagno and Oumou Camara. She was reappointed in 2018 in the government of Ibrahima Kassory Fofana. As part of her work to build capacity in Guinea, Diallo raised funds for equipment to enable members of her department to access computer equipment and off-road vehicles. She has also been responsible for Guinea's economic response to the COVID-19 pandemic, as well as recovery after the ebola epidemic. In 2021, she launched Phase II of the National Economic and Social Development Plan (PNDES), which focusses on the development of Guinea's economy through digital transition, as well as support for green and blue economies. Phase I, also administered by Diallo, had included infrastructure projects and well as building agricultural export capacity.

=== Candidacy for Prime Minister ===
In 2020, rumours mounted that Diallo would be a strong contender for the next Prime Minister of Guinea, and if elected she would be the first woman to hold the position.

== Personal life ==
Diallo was married to the President of the Republic of Guinea Alpha Condé from 1973 to 1998.
