= 2013 in Guinea =

- Decades: 1990s; 2000s; 2010s; 2020s
- See also: Other events of 2013; Timeline of Guinean history

The following lists events that happened during 2013 in Guinea.

== Incumbents ==
- President: Alpha Condé
- Prime Minister: Mohamed Said Fofana

== Events ==
- 11 February: Six top Guinean military officials, including the head of the Guinean armed forces, are killed in a plane crash in Liberia.
- 28 September: Voters in Guinea go to the polls for a legislative election.

== Deaths ==
- 11 February: Kelefa Diallo, 53, general, Army chief of staff.
