= 2021 in Guinea =

- Decades: 2000s; 2010s; 2020s
- See also: Other events of 2021; Timeline of Guinean history

Events in the year 2021 in Guinea.

== Incumbents ==
- President: Alpha Condé
- Prime Minister: Ibrahima Kassory Fofana

== Events ==
Ongoing – COVID-19 pandemic in Guinea

- January 12 – Israeli businessman Beny Steinmetz denies corruption or forgery linked to mining rights for Beny Steinmetz Group Resources (BSGR). Swiss prosecutors allege Steinmetz won the mining rights by bribing the wife of former president Lansana Conté (2006–2010).
- January 13 – Two critics of President Alpha Conde are condemned to a year in prison for inciting an insurrection during the 2020 Guinean presidential election campaign.
- February 14 – Guinea declares a new ebola outbreak in Gouécké, Nzérékoré Region. Three people die and four are ill. 14,860 confirmed cases of COVID-19 and 84 deaths have been reported.
- February 20 – Pope Francis accepts the resignation of conservative Cardinal Robert Sarah, 75, from the Vatican′s Congregation for Divine Worship and the Discipline of the Sacraments. As Metropolitan Archbishop of Conakry he was a critic of Islam and of President Ahmed Sékou Touré.
- February 23 – Ebola vaccines donated by the World Health Organization (WHO) are administered in Gouéké, Nzérékoré Prefecture. The WHO has also deployed 65 experts and the UN Central Emergency Response Fund (CERF) has released $15 million to help Guinea and the Democratic Republic of the Congo fight Ebola.
- September 5 - Members of Guinean special forces overthrow incumbent president Alpha Condé from his office and dissolve the Guinean constitution and government.
- September 9 - ECOWAS suspends Guinea from its organization in response to the September 5th coup d'etat.

== Deaths ==
- February 5 – Abdoul Jabbar, 40–41, singer-songwriter.
- March 1 – Emmanuel Félémou, 60, bishop of Roman Catholic Diocese of Kankan (since 2007); COVID-19.
- March 8 – Djibril Tamsir Niane, 89, writer and historian; COVID-19.

== See also ==
- COVID-19 pandemic in Africa
- National Assembly (Guinea)
