= 2023 in Guinea =

- Decades: 2000s; 2010s; 2020s
- See also: Other events of 2023; Timeline of Guinean history

Events in the year 2023 in Guinea.

== Incumbents ==
- President: Mamady Doumbouya
- Prime Minister: Bernard Goumou

== Events ==
Ongoing – COVID-19 pandemic in Guinea

- 4 November – Guinean commando forces forcefully remove former president Moussa Dadis Camara and several other officials from a central prison in Conakry amid gunfire. Camara is later taken back into police custody shortly after the alleged kidnapping attempt.
- 18 December – Conakry oil depot explosion: At least 24 people are killed and another 454 are injured in an explosion at an oil terminal in Conakry.

== Deaths ==
- April 8 – Djene Kaba Condé, 62–63, socialite, first lady (2010–2021).

== See also ==
- COVID-19 pandemic in Africa
- National Assembly (Guinea)
