= 2018 in Guinea =

- Decades: 1990s; 2000s; 2010s; 2020s
- See also: Other events of 2018; Timeline of Guinean history

Events in the year 2018 in Guinea.

== Incumbents ==
- President: Alpha Condé
- Prime Minister: Mamady Youla (until 24 May); Ibrahima Kassory Fofana (from 24 May)

== Events ==
- 24 May – Ibrahima Kassory Fofana takes over as Prime Minister of Guinea
- September – scheduled date for the Guinean legislative election, 2018

== Deaths ==
- 4 January – Papa Camara, footballer (b. 1951).
