= 2019 in Guinea =

- Decades: 1990s; 2000s; 2010s; 2020s
- See also: Other events of 2019; Timeline of Guinean history

Events in the year 2019 in Guinea.

== Incumbents ==
- President: Alpha Condé
- Prime Minister: Ibrahima Kassory Fofana

== Events ==
- Planned – 2019 Guinean legislative election

== Deaths ==
- 4 February – Mohamed Ofei Sylla, footballer (b. 1974).
