= 2022 in Guinea =

- Decades: 2000s; 2010s; 2020s
- See also: Other events of 2022; Timeline of Guinean history

Events in the year 2022 in Guinea.

== Incumbents ==
- President: Mamady Doumbouya
- Prime Minister: Mohamed Béavogui (until July 17); Bernard Goumou onwards

== Events ==
Ongoing – COVID-19 pandemic in Guinea

- January 2 – The United States cuts off Ethiopia, Guinea and Mali from the African Growth and Opportunity Act trade preference program citing their human rights abuses and anti-democratic actions.
- August 18 – A political organization in Guinea accuses military president Mamady Doumbouya of being behind the killings of two youths during anti-government protests yesterday.
- October 23 – 2021 Guinean coup d'état: ECOWAS confirms that Guinea's ruling junta has agreed to restore civilian rule in two years.

== Deaths ==
- January 12 – Aminata Touré, 69, Guinean politician, mayor of Kaloum

== See also ==
- COVID-19 pandemic in Africa
- National Assembly (Guinea)
