= 2025 in Guinea =

- Decades: 2000s; 2010s; 2020s
- See also: Other events of 2025; Timeline of Guinean history

Events in the year 2025 in Guinea.

== Incumbents ==
- President: Mamady Doumbouya
- Prime Minister: Bah Oury

== Events ==
=== January ===
- 29 January – US rail technology firm Wabtec signs a $248M deal for locomotives on the Simandou railway.

=== February ===
- 27 February – Former prime minister Ibrahima Kassory Fofana is convicted by a special court in Conakry of corruption and embezzlement of 15 billion Guinean francs ($1.7 million) in government social welfare programs and is sentenced to five years' imprisonment and a fine of two billion Guinean francs ($230,000).

=== March ===
- 28 March – Imprisoned former president Moussa Dadis Camara, who was convicted over the killing of 156 people during the 2009 Guinean protests, is granted a humanitarian pardon by President Mamady Doumbouya.

=== June ===
- 29 June – The Transitional National Council releases a draft constitution.

=== August ===
- 20 August – At least 11 people are killed in a landslide in Manéah, Coyah Prefecture.
- 23 August – The junta imposes a three-month suspension on the Rally of the Guinean People (RPG), the Union of Democratic Forces of Guinea (UDFG) and the Party of Renewal and Progress (UPR) for failure to fulfill undisclosed requirements.

=== September ===
- 21 September – 2025 Guinean constitutional referendum: Around 90.06% of voters approve a new constitution following a turnout of 91.4%.

=== October ===
- 2 October – Three foreign workers die in an accident at the Simandou iron ore project, prompting a suspension of operations.

=== November ===
- 11 November – The Simandou mine begins operations.

=== December ===
- 28 December – 2025 Guinean presidential election: Mamady Doumbouya is elected to a second term as president with 86.72% of the vote.

== Holidays ==
- 1 January – New Year's Day
- 27 March – Qadr Night
- 30 March – Korité
- 21 April – Easter Monday
- 1 May – Labour Day
- 25 May – Africa Day
- 6 June – Tabaski
- 15 August – Assumption Day
- 4 September – The Prophet's Birthday
- 2 October – Independence Day
- 25 December – Christmas Day

== See also ==
- National Assembly (Guinea)
