= Conakry oil depot explosion =

2023 fatal blaze in Guinea

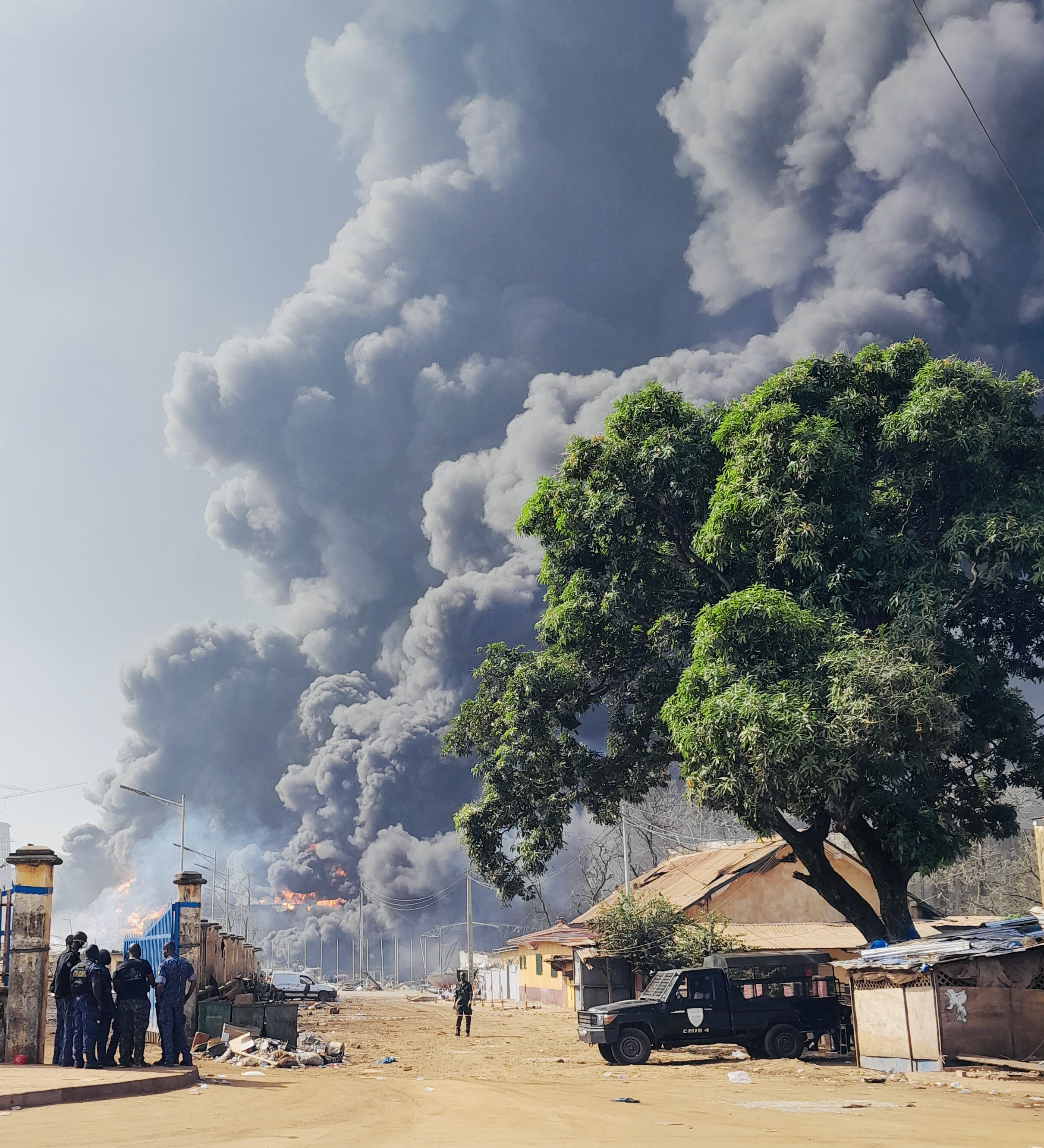
- Date: 18 December 2023
- Location: Kaloum, Conakry, Guinea; 9°31′01″N 13°42′25″W
- Type: Explosion and structure fire
- Deaths: 24
- Injuries: 454

On 18 December 2023, an explosion and fire broke out at an oil depot in Conakry, Guinea, killing at least 24 people and injuring 454 and resulting in fuel shortages across the country.

== Background ==
Guinea does not produce its own petroleum nor does it have a capacity for oil refining, forcing it to rely on imported fuel. This in turn is stored at the main depot of the Guinean Petroleum Company located in the administrative and business district of Kaloum in the capital Conakry, before they are distributed by trucks to the rest of the country, making the facility "strategically very important".

At the time of the disaster, officials were in the process of relocating the depot to a remote site to avoid such an occurrence.

== Events ==
Shortly after midnight on 18 December 2023, an explosion broke out at the depot. Authorities said that the explosion was caused by a fire, whose plumes and smoke could be seen miles away. The fire was brought under control later that afternoon, although a tall column of black smoke remained visible the next day. Authorities said that the fire was completely extinguished nine days later, on 27 December, adding that cooling operations were still ongoing. An employee at the depot said that the explosion occurred while a ship was unloading its cargo, destroying all offices and equipment at the facility.

The government said that the explosion and fire rendered at least 13 fuel tanks in the depot out of service, while five others were unaffected. The explosion also caused damage to about 800 buildings mostly within a radius of 500 metres around the depot and as far as one kilometre away, which included broken windows in the port area of Conakry and significant material and economic damage in Kaloum. The central prison of Conakry in the Coronthie neighborhood was also heavily damaged, and 33 of its inmates were injured, four of them severely. At least 738 households were affected by the disaster.

At least 24 people were killed in the explosion and fire, while 454 others were injured. Some of the fatalities were foreigners. Eight of the dead were described as being in charred condition, while 11 victims remained unidentified by 27 December. At least one casualty was killed by debris flung by the explosion. By 27 December, 423 of the injured had been sent home, while 31 others remained in hospital. Four of the injured were in a serious condition. About 11,000 people were believed to have been directly affected by the disaster.

== Response ==
The government ordered the evacuation of residents in the area and the establishment of facilities for evacuees near the National Assembly building. It also ordered the closure of schools and advised workers to stay home. Several tanker trucks were moved out of the depot under police and military escort as the fire continued. The entire Kaloum district was sealed off except for essential services. A crisis unit led by Prime Minister Bernard Goumou and coordinated by Security Minister Bachir Diallo was established to deal with the disaster. The government distributed 460 survival kits and said that it was intending to distribute such items for up to 2,141 affected households.

The Senegalese defence ministry said it had sent a rescue team that included 15 military doctors and eight firefighting specialists to the scene on 18 December, while the French foreign ministry announced the arrival of an assistance and support team. The United Nations provided tents, water tanks, mobile toilets, medicines and other essential supplies. Mali also sent an emergency team to the site.

In response to fuel shortages brought about by the explosion, Côte d'Ivoire pledged to deliver 50 million liters of gasoline every month to Guinea. Sierra Leone allowed Guinea to use its depots to store its fuel.

== Aftermath ==
The country's military leader, Colonel Mamady Doumbouya, called on citizens "to show solidarity and pray". He later ordered three days of national mourning beginning on 21 December. The government also opened an investigation as to the cause of the disaster. The Attorney-General's office said it was looking into an alleged "willful arson" regarding the incident.

Following the explosion, the government announced the suspension of fuel distribution across the country, leading to the closure of service stations and clashes in Conakry between hundreds of demonstrators, many of them wearing facial coverings and throwing stones and burning tires, and the security forces, who fired tear gas on the protesters. Most of the protestors were described as youths mostly employed as motorcycle taxi drivers demanding the reopening of all gas stations and the resumption of normal fuel distribution. By 21 December, the distribution of diesel fuel had resumed, while petrol, which is more commonly used in the country, remained suspended until 23 December, with limits of up to 25 liters per vehicle and five liters per motorcycle and tricycle and a ban on the usage of cans as fuel containers to prevent their sale in the black market were implemented. Tanker trucks were escorted by police, while residents near the affected areas were advised to wear masks following a deterioration in air quality. More than a week after the disaster, observers noticed a reduction in vehicle traffic in Conakry and across the country while the capital's main market of Madina was mostly closed.

The government also warned of possible electricity shortages, as most power plants in the country are also reliant on petrol. A Reuters correspondent noted that the cost of a litre of petrol had risen by 150% from its usual pump price of 12,000 Guinean francs to 30,000 Guinean francs ($3.50) on the black market.

In Mamou, 260 kilometers from Conakry, gas stations were besieged by residents. In Conakry, the cost of travelling between the city center and the suburbs was reported to have risen from $5 to $32, while the value of the Guinean franc dropped sharply on black market currency exchanges. An economist estimated that due to the disaster and the accompanying economic crisis, inflation in Guinea could reach up to 10% in December, while the inflation rate in Conakry could reach 15%, adding that national transportation costs had risen by an average of 60%. The National Statistics Institute estimated that the events would cause the Guinean economy to contract by 0.7% in 2023.

== Reactions ==
President of the African Union Commission Moussa Faki Mahamat expressed condolences to the victims. ECOWAS called on member countries and the international community to provide support to Guinea. Pope Francis expressed his closeness to the families of the victims in his weekly general audience on 20 December.

Amnesty International and other human rights groups voiced concern about restrictions imposed against private media outlets and social media during the disaster.

== See also ==
- List of building or structure fires
- List of explosions
