= 2013 Guinean parliamentary election =

← 2002	28 September 2013	2020 →
- All 114 seats in the National Assembly
Party	Leader	Vote %	Seats	+/–
RPG	Alpha Condé	46.26	53	New
UFDG	Cellou Dalein Diallo	30.48	37	New
UFR	Sidya Touré	7.00	10	New
PEDN	Lansana Kouyaté	2.55	2	New
UPG	Jean-Marie Doré	1.71	2	−1
RDIG	Jean Marc Telliano	1.62	1	New
GPT	Ibrahima Kassory Fofana	1.47	1	New
UPR	Ousmane Bah	1.12	1	−19
UGDD	Holomo Koni Kourouma	1.09	1	New
PTS	Mamadou Diawara	1.04	1	New
NGR	Daouda Camara	0.80	1	New
PGRP	Alpha Sila Bah	0.65	1	New
GUD	Sekou Benna Camara	0.62	1	New
GRUP	El Hadj Diao Kante	0.58	1	New
PNR	Alpha Souleymane Bah	0.56	1	+1
This lists parties that won seats. See the complete results below.

Parliamentary elections were held in Guinea on 28 September 2013 after numerous delays and postponements. President Alpha Condé's party, the Rally of the Guinean People (RPG) emerged as the largest party in the National Assembly with 53 of the 114 seats. Parties allied with the RDG won seven seats and opposition parties won the remaining 53 seats. Opposition leaders denounced the official results as fraudulent.

== Date ==
The election was originally planned to be held in June 2007, but was postponed to December 2007 due to a general strike in January and February, which resulted in the appointment of a new government and Prime Minister. It was, however, subsequently considered likely that the election would be postponed another time to around March 2008 due to delays in setting up the Independent National Electoral Commission (CENI) and the need for revision of electoral lists. A date for the election in November or December 2008 has been proposed.

On 11 October 2007, Prime Minister Lansana Kouyaté expressed regret regarding slowness in the organization of the election and said that it would be difficult to hold the election by December. Political parties had difficulty reaching an agreement on how many members should be on CENI. CENI was established in November 2007.

On 12 February 2008, an ad hoc commission responsible for determining a timetable for the election proposed that it be held between 23 November and 14 December 2008.

Following the replacement of Kouyaté by Ahmed Tidiane Souaré in May 2008, the International Crisis Group released a report on 23 June 2008 expressing doubt about the likelihood of the election being held before the end of 2008. This report expressed concern that a delay might "compromise economic revival and bury the independent commission of inquiry tasked with identifying and prosecuting authors of the 2007 crackdown". CENI President Chiekh Fantamady Condé said that he was "convinced" that the election would be held in 2008, however.

Ben Sékou Sylla, the President of CENI, announced on 20 October 2008, that the election was being delayed and would be held in the second half of March 2009 at the earliest. He cited difficulties with biometric voter registration, as well as a "delay in setting up structures to register voters and supervise the elections" and a "delay in funding". Sidya Touré of the Union of Republican Forces, an opposition party, denounced the decision as "a political delay, not a technical one"; he also claimed that the government was unwilling to finance CENI and was inhibiting CENI's work. Touré warned against any further delay, saying that it would "lead to further despair and fresh protests". Sekou Konate, the Secretary-General of the governing Party of Unity and Progress (PUP), reacted positively to the delay: "People prefer a delay much more than having war straight away. If we do not have a clean electoral roll, we risk having things go wrong." According to Konate, holding the parliamentary election together with the 2009 local elections or the 2010 presidential election was out of the question.

On 19 December 2008, it was announced that the election would be held on 31 May 2009. After the military coup d'état in December 2008, civilian and political groups proposed to hold them in November 2009, before presidential elections that were planned for December 2009 (although later delayed to 2010). The government set them for 11 October 2009 in late March 2009. The election was then again delayed until 16 March 2010.

Following a political agreement and the 2010 presidential election, the parliamentary election was delayed again. In September 2011, the election date was announced as 29 December 2011. but in early December it was postponed again for security reasons and lack of organization until July 2012. In April 2012, the election was postponed indefinitely by Guinea President Alpha Condé.

After a reshuffle in the Electoral Commission, the election was announced to be planned for 12 May 2013. They were later delayed to 30 June and then to 28 July. The date was moved again in early July, to 24 September, following a UN-mandated agreement between the parties. On 19 September, opposition leader Diallo called protests for Monday, 23 September, complaining of irregularities in voter lists and polling stations that would be impossible to fix before the 24 September elections. On 21 September, the UN mediator for Guinea announced a further delay to 28 September following talks between the parties, and the opposition cancelled their scheduled protests.

== Registration ==
In preparation for voter registration that is needed for the revision of the voter rolls, an awareness campaign regarding registration was launched on 20 May 2008.

CENI President Condé said in June 2008 that the voter registration process, which was being undertaken by CENI and the Ministry of the Interior, would be complete by August. This election will be the first in Guinea to use biometric registration, involving the fingerprints and photographs of voters.

Although registration was scheduled to begin on 15 July 2008, it was subsequently delayed to 1 August in mid-July. This delay was attributed to political instability in May and June 2008 and associated financial difficulties. The process is planned to take place over the course of two months and will be conducted by 2,100 agents. In early August, the start of registration was again delayed.

== Funding and international involvement ==
In October 2007, the budget for the election was placed at about 79 billion Guinean francs, with about 18 billion coming from the government and foreign aid required for the remainder. As of June 2008, the government had contributed 26% of the total; the European Union had contributed $6.2 million, while the Economic Community of West African States (ECOWAS) had contributed $500,000 and France had contributed $155,600 (sums in United States dollars). Germany has also said that it would contribute. Many feel that the Guinean government is relying excessively on donors and should pay for a larger portion of the budget.

In July 2008, the electoral budget was placed at 146 billion Guinean francs, having been increased from an earlier figure of 132 billion Guinean francs.

Said Djinnit, the Special Representative of the United Nations Secretary-General in West Africa, met with CENI on 18 August as part of a visit to review Guinea's progress in electoral preparations, political dialogue, and security. Djinnit gave a public assurance that the UN would do everything it could to assist in preparations for the election.

It was reported in late August that about three billion Guinean francs would be provided to parties by the government for campaign purposes, although 90% of this money would go to parties already represented in the National Assembly, such as the governing PUP, the opposition Union for Progress and Renewal (UPR), and the opposition Union for the Progress of Guinea (UPG).

== Credibility and participation ==
According to CENI President Condé, past electoral fraud caused many people to lose faith in voting, and he emphasized the importance of ensuring transparency and encouraging participation so that the election would be credible.

All political parties were represented on CENI. According to CENI's Ben Sékou Sylla, speaking in October 2008, the election would the first to be held without an opposition boycott.

== Protests ==
In early 2013, protests against the government by those in the opposition who feared a rigged election left over 50 people dead. The opposition demanded that Waymark, a South African firm contracted to revise voter lists, be replaced because of allegedly inflated voter lists. It also said expatriate Guineans should be allowed to vote. On 29 May, President Alpha Conde announced a judicial investigation into protests the prior week that killed at least 12 people. He also replaced Interior Minister Mouramany Cisse with Guinean Ambassador to Senegal Madifing Diane. Ethnic clashes continued in July leading to over 50 deaths. In September, a police officer was killed and 49 people injured in clashes in the capital Conakry.

== Results ==
The election was finally held on 28 September 2013. Official results were announced three weeks later on 18 October. The RPG won 53 of the 114, failing to achieve an outright majority, although its allies won an additional seven seats. The main opposition party, Cellou Dalein Diallo's Union of Democratic Forces of Guinea (UFDG), won 37 seats, while another opposition party, Sidya Toure's Union of Republican Forces (UFR), won 10 seats. In total opposition parties won 53 seats and opposition leaders denounced the results as fraudulent.

Party	Proportional			Constituency			Total seats
Party	Votes	%	Seats	Votes	%	Seats	Total seats
Rally of the Guinean People	1,468,119	46.26	35	1,451,255	47.95	18	53
Union of Democratic Forces of Guinea	967,173	30.48	23	711,393	23.51	14	37
Union of Republican Forces	222,101	7.00	5	337,312	11.15	5	10
Party of Hope for National Development	81,041	2.55	2	84,571	2.79	0	2
Union for the Progress of Guinea	54,422	1.71	1	73,906	2.44	1	2
Rally for the Integral Development of Guinea	51,287	1.62	1	62,489	2.06	0	1
Guinea For All	46,673	1.47	1	77,654	2.57	0	1
Union for Progress and Renewal	35,633	1.12	1	71,455	2.36	0	1
Guinean Union for Democracy and Development	34,592	1.09	1	3,890	0.13	0	1
Work and Solidarity Party	32,934	1.04	1	8,806	0.29	0	1
New Generation for the Republic	25,538	0.80	1	35,978	1.19	0	1
Guinean Party for Renaissance and Progress	20,759	0.65	1	3,819	0.13	0	1
Guinea United for Development	19,814	0.62	1				1
Generation for Reconciliation, Union and Prosperity	18,561	0.58	1	21,116	0.70	0	1
National Party for Renewal	17,671	0.56	1				1
People's Party of Guinea	15,844	0.50	0				0
Unity and Progress Party	13,503	0.43	0				0
Union of Democratic Forces	13,346	0.42	0	9,651	0.32	0	0
Union for the New Republic	10,722	0.34	0	1,514	0.05	0	0
Democratic Party of Guinea – African Democratic Rally	10,539	0.33	0	19,603	0.65	0	0
AFIA	7,910	0.25	0	16,124	0.53	0	0
ADC–BOC	5,202	0.16	0	6,382	0.21	0	0
PUSG				15,033	0.50	0	0
PDP				4,570	0.15	0	0
UNED				3,459	0.11	0	0
GRD				1,966	0.06	0	0
FRONDEG				1,275	0.04	0	0
DG				1,234	0.04	0	0
Rally for a Prosperous Guinea				1,127	0.04	0	0
Citizen Generation				564	0.02	0	0
Guinean Rally for Unity and Development				204	0.01	0	0
Total	3,173,384	100.00	76	3,026,350	100.00	38	114
Valid votes	3,173,384	94.57		3,026,350	91.40		
Invalid/blank votes	182,058	5.43		284,825	8.60		
Total votes	3,355,442	100.00		3,311,175	100.00		
Registered voters/turnout	5,212,539	64.37		5,211,965	63.53		
Source: CENI, CENI, Election Passport

== Aftermath ==
Claude Kory Kondiano, an RPG deputy, was elected President of the National Assembly on 13 January 2014. He received 64 out of 113 votes; one deputy cast a spoilt vote.
