= 2007 in Guinea =

- Decades: 1980s; 1990s; 2000s; 2010s; 2020s
- See also: Other events of 2007; Timeline of Guinean history

The following lists events that happened during 2007 in the Republic of Guinea.

== Events ==
=== January ===
- January 10 - A general strike starts in Guinea, with trade unions calling for pay rises, the return to jail of Mamadou Sylla and the resignation of President Lansana Conté.

=== February ===
- February 22 - President Lansana Conté appoints Lansana Kouyaté as the new prime minister of Guinea after reaching an agreement with the trade union movement and the Opposition.

=== March ===
- March 28 - Lansana Conté names a new government led by Lansana Kouyaté.
