= 2013 Guinea clashes =

Protest in Guinea

Date	February – March 2013
Location	Guinea
Result	Alpha Condé wins the 2013 Guinean legislative election

Belligerents
Fulani rioters	Mandinka rioters

Casualties and losses
- 98 dead, 220 injured

There were two waves of violence in Guinea in 2013, first in February and March, then in July. Nine civilians died in political violence in Guinea in February 2013, after protesters took to the streets to voice their concerns over the transparency of the 2013 election. The demonstrations were fuelled by the opposition coalition's decision to withdraw from the electoral process in protest at the lack of transparency in the preparations for the election. Nine people were killed during the protests in early 2013, while around 220 were injured, and many of the deaths and injuries were caused by security forces using live fire on protesters.

In July 2013, there was ethno-religious fighting between the Fula (along with Guerzé (Kpelle)) and Malinké (along with Konianke) people, the latter forming the base of support for President Alpha Condé, with the former consisting mainly of the opposition. The July violence left 98 dead.

== Background ==
The run-up to the September 2013 election was full of controversy, with the process facing many delays. The parliamentary poll had originally been scheduled for 2011, but was postponed four times until 12 May 2013 was agreed. The election was intended to be the last step in the country's transition to civilian rule after two years under a violent army junta following the death of leader Lansana Conté in 2008. However, it was once again rescheduled, this time until September.

In September 2012, there were many complaints about the government's arbitrary arrest of protesting opposition supporters, 100 of whom were detained that month. This prompted the resignation of two Guinean opposition ministers. The president of the country's national election commission, Louceny Camara, was also forced to step down after numerous demands for his sacking; Camara was seen as a keen ally of President Condé and was accused of helping to pre-rig the legislative polls in Condé's favour. Additionally, Guinean opposition parties announced that they would no longer participate in the National Transitional Council, which serves as an interim parliament, and would also boycott the national electoral commission.

The main cause of the political protests was the decision by the Guinean opposition coalition to withdraw from the electoral process on 24 February, which was followed by an appeal to citizens to stage nationwide protests. This decision was provoked in part by the National Electoral Commission's approval of South African software firm Waymark Infotech in compiling a new list of registered voters for the elections. The opposition argued that the firm is "open to voting fraud" as it was chosen by the ruling party and has a history of discrepancies in elections not just in Guinea but also in other African countries. In September 2012, thousands of Guineans marched in Conakry in protest against Waymark, only to be dispersed by police with tear gas.

The indigenous Guerzé are mostly Christian or animist, while the Konianke are newer immigrants to the region who are Muslims and considered to be close to Liberia's Mandingo ethnic community. The former are seen as being supportive of Liberian President Charles Taylor, while the former fought with rebels against the government in the Liberian civil war.

== Protest and violence ==
Protests began on 27 February 2013 after the opposition coalition began to encourage and stage protests in the capital, Conakry. Thousands of pro-opposition supporters took to the streets and clashes broke out between rock-throwing youths and security forces armed with truncheons, guns, and tear-gas grenades. Around 130 people were injured on the first day, including 68 police. Police in anti-riot gear were posted in opposition strongholds in the capital the following day, with the first death reported that day. On Friday, the interethnic clashes commenced, with the pro-opposition Fula and the pro-government Malinké people fighting with knives and truncheons on the streets of the capital.

The violence worsened at the weekend after a teenager was shot by soldiers who opened fire indiscriminately on a street full of protesters in Conakry, injuring several others. The fifteen-year-old was reportedly on his way to buy bread when he was shot at point blank range, along with 13 others who were allegedly not protesting at all, according to one witness. Two further reported deaths that weekend were also caused by gunfire.

On 4 March, the violence showed no signs of abating, with further clashes between protesters and government security forces leading to more dead and injured from gunfire, bringing the death toll to five people. The violence also spread to another city, Labé, a region known for its allegiance to opposition leader Cellou Dalein Diallo, 450 km from the capital. On Tuesday, two private radio stations, Planet FM and Renaissance FM, were attacked during the violence, in an incident that was condemned by The International Federation of Journalists.

Shots were fired at parts of Planet FM's recording studio as an opposition leader was being interviewed, while other acts of violence targeted the premises of Renaissance FM at night. No one claimed responsibility for the attacks. By Wednesday, 6 March, the death toll had reached eight people after two more deaths the previous day, with violence reportedly reaching more towns in the country's interior.

Several weeks after the initial violence, reports also materialised of violence against another radio station, Lynx FM, with journalists revealing that supporters of the ruling party had threatened a reporter from the station on 27 February. The militants reportedly called her a spy and threatened to attack her on the grounds that she belonged to the Fula ethnic group, and shortly afterwards, she was forced to flee, with a colleague, from a violent, stone-throwing mob. A third reporter with Lynx FM, Asmaou Diallo, was assaulted by unknown assailants outside the RPG office despite wearing a press vest. She said the attackers slapped her after someone said she was an "opposition journalist".

Further tension was seen in the week after the riots, when thousands of opposition supporters marched in Conakry to mark the funerals of the nine people who died during the protests. Former Prime Minister Celou Dalein Diallo, now an opposition leader, gave a speech at the event, urging solidarity and unity after a week of violence. Despite the peaceful proceedings, security forces fired warning shots and tear gas to disperse the crowds, with one resident claiming that shots were still heard even after the crowds had left.

=== Renewed clashes (July 2013) ===
In the southern forest region, petrol-pump security guards of the Guerzé (Kpelle) ethnic group in Koule beat to death a Konianke youth who they accused of stealing on 15 July. Fighting then spread to the provincial capital Nzérékoré resulting in 80 people wounded and several homes destroyed. Though security forces were deployed to quell the fighting, and despite Nzérékoré Prefect Aboubacar Mbop Camara announcing a curfew, fighting initially continued. People were attacked with machetes, axes, sticks, stones, and firearms as houses and cars were burnt. Guerzé chief Molou Holamou Azaly Zogbelemou was also among those wounded. The initial death toll was put at 16, but rose through 17 July as bodies were collected from the streets and were put in the mortuary, even without identification due to the absence of limbs and identity papers. A medic from the hospital where the mortuary was located said that after all the victims were identified, deaths from both communities resulted from being either burned alive or hacked to death.

After the deployments of troops to quell three days of violence, government spokesman Damantang Albert Camara said: "We're now doing a triage to find out who did what. Some were arrested with machetes or clubs but others had (hunting rifles) and military weapons." He also said that "we are today at around 100 dead – 76 victims in N'Zerekore and 22 others in Koule," while at least 160 more people were injured. The violence also followed an agreement by opposing political parties to hold the election on 24 September after street protests that sometimes resulted in ethnic clashes.

== Government reaction ==
President Alpha Condé and the government appealed for calm throughout the violence, but they gave no official death toll to the media. The government said on 2 March that it would investigate whether the security forces had used live rounds on civilians.

Condé was in Ivory Coast at the time of the protests and flew back for talks with the opposition. This meeting, which would discuss the preparations for the May vote, was boycotted by the majority of the opposition, prompting further clashes.

Eventually, on 7 March, the Guinean government bowed to popular demand and postponed the 12 May election "until further notice", upon the recommendations of the National Independent Electoral Commission (CENI). In a press statement, the Prime Minister Mohamed Said Fofana asserted the commitment of the government to spare no effort to ease political tensions, with pledges of free and fair elections.

On 10 March, a Guinean court ordered opposition leaders to appear at a hearing scheduled for 14 March, in which they would be questioned for their role in organizing the protests. A government spokesman told Reuters that they would be facing a "civil procedure", following President Condé's call for those responsible for the violence and the pillaging of businesses to be brought to justice. Former Prime Minister Sidya Toure branded the summons as an "illegal procedure for what was an authorised march" and a "manipulation of justice for political ends".

The Guinean government also agreed to suspend poll preparations, prompting the opposition's agreement on 15 March to take part in preliminary talks to end the deadlock over the elections. Days later, however, the opposition were to be found appealing for an international effort to help organize the legislative polls after a "painful" dialogue with the government. Opposition leader Cellou Dalein Diallo blamed Interior Minister Alhassane Condé for the "mistrust between us and the government".

== International reaction ==
On 2 March, the African Union announced it was deeply concerned about recent political developments in the country "that have degenerated into street clashes and violence and saw the loss of lives and destruction of property". Its chairperson strongly urged all stakeholders to remain calm and engage in genuine dialogue on the way forward.

On 5 March, the European Union voiced concerns over the political unrest, and urged all concerned parties to "show restraint and resolve differences through a national dialogue".

The United Nations human rights office and secretary general Ban Ki-moon both denounced the violence in Guinea and called on authorities "to protect civilians and ensure all parties refrain from using violence to resolve disputes".

== Casualties ==
=== March 2013 ===
March 1–6: 8 civilians killed in protests.

=== July 2013 ===
July 14–24: 98 people killed in sectarian violence.
