= Guinean syli =

1971–1985 currency of Guinea

syli guinéen (French)
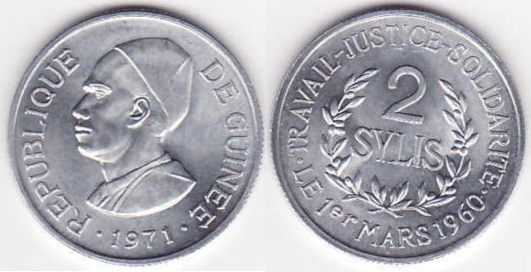
2 sylis coin of 1971
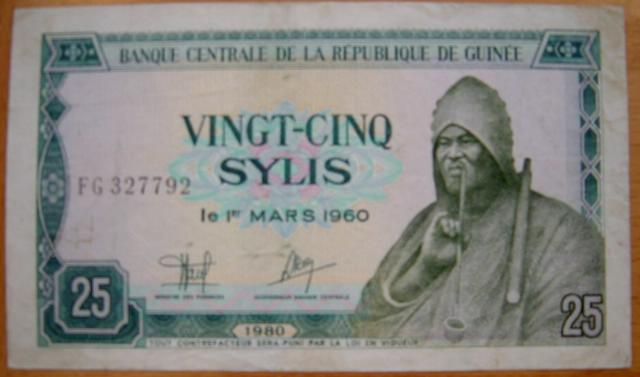
25 syli Banknote

ISO 4217
- Code: GNS; GNE

Denominations
- Subunit
- 1/100: cauri
- Banknotes: 1, 2, 5, 10, 25, 50, 100, 500 sylis
- Coins: 50 cauris, 1, 2, 5 sylis

Demographics
- User(s): Guinea

Issuance
- Central bank: Central Bank of the Republic of Guinea
- Website: www.bcrg-guinee.org
- This infobox shows the latest status before this currency was rendered obsolete.

The syli was the currency of Guinea between 1971 and 1985. It was subdivided into 100 cauris. The Sosso word syli means "elephant", while cauri refers to the shells formerly used as currency. The syli replaced the Guinean franc at a rate of 1 syli = 10 francs.

Coins of 50 cauris, 1, 2 and 5 sylis were made of aluminium. Banknotes of the 1971 series were issued in denominations of 10, 25, 50 and 100 sylis. A second series of banknotes was issued in 1980, this time in different colours and with four additional denominations – 1, 2, 5 and 500 sylis notes.

The syli was replaced by the franc guinéen in 1985 at par.

== Banknotes ==
1971 notes
| Image | Value | Main Colour | Obverse | Reverse | Date of issue |
|---|---|---|---|---|---|
| | 10 sylis | Brown | Patrice Lumumba | People with bananas | 1971 |
| | 25 sylis | Dark brown | King Béhanzin of Dahomey | Man and cows | 1971 |
| | 50 sylis | Green | Alpha Yaya Diallo (King of Labé) | Kinkon hydroelectric plant | 1971 |
| | 100 sylis | Violet | Samori Ture | Steam shovel and two dump trucks | 1971 |
1980 notes
| | 1 syli | Olive green | Mafory Bangoura | text "un syli" | 1980 |
| | 2 sylis | Orange | King Mohammed V of Morocco | text "deux sylis" | 1980 |
| | 5 sylis | Blue | Kwame Nkrumah | People with bananas | 1980 |
| | 10 sylis | Red | Patrice Lumumba | People with bananas | 1980 |
| | 25 sylis | Dark gren | King Behazin of Dahomey | Man and cows | 1980 |
| | 50 sylis | Dark brown | Alpha Yaya Diallo (King of Labé) | Kinkon hydroelectric plant | 1980 |
| | 100 sylis | Blue | Samori Ture | Steam shovel and two dump trucks | 1980 |
| | 500 sylis | Dark brown | Josip Broz Tito | People's Palace, Conakry | 1980 |
For table standards, see the banknote specification table.
