= 2023 Conakry prison raid =

2023 prison raid in Guinea

Date	4 November 2023; 2 years ago
Location	Maison Centrale de Conakry, Conakry, Guinea 9°30′49″N 13°42′19″W
Result	Moïse Dadis Camara is briefly broken out of prison, but is recaptured hours later

Belligerents
Guinean Armed Forces; National Police Force	Armed commandos

Casualties and losses
4 killed Unknown injured	3 killed Unknown injured
- 2 civilians killed
- Maison Centrale de Conakry, the prison where the raid took place

On 4 November 2023, armed men raided the Maison Centrale de Conakry prison and broke out former President of Guinea Moïse Dadis Camara and three other officials. The raid killed nine people and injured six others.

Camara and two other prisoners were re-arrested hours after the incident.

== Background ==
Camara seized power on 23 December in the 2008 Guinean coup d'état, which occurred shortly after the death of former president Lansana Conté.

In 2009, protests erupted against Camara's junta. When protesters gathered at a large stadium, security forces opened fire, killing 157 and injuring over 1,000.

On 27 September 2022, Camara was imprisoned and tried for the 2009 massacre along with 10 other former military and government officials.

== Prison raid ==
At around 0500 GMT, heavily armed men allegedly led by the son of Claude Pivi broke into the Maison Centrale de Conakry prison. Gunfire was heard throughout Kaloum as the raid took place. The intruders broke out Camara, Pivi, Blaise Goumou, and Moussa Thiégboro Camara. Nine people were killed during the raid, including at least three intruders and four members of Guinea's defense force. Two people, presumed to be civilians who had been in an ambulance at the time of the raid, also died. Six other people were also treated for gunshot wounds. The prison was secured by Guinea's military after the raid, and the government stated that the situation was "under control".

== Manhunt ==
Immediately after the incident, authorities started a nationwide manhunt to recapture the escaped prisoners. Hours later, Camara, and two others were recaptured and brought back to prison. Claude Pivi remained on the run, and Guinean authorities offered a reward of 500 million Guinean francs to anyone who facilitated his arrest. Security forces closely checked vehicles entering the government district of Conakry, searching for Pivi and potential weapons.

On 17 September 2024, Pivi was arrested in Libera and extradited to Guinea on 19 September.

== Aftermath ==
In the aftermath of the incident, Guinean security forces blocked access to numerous locations in Conakry, primarily in the Kaloum district. Soldiers reportedly patrolled the streets of Conakry in armored vehicles, and armed officers checked passing cars searching for the escapees. Guinea's borders were reportedly closed, and disruptions occurred at Ahmed Sekou Toure International Airport since air traffic control staff were unable to travel to the airport due to roadblocks.

Guinean junta leader Mamady Doumbouya announced that he had fired over 60 soldiers and prison officers for “breach of employment and misconduct” as a result of the event.

Camara's trial resumed on 13 November.

== Reactions ==
The incident highlighted the fragile security situation in Guinea, and gunfire that resulted from the raid initially sparked fears of another coup d’état attempt.

Camara's lawyer alleged that Camara was an unwilling participant in the jailbreak, and that he was kidnapped by force.

Guinea's army described the operation as an attempt to "sabotage" government reforms and swore its "unwavering commitment" to the current military-led authorities.
