= Sékou Jamal Pendessa =

Guinean journalist

- Citizenship: Guinea
- Occupation(s): Journalist; Trade unionist
- Organization: Union of Press Professionals of Guinea
- Criminal charges: Participation in an unauthorised demonstration Publication of information likely to disturb public security
- Criminal penalty: 6 months imprisonment
- Criminal status: Released

Sékou Jamal Pendessa is a Guinean journalist and trade unionist. He is the secretary-general of the Union of Press Professionals of Guinea (French: Syndicat des professionnels de la presse de Guinée, SPPG). His arrest in 2024 for calling for a demonstration led to a general strike being called by the Guinean Trade Union Movement.

== Career ==
A trained journalist, Pendessa was elected to serve as the secretary-general of the SPPG, a trade union representing journalists in Guinea.

== 2024 arrest and detention ==
In December 2023, Pendessa called for there to be a demonstration to protest restrictions placed on social media and the censorship of news websites and radio stations by the National Committee of Reconciliation and Development, the military junta that had ruled Guinea since the 2021 coup d'état. During a planned demonstration on 18 January 2023, the House of the Press, an independent media outlet in the Guinean capital Conakry, was besieged by security forces for several hours, trapping 30 journalists inside, including Pendessa; in total, nine journalists were arrested, though Pendessa was not one of them. The arrested journalists were released the next day.

On 19 January 2024, Pendessa was arrested as he was returning home from the Dixinn Court of First Instance, where he had gone to support journalists who had been arrested at the House of the Press the previous day. He was detained by the Kipé Investigation Unit for three days before being presented at the Dixinn Court, where he was charged with "participation in an unauthorised demonstration on a public highway" and "publication of information likely to disturb public security and order". Pendessa was ordered to be remanded until his trial and was transferred to a prison in Conakry. During his hearing, the Justice Minister Alphonse Charles Wright visited the courtroom; while it was reported he was there for a pre-planned inspection, the SPGG raised concerns that Wright had influenced the judge's decision to charge and remand Pendessa.

Pendessa's trial started on 20 February 2024 and concluded on 23 February. The day before his sentencing, the Guinean Trade Union Movement, representing thirteen trade unions in Guinea including the SPPG, issued a statement confirming it intended to call for a general strike to begin on 26 February if Pendessa was convicted. Its other demands included a reduction in food prices, an end to media censorship, and improved living conditions for civil servants.

On 23 February 2024, Pendessa was sentenced to six months' imprisonment, with three months suspended; he was also fined 500, 000 GNF. Pendessa's lawyer, Salifou Beavogui, described Pendessa as "another innocent man being imprisoned" and stated that no laws had been broken at the gathering at the House of the Press. He described the judge as being "incompetent".

On 26 February 2024, a general strike began on the order of the Guinean Trade Union Movement. The strike was described as "paralysing" Conakry and slowing down other parts of the country, with many banks, shops, schools and offices not opening, and public transport being grounded.

On 28 February 2024, the third day of the general strike, Pendessa's appeal hearing was heard, following which his sentence was reduced to one month, allowing him to be immediately released on time served. Pendessa released a statement describing his release as "a victory for democracy, of justice and against injustice, of justice against the arbitrary". That same day, the general strike was suspended the Guinean Trade Union Movement.

== Subsequent developments ==
On 22 May 2025, Pendessa attend a press conference where he stated he would reject the CNRD's plan to establish a self-regulating body for the media; he also criticised its decision to revoke the licences of several private radio and television stations. Subsequently, on 3 June 2024, Pendessa's lawyer released a statement alleging that threats against Pendessa had increased since the conference, and called for the people threatening Pendessa to be located and punished.

== Recognition ==
Following Pendessa's arrest, Amnesty International called on Guinean authorities to immediately and unconditionally release Pendessa, while the Media Foundation for West Africa expressed its solidarity with Pendessa and other journalists in Guinea. After his sentencing, Reporters Without Borders described Pendessa's sentence as "a frontal assault on the free exercise of journalism and the defence of its interests".

In Guinea, a spokesperson for the SPGG stated Pendessa had been targeted by the CNRD for his "noble fight" for press freedom in Guinea. Following Pendessa's sentencing, his deputy, Ibrahima Kalil Diallo, stated that "war has been declared against the press". The directors of FIM FM, a local independent news outlet, called on journalists not to give up and to "mobilise".
