= Nabya Haidara =

Guinean political activist

Nabya Haidara was a political activist from Guinea, who was a key figure in the armed activity of the African Democratic Rally (RDA).

== Biography ==
Haidara's date of birth is unknown, but it is acknowledged that her father was originally from Rankus in modern-day Syria. and her mother Susu. Little is known about her early life, until she became prominent as one of the most daring of the RDA fighters, who were organised by Mafory Bangoura. To begin with they guarded the neighbourhood of Sandervalia in Conakry where Sékou Touré lived. They ran armed groups in the area from 1954 to 1958.

Haidara had a particularly fierce reputation as she often fought with sabres engraved with her name. When she was arrested, police found thirty sabres in her house. Aissatou N'Diaye claimed that she saw Haidara jump in the air and grab the gun of a rival party member, who was about to shoot into the crowd, in order to disarm him. The man was wounded and Haidara was sentenced to five months in prison. On one occasion she was instrumental in getting released from prison.

In her later life, Haidara went on hajj, which had a profound effect on her. She felt she had to atone for the violence in her earlier life, according to an interview in 1991 with N’Diaye.

== Challenging gender norms ==
During Haidara's lifetime, she was referred to as a "man who had been given wrong sex". There was also a rumour within the RDA that Haidara dressed as a man. Many women in the RDA challenged gender roles, and it was a key part of their success. It is also clear that during the RDA period, Haidara was seen by most people as adopting a traditionally masculine appearance and character.
