= 2008 in Guinea =

- Decades: 1980s; 1990s; 2000s; 2010s; 2020s
- See also: Other events of 2008; Timeline of Guinean history

The following lists events that happened during 2008 in Guinea.

== Events ==
=== May ===
- May 27 - Protesting soldiers seize the deputy head of the Army of Guinea a week after Lansana Kouyate is dismissed as Prime Minister.

=== December ===
- December 23 - A military coup is announced in Guinea, hours after the death of President Lansana Conté.
- December 30 - The National Council for Democracy and Development, the ruling military junta of Guinea after a recent coup, appoints Kabiné Komara as the country's new Prime Minister.
