= Sékou Kourouma =

Guinean politician (1956–2020)

Sékou Kourouma (1956 – 18 April 2020) was a Guinean politician, political aide and advisor to Guinean President Alpha Condé. He held the position of chief of staff to Condé, a high-ranking post officially known as the Secretary General of the Government, until his death from COVID-19. Kourouma, who was also a former Minister of Public Works, was a relative of Condé.

Kourouma died from complications of COVID-19 at age 65 on Saturday 18 April 2020 at Donka Hospital in Conakry. Guinea's Minister of Health, Colonel Remy Lamah, confirmed Kourouma's death that evening, while the Office of the President issued statements and tweets the next day. Kourouma's death was the latest in a string of high-profile deaths of officials during the COVID-19 pandemic in Guinea. In addition to Kourouma, the head of Guinea's electoral commission, Amadou Salif Kebe, died of COVID-19 on 17 April 2020, just 24 hours earlier. Victor Traoré, the director of Guinea's Interpol bureau, also died from COVID-19 in April.

Kourouma was also the second Chief of Staff to a West African president to die from COVID-19 in April 2020. Abba Kyari, the Chief of Staff to the President of Nigeria Muhammadu Buhari, died from COVID-19 on 17 April 2020, the day before Kourouma's death.
