= 2017 in Guinea =

- Decades: 1990s; 2000s; 2010s; 2020s
- See also: Other events of 2017; Timeline of Guinean history

Events in the year 2017 in Guinea.

== Incumbents ==
- President: Alpha Condé
- Prime Minister: Mamady Youla

== Events ==
- 21 January: Following the Gambian constitutional crisis former President Yahya Jammeh leaves The Gambia on a plane reportedly bound for Guinea.
- July: Guinea passed a law that criminalized torture and abolished the death penalty.

== Deaths ==
- 7 January: Cheick Fantamady Camara, 57, film director.
- 13 February: Momo Wandel Soumah, 39, footballer.
- 21 February: Jeanne Martin Cissé, 90, teacher and politician.
- 2 November: Somparé, 73, politician, President of the National Assembly (2002–2008).
