= Mafory Bangoura =

Guinean activist and politician (1910–1976)

Hadja Aissatou Mafory Bangoura
- Portrait of Bangoura from one syli note

Minister for Social Affairs
- Appointed by: Ahmed Sékou Touré
- Parliamentary group: Democratic Party of Guinea

Mafory Bangoura (akas: Hadja Aissatou Mafory Bangoura and Hadja Maffire Bangura; c. 1910 in Guinea – 1976 in Bucharest) was an activist for an independent Guinea, and post-independence a politician holding the post of Minister for Social Affairs in the 1970s. Known as the 'Women's President of Guinea', her portrait featured on the one syli banknote, issued in 1981.

== Early life ==
Bangoura was born circa 1910; her family were farmers and fishermen from the ethnic Soussou people. She learnt to read and write as an adult, as she had not received a western education when she was young. She moved to Conakry in 1936 to work as a seamstress. She joined the Foyer de la Basse Guinée, which was a mutual aid organisation for people from Lower Guinea. She married Badara Bangoura and they had three children.

== Political career ==
=== Activism ===
The General Strike of 1953 was intended to force the French government to abide by the Overseas Labour Code, it was led by Ahmed Sékou Touré and he invited Bangoura to mobilise women workers. At this meeting he made it clear that there was no profit, other than political and spiritual to be gained from supporting the cause. She was friends with President Touré before and after Independence. She led the presence of women at the strike committee meeting that followed, which was also the first time that women were allowed to be present, and spoke on the behalf of many women, saying they were ready to join the front line and fight for their beliefs. The strike lasted 72 days and Bangoura gave speeches as well as organising women's participation.

After the strike, Bangoura was elected to the African Democratic Rally (RDA) as president of the Women's Committee. In 1954, during an RDA rally, Bangoura encouraged women across the country to go on sex strike. The move was designed to encourage men to join the RDA. She also encouraged women to sell jewellery and clothing to financially support members of the RDA. It is said that Bangoura also designed the uniforms of the RDA and chose the white colour, which became their emblem.

During this period, Bangoura also organised a 'popular militia' made up of women, who learned to handle weapons and attack their enemies. The group was led by Bangoura and included other nationalists, including Nabya Haidara.

They patrolled the neighbourhood of Sandervalia where Sékou Touré lived. Eventually, every major neighbourhood in Conakry had its own female militia. Bangoura was head of the Conakry Red Cross who provided first aid and home-care for all those who were injured during anti-colonialist demonstrations.

=== Prison ===
Bangoura's influence on people in Guinea and the French colonial government tried to smear her reputation. They accused her of sending an anti-French document to activists who were in prison. She was fined 70,000 francs and in July 1955 sent to prison. However, hundreds of women took to the streets demonstrating against this decision and she was released after one month on 17 August.

=== In government ===
In post-independence Guinea, Bangoura held several government positions. She became a leader of the Democratic Party of Guinea (PDG) and a leading activist on women's rights in Guinea. She was elected as one of the seventeen members of the RDA-PDG's political bureau, where she represented women's issues.

In 1968, she was elected as the first president of the Union Révolutionnaires des Femmes de Guinée. In 1971, she was appointed Minister for Social Affairs. As well as representing people from Guinea on issues such as women's rights, Bangoura also shared representation of the geographical area of Conakry, Dubreka and Forecariah with colleagues - Lansana Beavogui and Saifoulaye Diallo. She was known by many as 'The President of the Women of Guinea'.

== Death ==
Bangoura died in 1976 in Bucharest. Touré wrote a short biography of her and a description of her funeral later that year.

== Honours ==
- Songs celebrating her life were recorded by the Syliphone record label, including pieces by: Emila Tompapa, Syli Orchestre de Guinee, Syli Authentic.
- In 1983 a high school was named after her: the College Hadja Mafory Bangoura.
- In 1981, Bangoura was featured on the one syli banknote.
- In 2018 she was named in a speech given by the prefect of Coyah, Dr. Ibrahima Barboza Soumah, giving thanks for 60 years of independence.
- On 2 March 2019, prayers were said for Bangoura in mosques across the country as part of Guinea's International Women's Day programme.
