= Toumba Diakité =

Guinean politician and convicted criminal (1968–2026)

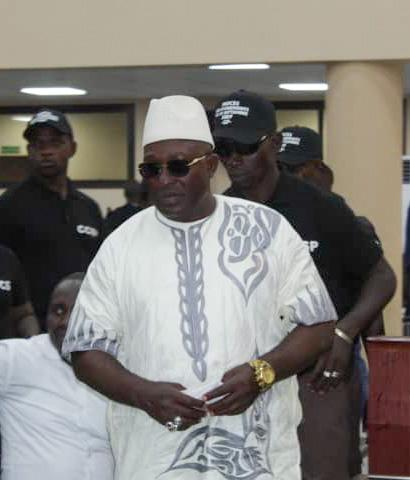
Diakité in 2022

Aboubacar Sidiki Diakité (30 April 1968 – 25 March 2026), better known as Toumba Diakité, was a Guinean politician and convicted criminal. From 2008 to 2009, Diakité was the aide-de-camp of President Moussa Dadis Camara, whom he tried to assassinate, and head of the presidential guard. From 21 September 2024, he was the president of the Democratic Party for Change (PDC), which he founded. In July 2024, he was sentenced to ten years in prison for crimes against humanity.

Diakité died on 25 March 2026, at the age of 57.
