= Conakry central prison =

Federal prison in the republic of Guinea

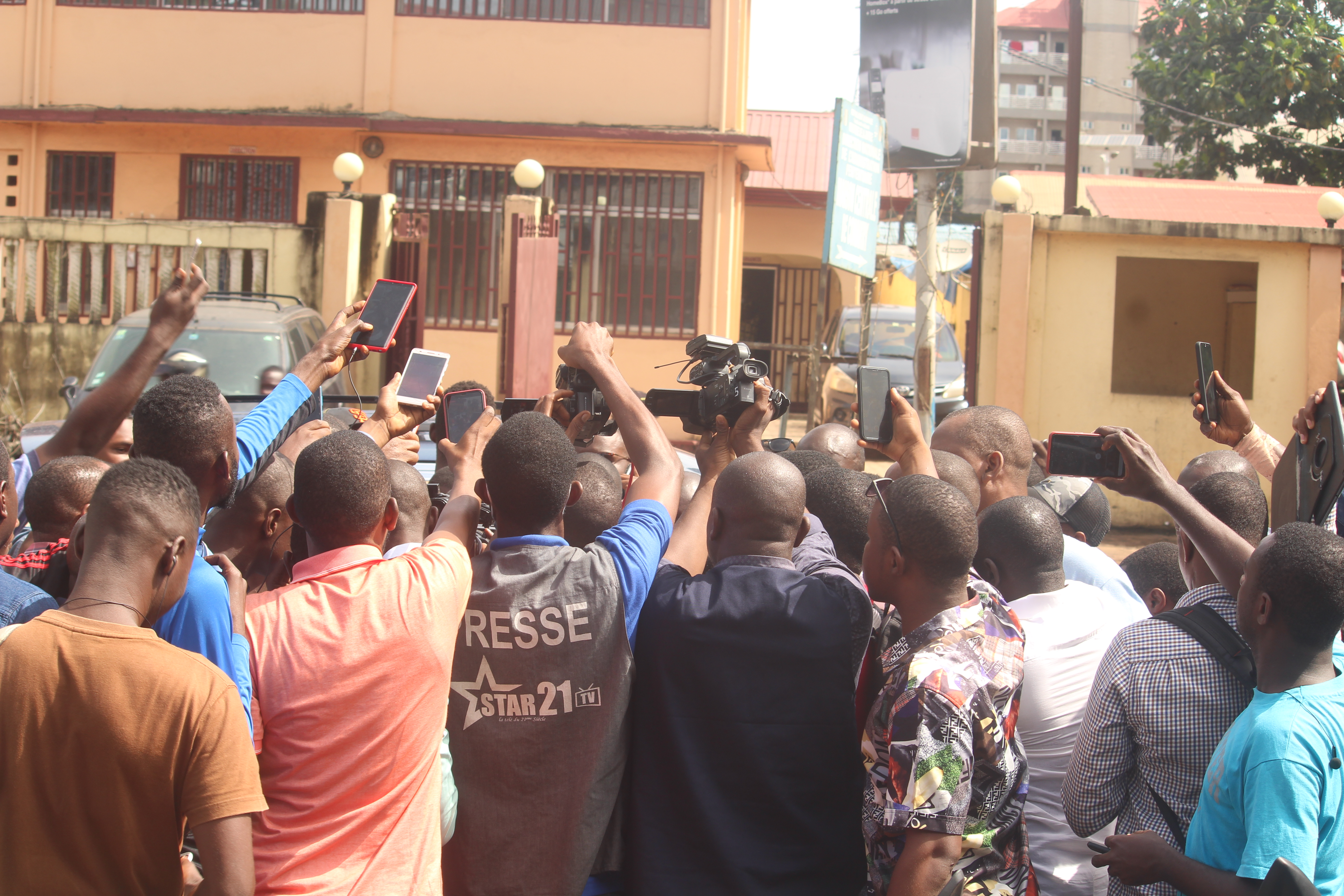
- Journalists in front of the prison upon the announcement of the liberation of political prisoners in September 2021.

- Location in Guinea
- Location: Conakry, Guinea; 9°30′49″N 13°42′19″W
- Capacity: 300
- Population: 1,140-2,000 (2014-2020,)
- Closed: 2026

Conakry central prison (French: Maison Centrale de Conakry) is a prison in Guinea located in the capital Conakry, in the commune of Kaloum.

== History ==
Built during the colonial period, the establishment has been under the jurisdiction of the Ministry of Justice of Guinea since 1984. The prison will be permanently closed and demolished in August 2026, and the prisoners will be transferred to Coyah and Forécariah.

After the 2021 Guinean coup d'état on 5 September, the National Committee of Reconciliation and Development released 79 political prisoners.

The prison was raided on 4 November 2023, resulting in the brief escape of former military ruler Moussa Dadis Camara, who was being detained for his role in the brutal suppression of the 2009 Guinean protests.

On 10 February 2026, Aboubakar Sidiki Diakite, a prisoner convicted for his role in the killings of demonstrators in the 2009 Guinean protests, was transferred to a prison in Coyah following a shooting incident at the Conakry prison. Authorities later said that he had been acting violently on that day.

Celebrations upon the announcement of the liberation of prisoners in front of the central prison

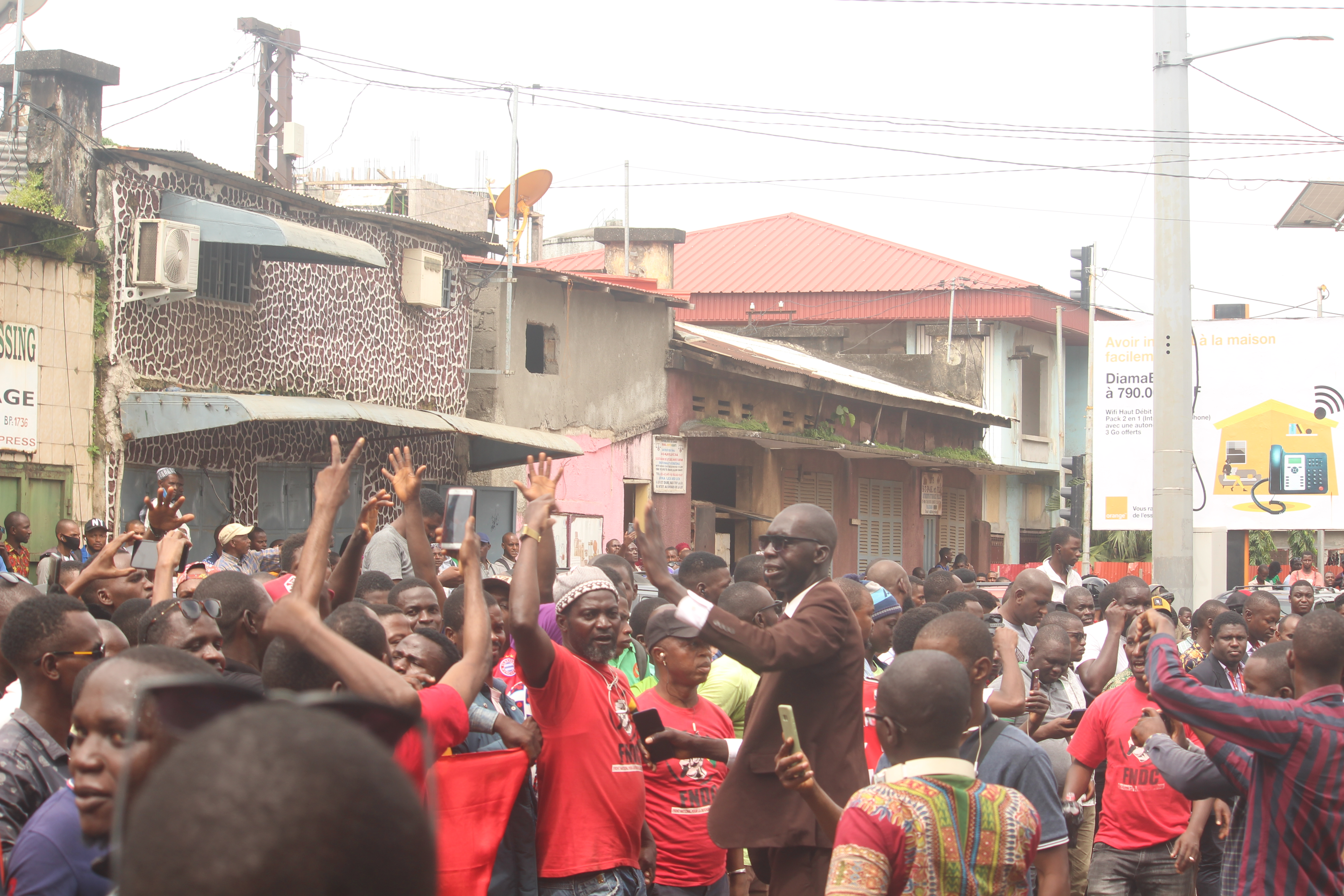

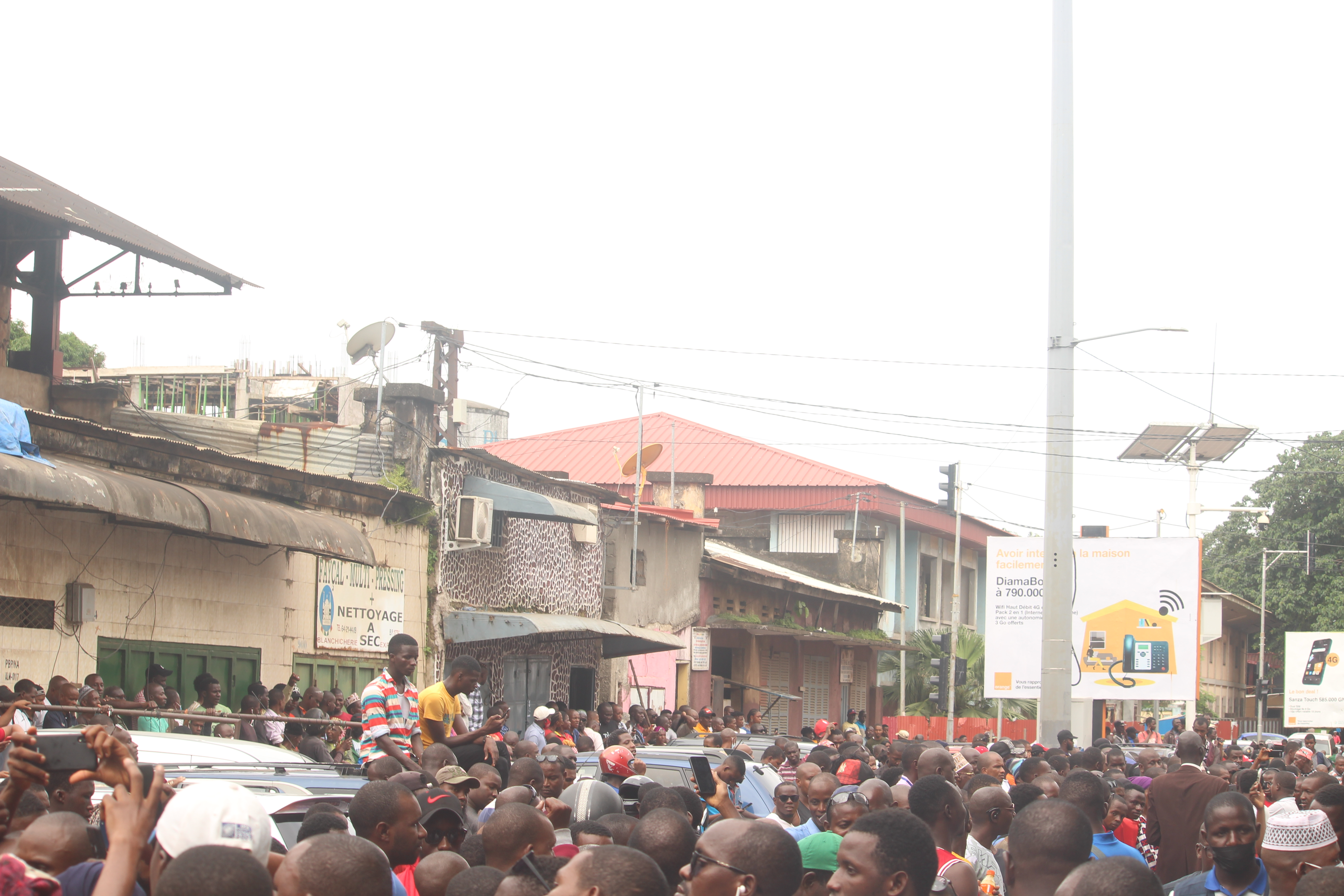

== Infrastructure ==
The Conakry central prison consists of three main buildings: one for convicts, one for defendants and the main hall.

== Conditions ==
The prison was designed to hold 300 people. However in 2021, Amnesty International reported the prison held almost 2000 detainees, while, in its 2023 report, the US Department of State described conditions as overcrowded.

== Prominent prisoners ==
Among those who have been imprisoned in the Conakry central prison include:

- Amadou Damaro Camara, former president of the National Assembly
- Ibrahima Kassory Fofana former prime minister (6 April 2022 - 2026)
- Diakaria Koulibaly former minister (6 April 2022- 2026)
