= Claude Pivi =

Guinean politician (1960–2026)

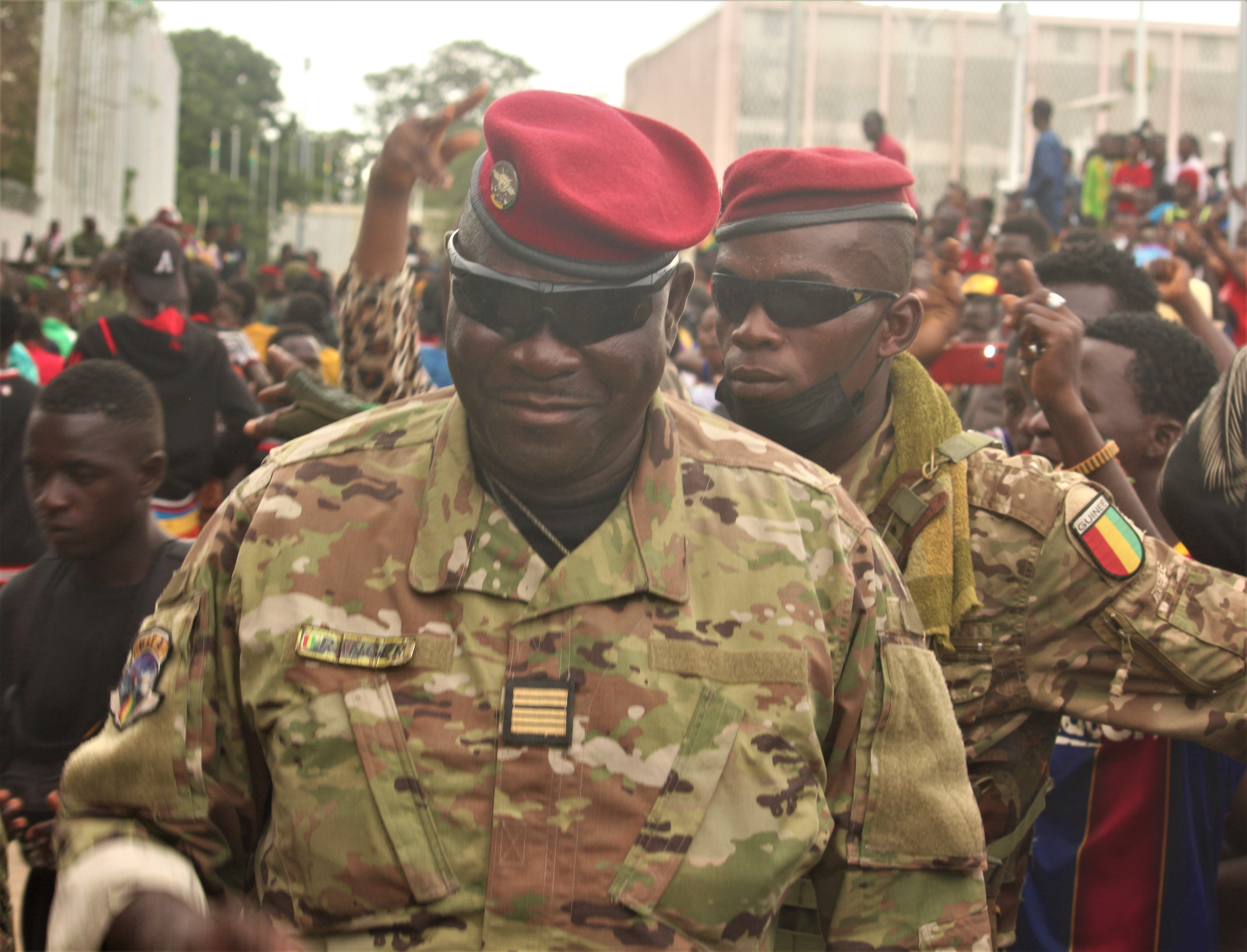

Colonel Claude Pivi (1 January 1960 – 6 January 2026) was a Guinean military and political figure who was a member of the National Council for Democracy and Development (CNDD) and a Minister from December 2008 to 2010. In 2013 he was charged in connection with the Guinea stadium massacre of 28 September 2009, in which 157 were killed by troops. The BBC describe Pivi as a "leading figure in the CNDD military junta led by Captain Moussa Dadis Camara at the time of the massacre". In November 2023, he was broken out of prison by armed commandos allegedly led by his son. The Guinean junta promised a reward of 54,000 euros for the capture of Claude Pivi.

On 17 September 2024, Pivi and his son Verny were arrested at the border with Liberia. He was extradited to Guinea on 19 September.

On 6 January 2026, Pivy died from complications of diabetes in custody at a Conakry hospital. He was 66.
