= Ousmane Conté =

Guinean politician (died 2020)

Ousmane Conté (died March 25, 2020) was the eldest son of the late Lansana Conté, President of Guinea (1984–2008). He was arrested by the Guinean military two months after his father's death as a result of the coup d'état on charges of alleged drug trafficking. In June 2010, he was named by the United States as a "drugs kingpin" and admitted on live television his trafficking involvement but said he was not a "ringleader". On July 16, 2010, he was released on bail after 16 months of imprisonment.
