= Sekou Benna Camara =

Guinean politician

Dr. Sekou Benna Camara (born May 25, 1960) is the presidential candidate and leader of U.F.A.G. (Union des Forces d'Avenir de Guinee/ Union of Forces for the Future of Guinea.) He is currently campaigning for presidency in the first democratic elections to be held in Guinea in 2010. His plans include a complete revival of infrastructure, resource management, education, and healthcare. He is an unwavering supporter of human rights and condemns violence and undemocratic governance. According to a recent poll held by rougejaunevert.com, Dr. Camara leads in popular votes among the presidential candidates.

== Biography ==
Dr. Camara was born in 1960 in a small town of Molah, Guinea to a working class family. After completing his bachelor's degree, he was chosen among the top ten students in the country to continue his studies in Europe. Dr. Camara received a Masters in Hydro-Technical Engineering from Belarusian Polytechnic Institute and went on to complete his Ph.D. in Hydro-Technical Engineering and Melioration at the Institute of Research Sciences in Minsk, Belarus.

Upon immigration to the United States in 1960, Dr. Camara earned degrees in Computer programming and Web design. He worked for the Board of Education, Morgan Stanley, Paine Webber, and the Urban Box Office.

Dr. Camara later became the managing director of AtlanTrade International, LTD managing affairs related to mining, importing, and exportation of resources.

Currently Dr. Camara is a member of AFEED (Assistance Aux Femmes Et Aux Enfants Desherites/ Assistance to Underprivileged Women and Children) in Guinea. AFEED’s aim is to provide assistance to people in need throughout the country. Dr. Camara is also a member of the Association of Guineans in the State of New York. His goal is to organize Guineans around the world and develop sustainable and applicable strategies to improve the quality of life in Guinea. For several years, Dr. Camara has been working with investment companies and entrepreneurs, creating strategies for advancement and development in Guinea He believes that sustainable development and use of resources in a judicious manner is a necessity in order to secure Guinea's growth and bright future.

Dr. Camara is married with two children. His wife is a classically trained pianist. Both his son and daughter are currently pursuing their Doctoral degrees in Physiotherapy and Traditional Chinese Medicine, respectively.

Quotations

Camara L. "La democratie et l'unite decront voir le jour ici et maintenant", dixit Dr. Sekou Benna Camara. Horoya. January 29, 2010
