= 2014 in Guinea =

- Decades: 1990s; 2000s; 2010s; 2020s
- See also: Other events of 2014; Timeline of Guinean history

The following lists events that happened during 2014 in Guinea.

== Incumbents ==
- President: Alpha Condé
- Prime Minister: Mohamed Said Fofana

== Events ==
=== March ===
- March 18 - Guinean health officials announced the Ebola outbreak of a mysterious hemorrhagic fever "which strikes like lightning." 35 cases are reported, and at least 23 people died.
- March 23 - The United Nations Children's Fund reports that an outbreak of the deadly Ebola virus that has so far claimed the lives of 59 victims has spread from southern Guinea to the capital Conakry.
- March 24 - An outbreak of Ebola virus which has killed at least 59 people in Guinea continues its spread, entering Liberia and threatens to spread to Sierra Leone.

=== April ===
- April 1 - The death toll in Guinea rises to 80 with two people dead in neighbouring Liberia.
- April 4 - The first possible case is reported in Mali, with the death toll rising in Guinea and Liberia to 90.
- April 15 - The death toll from the West Africa Ebola outbreak reaches 121.

=== June ===
- June 6 - The World Health Organization estimates that an outbreak of the Ebola virus has killed more than 200 people in West Africa.

=== July ===
- July 14 - The Ebola virus outbreak in West Africa continues to get worse with the death toll now exceeding 500.
- July 31 - The World Health Organization announces a US$100 million emergency response plan to combat the outbreak, which has killed at least 729 people.

=== November ===
- November 13 - The World Health Organization reports that the death toll in the three worst affected countries in West Africa - Guinea, Liberia and Sierra Leone - has passed 5,000.
