= Mohamed Said Fofana =

Guinean politician

12th Prime Minister of Guinea
- In office 24 December 2010 – 29 December 2015
- President: Alpha Condé
- Preceded by: Jean-Marie Doré
- Succeeded by: Mamady Youla

Personal details
- Born: 1952 (age 73–74)
- Party: Independent

Mohamed Saïd Fofana (born 1952) was the Prime Minister of Guinea from 2010 to 2015. He was appointed by President Alpha Condé on December 24, 2010. His previous role was director of economic research at the commerce ministry.

Fofana and his government resigned on January 16, 2014. However, he was re-appointed as Prime Minister three days later.

After Condé won a second term in the October 2015 presidential election, Fofana resigned as Prime Minister on 23 December 2015, and Condé appointed Mamady Youla to replace him on 26 December.

Political offices
Preceded by Jean-Marie Doré	Prime Minister of Guinea; 2010–2015	Succeeded by Mamady Youla
