= 2020 Guinean parliamentary election =

- 22 March 2020

All 114 seats in the National Assembly 58 seats needed for a majority
- Registered: 5,179,600
- Turnout: 58.04% (▼6.33pp)

Parliamentary elections were held in Guinea on 22 March 2020 alongside a constitutional referendum, after being postponed four times from the original date of January 2019.

== Electoral system ==
The 114 members of the National Assembly are elected by a mixed member system; 38 are elected from single-member constituencies based on the 33 prefectures and five communes of Conakry by first-past-the-post voting, whilst the other 76 are elected from a single nationwide constituency by proportional representation.

== Results ==
The elections were boycotted by the main opposition parties. As a result, President Condé's party won a supermajority of seats.

Party	Proportional			Constituency			Total seats	+/–
Party	Votes	%	Seats	Votes	%	Seats	Total seats	+/–
Rally of the Guinean People–Rainbow	1,591,650	55.27	42	2,417,836	89.05	37	79	+26
Guinean Democratic Union	151,576	5.26	4	56,085	2.07	0	4	New
Guinean Popular Democratic Movement	113,702	3.95	3	74,343	2.74	0	3	New
New Democratic Forces	76,612	2.66	2	4,711	0.17	1	3	New
Union for Progress and Renewal	76,512	2.66	2	14,597	0.54	0	2	1
Rally for the Integrated Development of Guinea	76,412	2.65	2	23,901	0.88	0	2	1
Union of the Forces of Change	76,208	2.65	2				2	New
Democratic Alternation for Reform–Constructive Opposition Bloc	76,188	2.65	2				2	New
Guinea for Democracy and Balance	76,012	2.64	2	31,671	1.17	0	2	New
Guinean Party for Renaissance and Progress	39,706	1.38	1				1	0
Afia Party	39,126	1.36	1				1	+1
Civic Generation	39,106	1.36	1				1	+1
Forces of Integrity for Development	39,106	1.36	1				1	New
Guinean Party for Progress and Development	38,430	1.33	1				1	+1
Rally for Renaissance and Development	38,310	1.33	1	10,608	0.39	0	1	New
Party for Peace and Development	38,176	1.33	1				1	New
Alliance for National Renewal	37,906	1.32	1				1	New
Union of Democratic Forces	37,900	1.32	1	13,923	0.51	0	1	+1
Movement of Patriots for Development	29,996	1.04	1				1	New
Alliance for National Renewal	29,800	1.03	1				1	New
New Generation for the Republic	29,800	1.03	1	12,917	0.48	0	1	0
Guinea United for Development	29,140	1.01	1				1	0
PDG–RDA	27,640	0.96	1				1	+1
Rally for a Prosperous Guinea	27,400	0.95	1				1	+1
Democratic Party of Conservatives	12,324	0.43	0	16,441	0.61	0	0	New
Guinean Party of the Renaissance	10,204	0.35	0				0	New
Union for the Defence of Republican Interests	7,536	0.26	0	24,046	0.89	0	0	New
Guinean Rally for Unity and Development	5,494	0.19	0				0	0
Rally for the Republic	5,422	0.19	0				0	New
Pan-African Party of Guinea	2,550	0.09	0				0	New
Party New Vision				8,038	0.30	0	0	–
Alliance of Forces for Change				4,698	0.17	0	0	–
Party of the National Defense for Development				1,333	0.05	0	0	–
Total	2,879,944	100.00	76	2,715,148	100.00	38	114	0
Valid votes	2,879,944	95.80		2,715,148	91.48			
Invalid/blank votes	126,111	4.20		252,939	8.52			
Total votes	3,006,055	100.00		2,968,087	100.00			
Registered voters/turnout	5,179,600	58.04		5,179,600	57.30			
Source: CENI, CC
