= Guinean franc =

Currency of Guinea

franc guinéen (French)
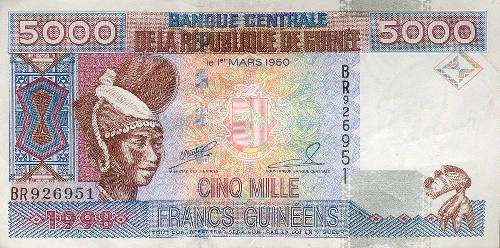
5000 franc of the old series
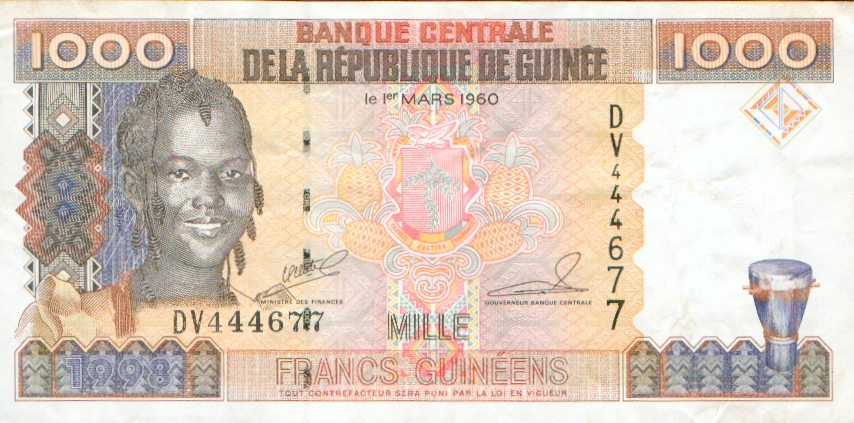
1000 franc of the old series

ISO 4217
- Code: GNF (numeric: 324)

Units of account
- Symbol: FG (possibly also Fr or GFr)
- Subunit
- 1/100: centime (never used)

Denominations
- Banknotes
- Freq. used: 100, 500, 1,000, 2,000, 5,000, 10,000, 20,000 francs
- Rarely used: 25, 50 francs
- Coins: 1, 5, 10, 25, 50 francs

Demographics
- User(s): Guinea

Issuance
- Central bank: Central Bank of the Republic of Guinea
- Website: www.bcrg-guinee.org

Valuation
- Inflation: 7.9%
- Source: The World Factbook, 2016 est.

The Guinean franc (French: franc guinéen, ISO 4217 code: GNF) is the currency of Guinea. It is subdivided into one hundred centimes, but no centime denominations were ever issued.

== History ==
=== First Guinean franc ===
The first Guinean franc, officially simply "franc", was introduced on 1 March 1960 to replace the CFA franc. There were 1, 5, 10 and 25 francs coins (made of aluminium bronze) with banknotes (dated 1958) in 50, 100, 500, 1000, 5000 and 10,000 francs denominations. A second series of banknotes dated 1er MARS 1960 was issued on 1 March 1963, without the 10,000 francs. This series was printed without imprint by Thomas De La Rue, and includes more colors, enhanced embossing, and improved security features. A new issue of coins in 1962 was made of cupronickel.

In 1971, the franc was replaced by syli at a rate of 1 syli = 10 francs. 20 percent was used by francs

=== Second Guinean franc ===
The Guinean franc was reintroduced as Guinea's currency in 1985 under the name "franc guinéen", at par with the syli. The coins came in denominations of 1, 5 and 10 francs made of brass clad steel, with brass 25 francs (1987) and cupronickel 50 francs (1994) added later. Banknotes were first issued in denominations of 25, 50, 100, 500, 1000 and 5000 francs. Guinean notes of this series are unique from those of other countries in that the date of issue features very prominently as part of the overall design on the lower left hand corner of each note.

A second series issued in 1998 dropped the 25 and 50 francs banknotes, since they had been replaced by coins. In 2006, the third issue were introduced in denomination of 500, 1000 and 5000 francs that are similar to previous issues, but the most notable change was the use of full printing of the notes and enhanced security features on each of the notes. Another change for this issue was the size of the 500 francs was reduced. On 11 June 2007, a 10,000 franc was issued.

In 2010, a commemorative series of 1000, 5000, and 10,000 francs banknotes celebrating the fiftieth anniversary of both the Guinean franc and the Banque Centrale de la République de Guinée (BCRG) was issued featuring a diamond-shaped logo of the event on the front side of each denomination inside of the watermark window to the right.

On July 9, 2012, the Central Bank of the Republic of Guinea issued a new 10,000 francs banknote which is similar to the original issue, but it has been revised. The banknote's main color was changed from green to red, and instead of a diamond-shaped patch placed on the letters "RG" (for Republique de Guinée), it is now replaced by a holographic patch and the holographic security strip now showing on the reverse side. On May 11, 2015, the Central Bank of the Republic of Guinea issued a 20,000 franc banknote. On January 21, 2018, the Central Bank of the Republic of Guinea issued a revised banknote of 20,000 francs, with a reduced size and advanced security features. On March 1, 2019, on the 59th anniversary of the introduction of its national currency, the Central Bank of the Republic of Guinea issued a revised banknote for 10,000 francs and issued a new banknote for 2,000 francs.

Currently, the smallest denomination in circulation is the 500 francs note due to diminished purchasing power.

Banknotes of the Guinean franc (current issues)
Image		Value	Dimensions	Main color	Description			Date of issue	Year of issue
Obverse	Reverse	Value	Dimensions	Main color	Obverse	Reverse	Watermark	Date of issue	Year of issue
		100 Francs Guinéens		Purple, light-brown, pink and green	Woman; Coat of arms of Guinea	Banana harvest			1998
		500 Francs Guinéens	128 × 64 mm	Green, dark-olive and light-brown	Woman with headscarf; Coat of arms of Guinea	Mining conveyor; headdress	Woman with headscarf; letters "RF"		2018
		1,000 Francs Guinéens	132 × 64 mm	Brown, purple, red, light-blue and yellow	Woman; Coat of arms of Guinea	Open pit bauxite mining, stalk of bananas			2015
		2,000 Francs Guinéens	136 × 67 mm	Green and pale blue	Man; Coat of arms of Guinea	Mount Nimba			2018
		5,000 Francs Guinéens	141 × 67 mm	Purple	Woman; corn; Coat of arms of Guinea	Kinkon hydroelectric plant			2015
		10,000 Francs Guinéens	144 × 70 mm	Red	Boy; Coat of arms of Guinea	Field, Mount Loura with rock formation "Lady of Mali"			2015
		20,000 Francs Guinéens	149 × 70 mm	Blue	Woman; Coat of arms of Guinea	Kaleta hydroelectric dam			2018

=== Exchange rate ===
As of 23 October 2018, 1 Euro is equal to 10,417.46 Guinean Francs, which means that the highest valued banknote, of 20,000 Francs, has a value of less than 2 Euros.

Current GNF exchange rates
From Google Finance:	AUD CAD CHF CNY EUR GBP HKD JPY USD
From Yahoo! Finance:	AUD CAD CHF CNY EUR GBP HKD JPY USD
From XE.com:	AUD CAD CHF CNY EUR GBP HKD JPY USD
From OANDA:	AUD CAD CHF CNY EUR GBP HKD JPY USD

== See also ==
- Economy of Guinea

Historical:

- CFA franc
- Guinean syli
