= Ibrahima Kassory Fofana =

Prime Minister of Guinea (2018–2021)

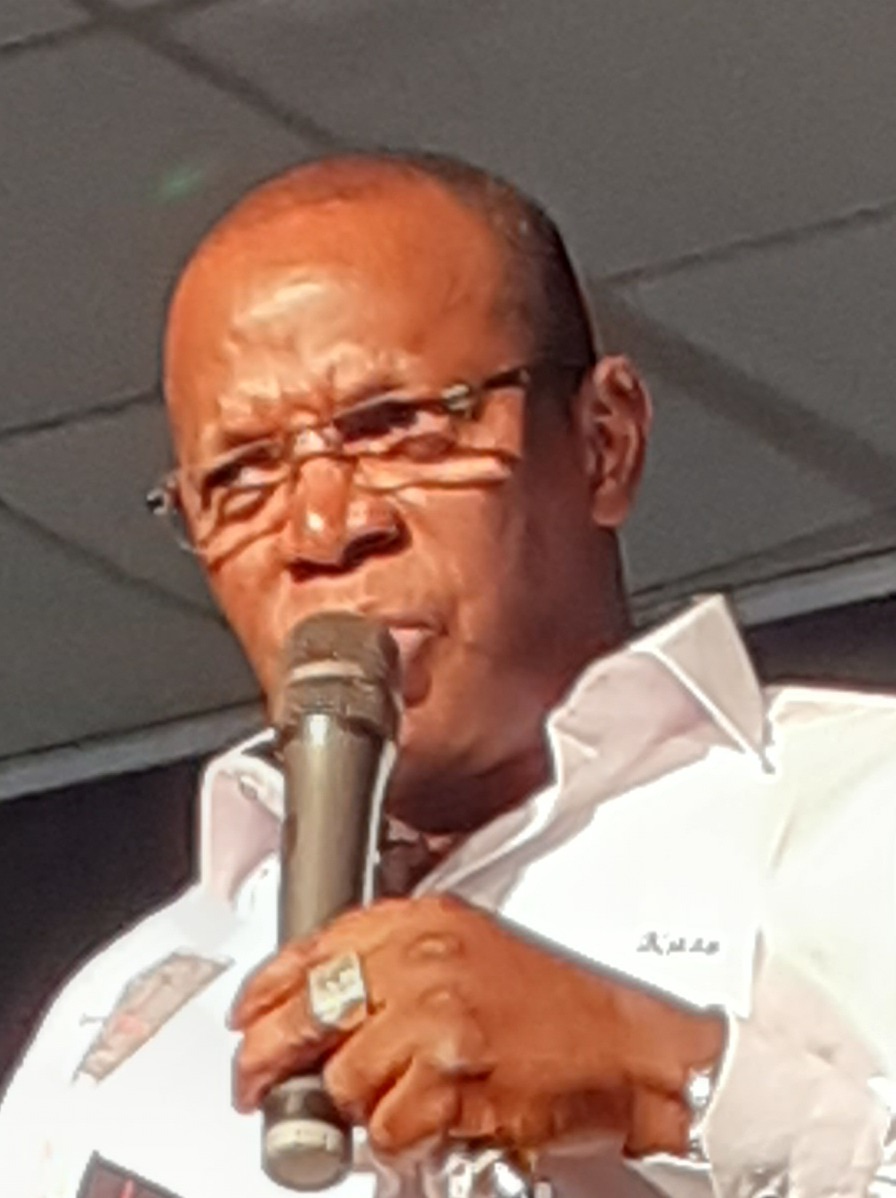

Prime Minister of Guinea
- In office 21 May 2018 – 5 September 2021
- President: Alpha Condé
- Preceded by: Mamady Youla
- Succeeded by: Mohamed Béavogui

State minister in charge of investments and public-private partnerships
- In office 2014–2018

Minister of Economy and Finance
- In office 1998–2000
- Preceded by: Ousmane Kaba
- Succeeded by: Cheick Amadou Camara

Personal details
- Born: 15 April 1954 (age 72) Forécariah, French Guinea, French West Africa
- Party: RPG
- Education: Gamal Abdel Nasser University of Conakry

Ibrahima Kassory Fofana (born 15 April 1954) is a Guinean politician who served as Prime Minister of Guinea between 21 May 2018 and 5 September 2021.

A macro-economist and specialist in economic policy, he previously held several strategic positions in the Guinean administration, including State minister for investments and public-private partnerships under the presidency of Alpha Condé and Minister of Economy and Finance under the presidency of Lansana Conté, and was candidate for the 2010 presidential elections.

== Biography ==
Ibrahima Kassory Fofana was born in Forécariah (Lower Guinea) into a peasant family descended from Muslim imams.

=== Early life ===
A graduate with honours of the Gamal Abdel Nasser University of Conakry, in 1978 he joined the research department of the ministry of international cooperation as deputy director. Later, he rose in the ministry of planning and cooperation to become director of international cooperation (1986) and director of public Investments (1991).

=== Ministerial rise ===
He then enjoyed a meteoric rise in the first circle of the Guinean president Lansana Conté, over whom he enjoyed great influence. In 1994 as minister without portfolio, he was general administrator in charge of major national projects and oversaw the restructuring of state-owned companies and the economic reforms necessary to shift the Guinean economy from a socialist to a liberal model. He became in 1996 minister for the budget and the restructuring of the parapublic sector.

He was promoted in 1998 to become Minister of Economy and Finance, a key position he held until 2000. He was able to successfully carry out a structural adjustment program with the IMF and the World Bank. He also initiated the first anti-corruption program in Guinea, which led to arrests and court cases against the executives concerned, and a program to clean up the civil service list which resulted in savings of billions of Guinean francs for the public treasury.

During this time he was also Guinea's governor at the African Development Bank (1996-2000) and Guinea's administrator at the International Monetary Fund (1998-2000). He was also member of the Board of many Guinean private and public companies.

=== Exile and entry into politics ===
In 2000 he left government for reasons said to include conflict with the army over its expenses, and manipulation orchestrated against him by the entourage of President Lansana Conté. He decided to go abroad, first to Senegal and then to the United States.

In 2002 in the United States, he obtained a postgraduate doctorate in development, finance and banking from the American University in Washington and became international consultant.

In 2009, under the military transition after the death of President Lansana Conté, he returned to Conakry and created the Guinea for All party (GPT), which was notable in the Guinean political landscape for its categorical rejection of ethnic favoritism. One of the 24 candidates in the first Guinean democratic presidential election of 2010, he presented a program focused on improving governance, decentralization and regional integration, ranking 11th in the first round with 0.66% of the vote. In the second round, he chose to vote in favor of Alpha Condé, who won the ballot with 52.52% of the votes.

He later split with his former ally amid disagreements over the disputed organization of the country's first democratic parliamentary elections. He fought alongside the opposition for holding transparent elections and took part in street demonstrations.

=== President Alpha Condé’s ally ===
In the aftermath of the September 2013 legislative elections, where GPT obtained one seat out of 114, he re-established friendly relations with Alpha Condé who had asked for his help with the country's economic recovery. He decided to make a useful alliance by joining the presidential camp.

In 2014, he became State Minister in charge of investments and public-private partnerships at the Administration of President Alpha Condé. In this strategic - and newly created - post, he coordinated efforts at home and abroad to mobilize the resources necessary for prioritizing investments. He was behind the diversification of partnerships towards emerging countries, such as China, from which he obtained $20 billion in investments.

He was campaign director for President Alpha Condé in the October 2015 Guinean presidential election, for which his GPT party did not present a candidate.

In May 2018, he dissolved GPT and joined the RPG-Arc-en-Ciel, the ruling coalition.

=== Prime minister ===
On 21 May 2018 Ibrahima Kassory Fofana was appointed by President Alpha Condé Prime Minister of Guinea. He announced an ambitious poverty reduction program aimed at lifting 40% of Guineans, which represents six million people, out of extreme poverty by 2025.

=== 2021 Guinea coup ===
On 5 September 2021, the entire Guinean government was dissolved following Condé's arrest and overthrow in the 2021 Guinean coup.

=== Arrest ===
Prosecuted for Alleged acts of illicit enrichment and embezzlement of public funds, a warrant of committal was signed for Ibrahima Kassory Fofana's arrest, and he was detained at the Maison Centrale de Conakry prison on 6 April 2022 after three days of interrogation by the Court of repression of economic and financial offences (CRIEF).

On 19 May 2022, he was set to be freed with a fine of twenty billion Guinean Francs and placed under judicial control, but the Prosecutor of the CRIEF opposed his release.

In November 2022, Fofana, still in detention, was prosecuted along with about 180 members of the regime of Alpha Condé, for "corruption, illicit enrichment and embezzlement, fraud and usage of fraud in public writing, embezzlement of public funds and complicity".

On December 11, 2024, CRIEF decided to transfer him to a specialized center for better medical care.

On February 27, 2025, Fofana was sentenced to five years in prison by CRIEF after being convicted of illicit enrichment, embezzlement of public funds and money laundering. He was also ordered to pay a fine of two billion Guinean francs ($230,000).
