= 2009 Guinean protests =

Opposition rallies

The 2009 Guinean protests were an opposition rally in Conakry, Guinea on 28 September 2009, with about 50,000 participants demonstrating against the junta government that came to power after the 2008 Guinean coup d'état in December. The protest march was fueled by the indication of junta leader Captain Moussa Dadis Camara that he would break his pledge to not run in the next presidential vote, due in January 2010. The government had already banned any form of protests until 2 October. When the demonstrators gathered in a large stadium, the security forces opened fire on them. At least 157 demonstrators were killed, 1,253 were injured, and 30—including Cellou Dalein Diallo, the leader of the opposition Union of Democratic Forces of Guinea (UDFG)—were arrested and taken away in lorries.

On the same day in 2018, six human rights organizations demanded justice for the perpetrators. The organizations were the Association of Victims, Parents and Friends of the 28 September Massacre (AVIPA), the Guinean Human Rights Organization (OGDH), the International Federation for Human Rights (FIDH), Amnesty International, and Human Rights Watch.

Sidya Touré, former Prime Minister and now an opposition leader, was also injured in the shootings and spoke to the BBC secretly from a hospital restroom. Opponents have accused the junta of limiting freedom of speech and violating human rights. Camara said that the troops responsible for the shooting spree were out of his control.

On July 31, 2024, Moussa Dadis Camara was found guilty of "crimes against humanity" in connection with the 2009 massacres, and was sentenced to twenty years in prison. He was pardoned the following year by President Mamady Doumbouya.

On 26 March 2026, Aboubacar Sidiki Diakité, the former Guinean army commander convicted in July 2024 for his role in orchestrating the stadium massacre which occurred during the protests, died in prison.

== Background ==
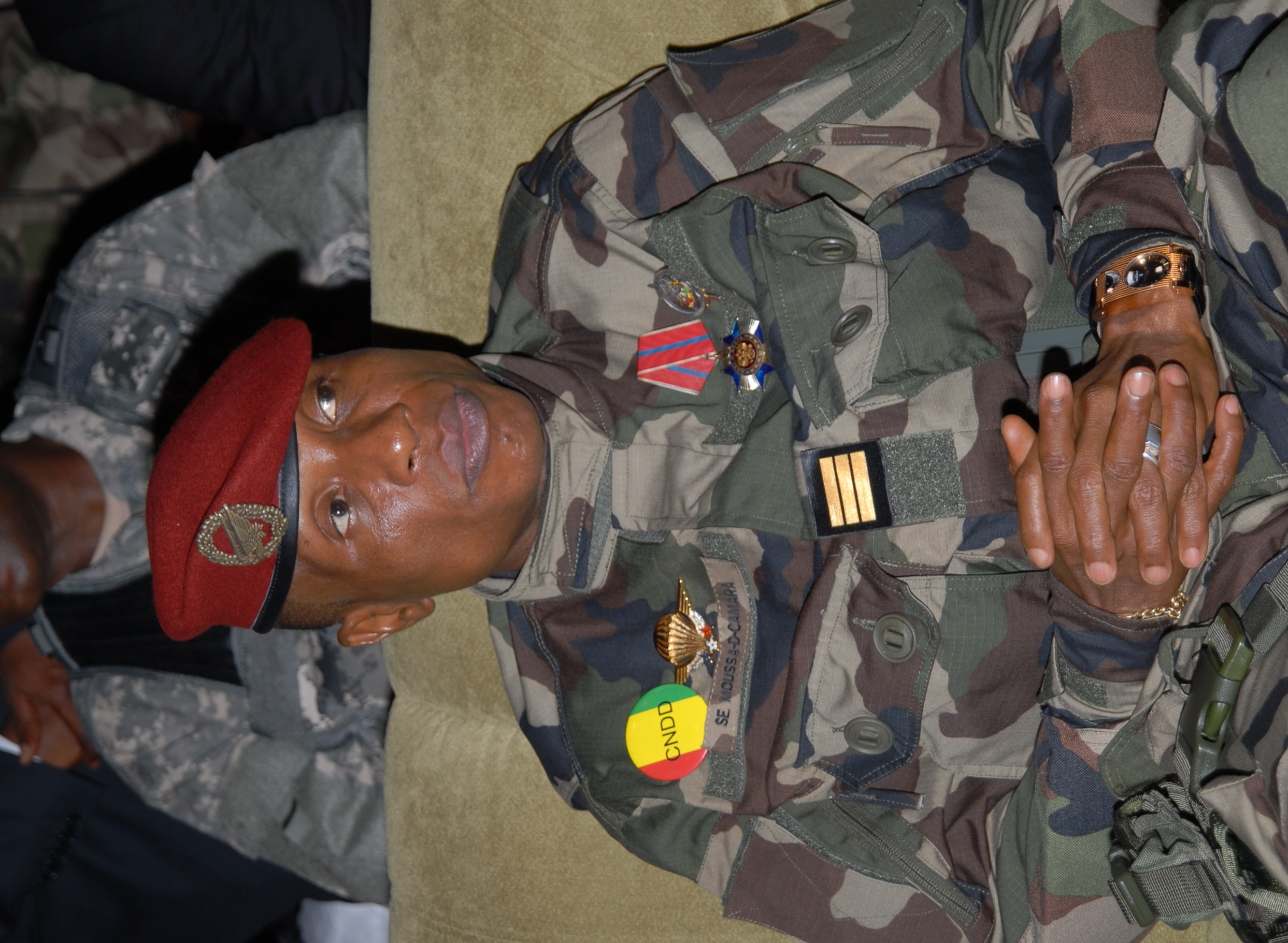
Capt. Moussa Dadis Camara, leader of the junta.

On 24 December 2008, about six hours after the death of Lansana Conté, a statement was read on state radio announcing a military coup d'état by Captain Moussa Dadis Camara on behalf of a group called the National Council for Democracy and Development (CNDD), which said that "the government and the institutions of the Republic have been dissolved." The statement also announced the suspension of the constitution "as well as political and union activity." According to Captain Camara, the coup was necessary because of Guinea's "deep despair" amidst rampant poverty and corruption, and he said that the existing institutions were "incapable of resolving the crises which have been confronting the country." Furthermore, Camara said that someone from the military would become president, while a civilian would be appointed as Prime Minister at the head of a new government that would be ethnically balanced.

Initially, when Camara took over power, there was some support, the public being tired of Lansana Conté's 24-year-long authoritarian rule. Camara promised a smooth country transition to democracy and a presidential election in which he would not stand. He gained much popularity by cracking down on drug dealers, including Ousmane Conté, son of the former president, and by making them admit wrongdoing on his television show. Later, Camara lost support because of his dictatorship-like rule and abusive behavior by him and his forces that indulged in violence, robberies and rapes. He himself humiliated several foreign ambassadors, politicians and leaders by telling them to "shut up or leave" from meetings. This hurt his public image and garnered criticism for his erratic behavior.

== Protest ==
The opponents had decided to stage a demonstration on 28 September against the likely participation of Camara in the next presidential election. Despite the government's protest ban, they continued their scheduled protest. A crowd of around 50,000 people gathered at the Stade du 28 Septembre on the day, carrying signs that read "Down with the army in power" and calling for an end of the "Dadis show".

According to eyewitness accounts, the elite Presidential Guard, commonly known as the "Red Berets", came in trucks and threw tear gas on the crowd at first but later opened fire. In the atmosphere of terror and panic, people started running, falling, and getting hit. Youssouf Koumbassa, an eyewitness, claimed that the troops stripped down some female protesters. The equipment of a French journalist was seized and smashed. Protesters fled the stadium and poured into the streets, where they were pursued and fired on by troops.

After the shooting incident, soldiers were seen publicly raping women, killing people, and looting stores. According to one eyewitness, soldiers asked people if they supported Camara, and those who did not were summarily executed, that some women were raped with guns, and shot dead, and that civilians were beaten and old men yanked by their beards.

The wounded were taken to hospital, where they were visited by human rights activists. Although many had gunshot wounds, some were found to have been severely beaten. The dead were taken to a mortuary, and soldiers stood guard outside. Relatives were called in to collect the dead. According to many victims' families, the military secretly disposed of over 100 bodies, as many had found that the bodies of their relatives had disappeared. Many witnesses reported seeing presidential guards loading some of the bodies into trucks. Images showing dozens of bodies lined up on the street were uncovered, and human rights groups used them as evidence to show that the death toll was much higher than government figures.

In the aftermath of the protests, hundreds of protesters who had taken part were arrested and imprisoned without charge.

== Government reaction ==
Camara, in an interview to Radio France Internationale (RFI) said that the troops responsible for the killings were "uncontrollable elements in the military" and "Even I, as head of state in this very tense situation, cannot claim to be able to control those elements in the military". He also denied any responsibility for the killings, claiming that he did not issue any shooting orders, and was in his office. Camara has also denied knowledge of sexual assaults by soldiers. He later called for a UN investigation into the incident, an African mediator between the various Guinean political parties and a national unity government. The Economic Community of West African States (ECOWAS) dispatched President Blaise Compaoré of Burkina Faso to act as a mediator. The proposal for national unity government was rejected by the opposition, calling it a tactic to divert attention from the massacre.

On 7 October, Camara announced a 31-member commission, including 7 judges from the Justice Ministry, to investigate the details behind the incident. Camara claimed that it would be an independent inquiry.

The long-awaited trial for the killings in the stadium began on September 28, 2022, by which time Camara had left office. On 4 November 2023, a heavily armed group broke Camara and three other officials out of the Conakry jail during clashes that left nine people dead. He was recaptured hours later. On July 31, 2024, Camara was convicted for the killings and was sentenced to 20 years' imprisonment. On March 28, 2025 Camara was granted a humanitarian pardon by President Mamady Doumbouya.

== Death toll controversy ==
Three days after the incident, the junta stuck to asserting a death toll of 56, while they were accused of secretly burying several bodies in the Alpha Yaya Diallo military camp. Both, Guinean Organisation for the Defence of Human Rights (OGDH) and African Assembly for the Defence of Human Rights (RADDHO) confirmed that it had received requests from families to look into the alleged clandestine burials performed by the military. The cold rooms at a hospital were opened for journalists on 1 October. Hassan Bah, the forensic expert who allowed the media into the morgues denied the occurrence of any secret burials by soldiers.

== International reactions ==
The firing by security forces received international criticism.

Chile – The Ministry for Foreign Affairs of Chile issued a statement, that "facing a wholesale slaughter of people for political reasons, atrocities and extreme violence, Chile demands from the authorities of Guinea immediate action leading to prosecution of perpetrators, the release of opposition leaders, the restoration of order and respect for civil and political rights so as to ensure a peaceful transition to democracy soon".

France – France, in its statement initially condemned the violent nature of the protests by the opposition demonstrators, but later suspended its military ties with Guinea and called for a European Union (EU) meeting.

United States – The United States urged the junta government to "stand by its promise to hold free, fair, timely and transparent elections in which no member of the ruling junta will participate".

The African Union was concerned about the "deteriorating situation" in the country, and indicated their intent to impose sanctions against Guinea if Camara ran in the next presidential elections.

European Union – Javier Solana, the foreign policy chief of EU, called for the immediate release of arrested pro-democracy leaders and urged the government to "exercise maximum restraint and ensure a peaceful and democratic transition". On 21 October, the EU Council announced an arms embargo and sanctions against individuals in the junta.

Liberia- The president of Liberia, Ellen Johnson Sirleaf, has called for an ECOWAS summit on this matter.

On account of aggravation of political tension in Guinea due to this incident, FIFA decided to change the venue of the 2010 World Cup qualifier between Guinea and Burkina Faso, citing safety concerns. The game was played in Accra, Ghana instead of Conakry.

== International inquiries ==
Human Rights Watch (HRW) issued a report in December 2009 implicating several CNDD leaders in the massacre, and indicating that the events may constitute crimes against humanity.

The United Nations released a 60-page report in 2009, describing the violence carried against protestors especially women. According to the U.N panel, 109 women and girls had been raped or sexually mutilated. The U.N Commission reached the same conclusion of the HRW by stating that it is " reasonable to conclude" that violence observed during the attack constitutes crimes against humanity. The report was also sent to the security council, The African Union, Guinea's government and ECOWAS.

== See also ==
- Assassination attempt of Moussa Dadis Camara
