= Mamady Youla =

Guinean politician and economist

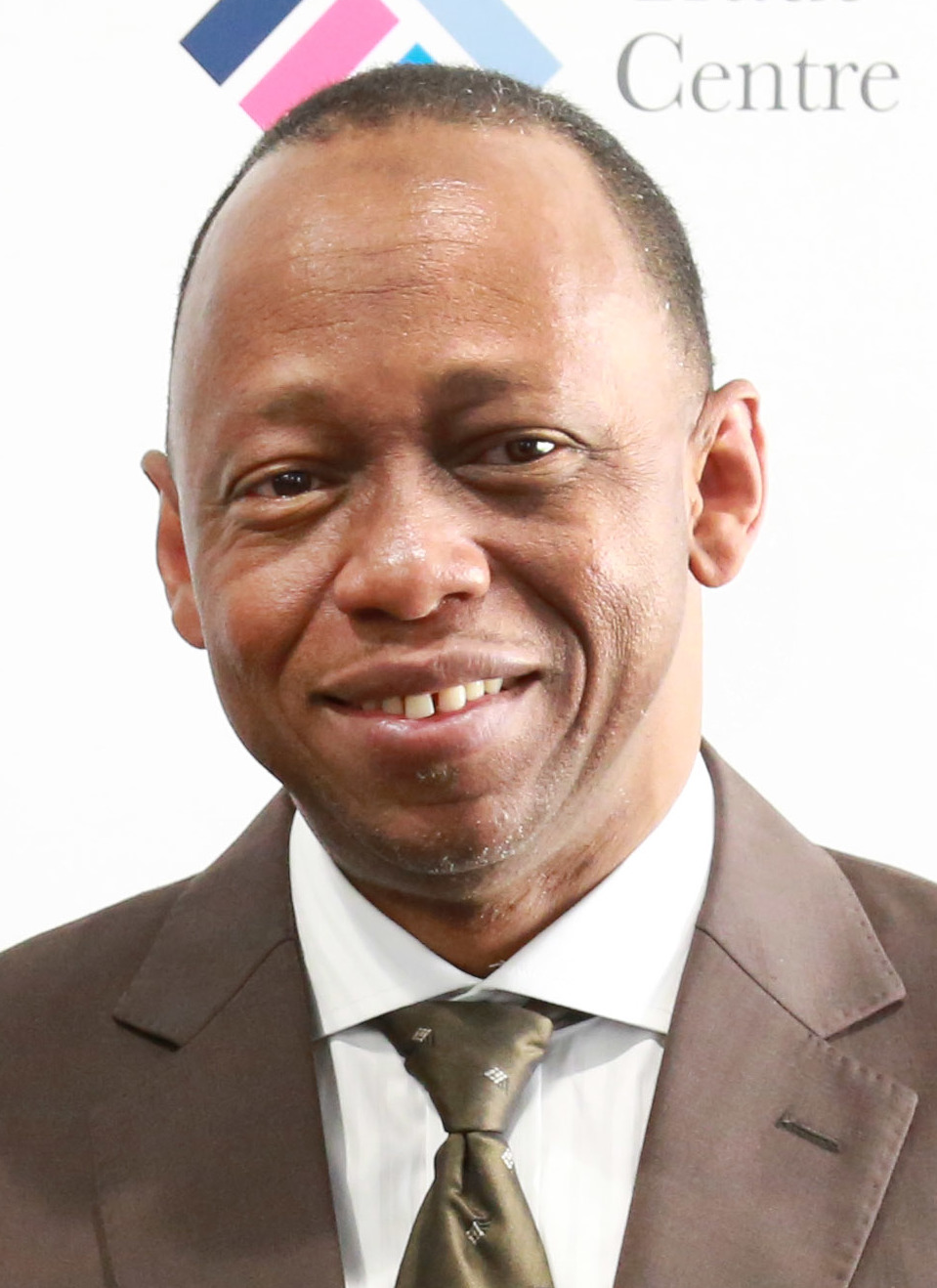

Prime Minister of Guinea
- In office 29 December 2015 – 24 May 2018
- President: Alpha Condé
- Preceded by: Mohamed Said Fofana
- Succeeded by: Ibrahima Kassory Fofana

Personal details
- Born: 5 November 1961 (age 64) Conakry, Guinea
- Party: Independent
- Education: Félix Houphouët-Boigny; University

Mamady Youla (born 1961) is a Guinean businessman and politician who was the Prime Minister of Guinea from 2015 to 2018.

Youla was managing director of Guinea Alumina Corporation, a mining company and subsidiary of a company based in the United Arab Emirates, from 2004 to 2015. After President Alpha Condé won a second term in the October 2015 presidential election, he appointed Youla as Prime Minister on 26 December 2015. He took office on 29 December 2015. The government touted Youla's business experience, saying that Youla's appointment reflected Condé's focus on promoting employment and boosting the private sector.

Political offices
Preceded by Mohamed Said Fofana	Prime Minister of Guinea; 2015–2018	Succeeded by Ibrahima Kassory Fofana
