= COVID-19 pandemic in Guinea =

- Disease: COVID-19
- Pathogen: SARS-CoV-2
- Location: Guinea
- First outbreak: Wuhan, Hubei, China
- Index case: Conakry
- Arrival date: 13 March 2020 (6 years, 7 months, 2 weeks and 1 day)
- Confirmed cases: 38,594 (updated 18 September 2026)
- Deaths: 468 (updated 18 September 2026)

Government website
- http://www.anss-guinee.org/

The COVID-19 pandemic in Guinea was a part of the worldwide pandemic of coronavirus disease 2019 (COVID-19) caused by severe acute respiratory syndrome coronavirus 2 (SARS-CoV-2). The virus was confirmed to have reached Guinea in March 2020.

== Background ==
On 12 January 2020, the World Health Organization (WHO) confirmed that a novel coronavirus was the cause of a respiratory illness in a cluster of people in Wuhan City, Hubei Province, China, which was reported to the WHO on 31 December 2019.

The case fatality ratio for COVID-19 has been much lower than SARS of 2003, but the transmission has been significantly greater, with a significant total death toll. Model-based simulations for Guinea suggest that the 95% confidence interval for the time-varying reproduction number R_{t} has been lower than 1.0 since July 2021.

== Timeline ==
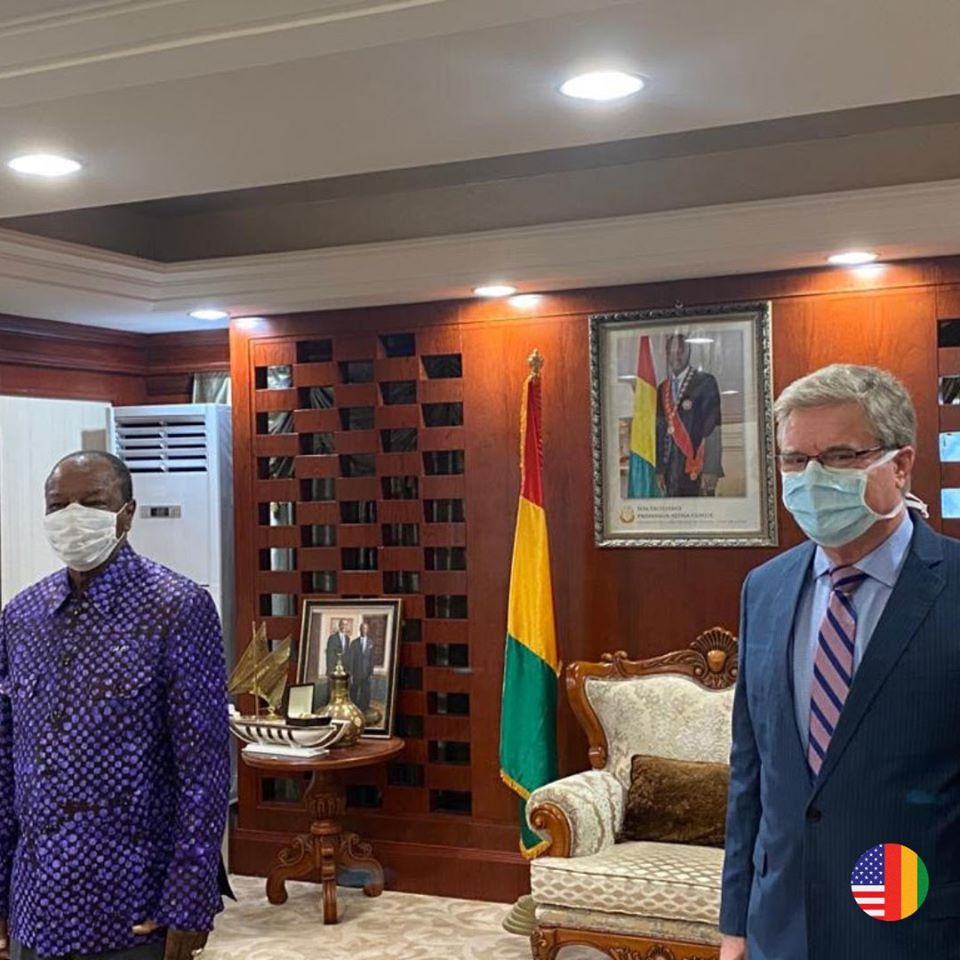
President Alpha Condé meets with U.S. Ambassador to Guinea Simon Henshaw to discuss the COVID-19 pandemic while both practice social distancing.

=== March 2020 ===
- On 13 March 2020, Guinea's first confirmed COVID-19 case was reported. A Belgian national who is an employee of the European Union delegation in Guinea has tested positive for COVID-19.
- Confirmed cases doubled from eight to 16 on 29 March.

=== April to June 2020 ===
- There were 1,479 new cases in April, raising the total number of confirmed cases to 1495. The death toll was 7. There were 329 recoveries, leaving 1,159 active cases at the end of the month.
- In May 2020, six people were killed by police at checkpoints in Coyah and Dubréka. Police spokesman Mory Kaba claimed that the individuals were protesting the checkpoints, which had been established to control the spread of COVID-19. Protesters stated that they were protesting extortion at the checkpoints. During the month there were 2,276 new cases, raising the total number of cases to 3,771. The death toll rose to 23. At the end of the month there were 1,653 active cases.
- Médecins Sans Frontières (MSF) sent help for Guinea's efforts at combatting the virus.
- There were 1,620 new cases in June, bringing the total number of cases to 5,391. The death toll rose to 33. There were 1,032 active cases at the end of the month.

=== Subsequent cases ===
- 2020 cases

There were 13,722 confirmed cases in 2020. 13,141 patients recovered while 81 persons died. At the end of 2020 there were 500 active cases.

- 2021 cases

Guinea received a small number of doses of the Sputnik V vaccine and became the first country in sub-Saharan Africa to inoculate some of its high-level officials. 194,400 doses of the Oxford-AstraZeneca COVID-19 vaccine were delivered on 11 April, courtesy of COVAX.

There were 18,949 confirmed cases in 2021, bringing the total number of cases to 32,671. 16,781 patients recovered in 2021 while 310 persons died, bringing the total death toll to 391. At the end of 2021 there were 2,358 active cases.

Modeling by WHO's Regional Office for Africa suggests that due to under-reporting, the true cumulative number of infections by the end of 2021 was around 5.9 million while the true number of COVID-19 deaths was around 2,800.

- 2022 cases

Samples taken between May and October showed that the rapidly spreading BA.5.2.1.7 variant was present in Guinea.

There were 5,539 confirmed cases in 2022, bringing the total number of cases to 38,210. 7,296 patients recovered in 2022 while 75 persons died, bringing the total death toll to 466. At the end of 2022 there were 526 active cases.

- 2023 cases

There were 362 confirmed cases in 2023, bringing the total number of cases to 38,572. Two persons died, bringing the total death toll to 468.

== Statistics ==
=== Confirmed new cases per day ===
View source data.

=== Confirmed deaths per day ===
View source data.

== See also ==
- COVID-19 pandemic in Africa
- COVID-19 pandemic by country and territory
