= History of Guinea =

The modern state of Guinea did not come into existence until 1958, but the history of the area stretches back well before European colonization. Its current boundaries were determined by the Berlin Conference (1884–1885) and the French, who ruled Guinea until 1958.

== West African empires ==
What is now Guinea was on the fringes of the major West African empires. The Ghana Empire is believed to be the earliest of these which grew on trade but contracted and ultimately fell due to the hostile influence of the Almoravids. It was in this period that Islam first arrived in the region.

The Sosso kingdom (12th to 13th centuries) briefly flourished in the void but the Islamic Mandinka Mali Empire came to prominence when Soundiata Kéïta defeated the Sosso ruler, Sumanguru Kanté at the semi-historical Battle of Kirina in c. 1235. The Mali Empire was ruled by Mansa (Emperors), the most famous being Kankou Moussa, who made a famous hajj to Mecca in 1324. Shortly after his reign the Mali Empire began to decline and was ultimately supplanted by its vassal states in the 15th century.

The most successful of these was the Songhai Empire, expanding its power from about 1460, and eventually surpassing the Mali Empire in both territory and wealth. It continued to prosper until a civil war over succession followed the death of Askia Daoud in 1582. The weakened empire fell to invaders from Morocco in 1591. The Moroccans proved unable to rule the kingdom effectively, however, and it split into many small kingdoms.

Starting in the 13th century, the Arab slave trade flourished in the region and the Gulf of Guinea. The slave trade was greatly expanded in the 15th century when Portugal established a number of trading posts in Guinea, purchasing exporting, and kidnapping captives as part of the Atlantic slave trade. Other European nations would eventually participate in the trade, which persisted into the mid 19th century.

== Kingdoms in Guinea ==
After the fall of the major West African empires, various kingdoms existed in what is modern day Guinea.

=== Futa Jallon ===
Fulani Muslims migrated to Futa Jallon in Central Guinea and established an Islamic state from 1735 to 1898 with a written constitution and alternate rulers.

=== Wassoulou Empire ===
The Wassoulou empire was a short-lived (1878–1898) empire, led by Samory Touré in the predominantly Malinké area of what is now upper Guinea and southwestern Mali (Wassoulou). It moved to Ivory Coast before being conquered by the French.

== Colonial era ==
Map of French West Africa circa 1913

Guinea's colonial period began with French military penetration into the area in the early to mid-19th century, as France replaced Portugal as the dominant European power in the region. The French exerted control by building forts and occupying coastal towns, then gradually expanding inland. The French Empire first administrated the territory as part of its Senegalese colony, later establishing the colony of Rivières du Sud in 1882 and finally the colony of French Guinea in 1891. French domination was assured by the defeat in 1898 of the armies of Samori Touré, the Mansa (or Emperor) of the Ouassoulou state and leader of Malinké descent, whose defeat gave France control of what today is Guinea and adjacent areas.

France negotiated Guinea's present boundaries in the late 19th and early 20th centuries with other nations, namely the British colony of Sierra Leone, Portuguese colonial Guinea (now Guinea-Bissau), and the United States-backed Liberia.

== Independence (1958) ==
In 1958 the French Fourth Republic collapsed due to political instability and its failures in dealing with its colonies, especially Indochina and Algeria. The founding of a Fifth Republic was supported by the French people, while French President Charles de Gaulle made it clear on 8 August 1958 that France's colonies were to be given a stark choice between more autonomy in a new French Community and immediate independence in the referendum to be held on 28 September 1958.

The other French colonies chose the former but Guinea – under the leadership of Ahmed Sékou Touré whose Democratic Party of Guinea (PDG) had won 56 of 60 seats in 1957 territorial elections – voted overwhelmingly for independence. The French withdrew quickly, destroying infrastructure and equipment along the way, and on October 2, 1958, Guinea proclaimed itself a sovereign and independent republic, with Sékou Touré as president.

=== Sékou Touré's rule (1958–1984) ===
French President Charles de Gaulle warned U.S. President Dwight D. Eisenhower not to embrace Guinea or France would leave NATO's integrated military structure and tell United States troops to leave France. As a result, the United States did not engage with the Touré government, in response Guinea quickly aligned with the Soviet Union—making it the Kremlin's first success story in Africa. Following France's withdrawal, Guinea adopted socialist policies. This alliance was short lived, however, as Guinea moved towards a Chinese model of socialism. Nevertheless, President John F. Kennedy and his Peace Corps director Sargent Shriver tried even harder than the Kremlin's Nikita Khrushchev. By 1963 Guinea had shifted away from Moscow into a closer friendship with Washington. Guinea relied more and more on aid and investment from the U.S. Even the relationship with France improved, after the election of Valéry Giscard d'Estaing as president, trade increased and the two countries exchanged diplomatic visits.

Another diplomatic initiative immediately following independence was the Union of African States, a pan-African alliance between Guinea and Ghana (later joined by Mali in 1961) that hoped to integrate the states through a common market, shared currency, and unified foreign policy. This alliance suffered from a lack of infrastructure, geographic distance between the member states, and divisions over foreign policy. It dissolved in 1963; relations between Guinea and Ghana remained cordial until Kwame Nkrumah’s removal from power in 1966.

By 1960, Touré had declared the PDG the only legal party. For the next 24 years, the government and the PDG were one. Touré was reelected unopposed to four seven-year terms as president, and every five years voters were presented with a single list of PDG candidates for the National Assembly. Advocating a hybrid African Socialism domestically and Pan-Africanism abroad, Touré quickly became a polarising leader, and his government became intolerant of dissent, imprisoning hundreds, and stifling free press.

At the same time, the Guinean government nationalised land, removed French appointed and traditional chiefs from power, and broke ties with French government and companies. Vacillating between support for the Soviet Union and (by the late 1970s) the United States, Guinea's economic situation became as unpredictable as its diplomatic line. Alleging plots and conspiracies against him at home and abroad, Touré's regime targeted real and imagined opponents, driving thousands of political opponents into exile.

In 1970, Portuguese forces, from neighboring Portuguese Guinea, staged Operation Green Sea, a raid into Guinea with the support of exiled Guinean opposition forces. Among other goals, the Portuguese military wanted to kill or capture Sékou Touré due his support of the PAIGC, a guerilla movement operating inside Portuguese Guinea. After several days of fierce fighting, the Portuguese forces retreated without achieving most of their goals. The regime of Sékou Touré increased the number of internal arrests and executions.

The Guinean Market Women's Revolt in 1977 resulted in the regime's softening of economic restrictions and began a turn away from the radical socialism previously practiced by the government.

Sékou Touré died on March 26, 1984, after a heart operation in the United States, and was replaced by Prime Minister Louis Lansana Beavogui, who was to serve as interim president pending new elections.

=== Lansana Conté's rule (1984–2008) ===
The PDG was due to elect a new leader on April 3, 1984. Under the constitution, that person would have been the only candidate for president. However, hours before that meeting, Colonels Lansana Conté and Diarra Traoré seized power in a bloodless coup. Conté assumed the role of president, with Traoré serving as prime minister until December.

Conté immediately denounced the previous regime's record on human rights, released 250 political prisoners and encouraged approximately 200,000 more to return from exile. He also made explicit the turn away from socialism, but this did little to alleviate poverty and the country showed no immediate signs of moving towards democracy.

In 1992, Conté announced a return to civilian rule, with a presidential poll in 1993 followed by elections to parliament in 1995 (in which his party – the Unity and Progress Party – won 71 of 114 seats.) Despite his stated commitment to democracy, Conté's grip on power remained tight. In September 2001 the opposition leader Alpha Condé was imprisoned for endangering state security, though he was pardoned 8 months later. He subsequently spent a period of exile in France.

In 2001 Conté organized and won a referendum to lengthen the presidential term and in 2003 begun his third term after elections were boycotted by the opposition. In January 2005, Conté survived a suspected assassination attempt while making a rare public appearance in the capital Conakry. His opponents claimed that he was a "tired dictator" whose departure was inevitable, whereas his supporters believed that he was winning a battle with dissidents. Guinea still faces very real problems and according to Foreign Policy is in danger of becoming a failed state.

In 2000 Guinea became embroiled in the instability which had long blighted the rest of West Africa as rebels crossed the borders with Liberia and Sierra Leone and it seemed for a time that the country was headed for civil war. Conté blamed neighbouring leaders for coveting Guinea's natural resources, though these claims were strenuously denied. In 2003 Guinea agreed plans with her neighbours to tackle the insurgents. In 2007 there were big protests against the government, resulting in the appointment of a new prime minister.

=== Conté's death and the 2008 coup d'état ===
In a coup d'état several days following Touré's death, Lansana Conté became the President. The constitution and parliament were suspended and a committee for national recovery was established. Conté remained in power until his death on 22 December 2008.

In several hours following his death, Moussa Dadis Camara seized control of Guinea as the head of a junta. On 28 September 2009, the junta ordered its soldiers to attack people who had gathered to protest Camara's presumed candidacy in the upcoming presidential elections. The soldiers went on a rampage of rape, mutilation, and murder.

On 3 December 2009, an aide shot Camara during a dispute about the rampage of September 2009. Camara went to Morocco for medical care. Vice-president (and defense minister) Sékouba Konaté flew back from Lebanon to run the country in Camara's absence.

On 12 January 2010 Camara was flown from Morocco to Burkina Faso. After meeting in Ouagadougou on 13 and 14 January, Camara, Konaté and Blaise Compaoré, President of Burkina Faso, produced a formal statement of twelve principles promising a return of Guinea to civilian rule within six months. It was agreed that the military would not contest the forthcoming elections, and Camara would continue his convalescence outside Guinea. On 21 January 2010 the military junta appointed Jean-Marie Doré as Prime Minister of a six-month transition government, leading up to elections.

The presidential election was set to take place on 27 June and 18 July 2010, it was held as being the first free and fair election since independence in 1958. The first round took place normally on 27 June 2010 with ex Prime Minister Cellou Dalein Diallo and his rival Alpha Condé emerging as the two runners-up for the second round. However, due to allegations of electoral fraud, the second round of the election was postponed until 19 September 2010. A delay until 10 October was announced by the electoral commission (CENI), subject to approval by Sékouba Konaté. Yet another delay until 24 October was announced in early October. Elections were finally held on 7 November. Voter turnout was high, and the elections went relatively smoothly.

16 November 2010, Alpha Condé, the leader of the opposition party Rally of the Guinean People (RGP), was officially declared the winner of a 7 November run-off in Guinea's presidential election. He had promised to reform the security sector and review mining contracts if elected.

On the night of 18 July 2011, President Condé's residence was attacked in an attempted coup. The attack included a fierce firefight and rocket propelled grenades. The president was unharmed. Sixteen people have been charged with the attempted assassination. Most of those indicted are close associates of Konaté.

The National Assembly of Guinea, the country's legislative body, has not met since 2008 when it was dissolved after the military coup in December. Elections have been postponed many times since 2007 and, most recently, were scheduled for 8 July 2012. In April 2012, President Condé postponed the elections indefinitely, citing the need to ensure that they were "transparent and democratic".

In February 2013, a plane carrying the head of the Guinean armed forces, General Kelefa Diallo, and nine other military officials, crashed on its way to the Liberian capital, Monrovia.

==== 2013 protests ====
The opposition coalition withdrew from the electoral process in mid-February, mainly due to President Conde's insistence on using a suspicious South African firm Waymark Infotech to draw up the registered voter list. In late February 2013, political violence erupted in Guinea after protesters took to the streets to voice their concerns over the transparency of the upcoming May 2013 elections. The demonstrations were fueled by the opposition coalition's decision to step down from the electoral process in protest at the lack of transparency in the preparations for elections.

Nine people were killed during the protests, while around 220 were injured, and many of the deaths and injuries were caused by security forces using live fire on protesters. The political violence also led to inter-ethnic clashes between the Fula and Malinke peoples, the latter forming the base of support for President Condé, with the former consisting mainly of the opposition. On 26 March 2013 the opposition party backed out of the negotiation with the government over the upcoming 12 May election. The opposition claimed that the government has not respected them, and have not kept any promises they agreed to. This is expected to lead to more protests and fighting in the streets of Guinea.

=== 2014 Ebola outbreak ===
Beginning in July 2014, Guinea suffered the most severe recorded outbreak of Ebola in history, which rapidly spread to neighbouring countries Liberia and Sierra Leone. The epidemic was over by June 2016.

=== 2020 elections ===
In October 2020, president Alpha Condé won presidential elections. Condé had been in power since 2010 and he won the third term. Opposition did not accept the results because of allegations of fraud. The president said a constitutional referendum in March 2020 allowed him to run despite a two-term limit. After the election there were violent protests across the country.

=== 2021 coup d'état ===
On September 5, 2021, Alpha Condé was deposed by the military. National Committee of Reconciliation and Development headed by Mamady Doumbouya took power. On 1 October 2021, Colonel Mamady Doumbouya, who led the previous month's coup, was sworn in as interim president of Guinea.

== See also ==
- List of heads of government of Guinea
- List of heads of state of Guinea
