= Binta (given name) =

- Gender: Female
- Language: Multiple, ultimately derived from Arabic

Origin
- Origin: West Africa
- Meaning: Daughter

Other names
- Variant forms: Bintou, Bintu

Binta // is a feminine name of West African origin, popular among Islamised peoples in Burkina Faso, Guinea, Mauritania, Mali, Senegal, Sierra Leone, Niger, Nigeria, and The Gambia. It can also rendered as Bintu (Bintou being Francophone). It is derived from the Arabic بنت (bint), which means "daughter" or "girl". In turn, Binta and its variants are occasionally reserved for first-born daughters.

Notable people with the name include:

== Nickname ==
- Jean "Binta" Breeze (1956–2021), Jamaican dub poet and storyteller

== Given name ==
- Binta Ann, Guinean author and activist
- Binta Bello, Nigerian politician
- Binta Dada (c. 1922 – 2024), Nigerian matriarch
- Binta Diakité (born 1988), Ivorian football midfielder
- Binta Diakhaté (born 1994), Senegalese football forward
- Binta Zahra Diop (born 1990), Senegalese butterfly swimmer
- Binta Masi Garba (fl. 1999–present), Nigerian politician
- Binta Jambane (born 1942), Mozambican sprinter
- Binta Jammeh-Sidibe, Gambian women's rights activist
- Binta Mamman (fl. 2015–present), Nigerian politician
- Binta Mansaray, Sierra Leonean human rights advocate
- Binta Ayo Mogaji (born 1962 or 1963), Nigerian actress
- Binta Nyako, Nigerian judge
- Binta Pilote (1948–2020), Guinean pilot
- Binta Sarr (1954–2019), Senegalese women's rights activist
- Binta Sukai, Nigerian fashion consultant

== Middle name ==
- N'Deye Binta Dia (born 1973), Senegalese sprinter
- Fatoumata Binta Diallo, Guinean politician
- Fatoumata Binta Diallo (athlete) (born 2000), Guinean-born Portuguese track and field athlete
- Ndèye Binta Diongue (born 1988), Senegalese fencer

== Surname ==
- Fatmata Binta, Sierra Leonean chef

== Fictional character ==
- Binta, the main character of the 2004 Spanish film Binta and the Great Idea
