= List of presidents of the National Assembly of Guinea =

The president of the National Assembly of Guinea is the presiding officer of that legislature. As of February 5, 2022, the National Assembly exists in the form of a National Transitional Council headed by former lawmaker Dansa Kurouma

== Presidents of the Territorial Assembly ==
Name	Period
Framoi Bérété	1954–1956
Saifoulaye Diallo	1956–1958

== President of the Constituent Assembly ==
Name	Period
Saifoulaye Diallo	1958

== Presidents of the National Assembly (1958-1974) ==
Name	Period
Saifoulaye Diallo	1958 - 1963
León Maka	1963–1974

== Presidents of the Popular Revolutionary Assembly (1974-1984) ==
Name	Period
Damantang Camara	1974–1984

== Presidents of the Legislature (1995-) ==
Name	Period	Legislative arm
Boubacar Biro Diallo	1995–2002	Of National Assembly
Aboubacar Somparé	2002–2008	Of National Assembly
Rabiatou Sérah Diallo	2010-2014	Of National Transitional Council
Claude Kory Kondiano	2014–2020	Of National Assembly
Amadou Damaro Camara	2020–2021	Of National Assembly
Dansa Kurouma	2022–present	Of National Council of the Transition
