= Bintou (given name) =

Bintou is a given name.

== People with the given name ==
- Bintou Camara, Malian football manager and former footballer
- Bintou Dembélé, French dancer
- Bintou Diémé, French-Senegalese basketball player
- Bintou Keita, Guinean United Nations diplomat
- Bintou Koité (born 1995), Malian footballer
- Bintou Malloum (1946–2020), Chadian politician and dfiplomat
- Bintou Sango, Burkina Faso politician
- Bintou Sanankoua, Malian historian
- Bintou Touré, Guinean politician
- Fatouma Bintou Djibo, Burkina Faso UN official
- Fatou Bintou Fall, Senegalese sprinter

== See also ==
- Binjour
