= Fatoumata Binta Diallo =

Guinean politician

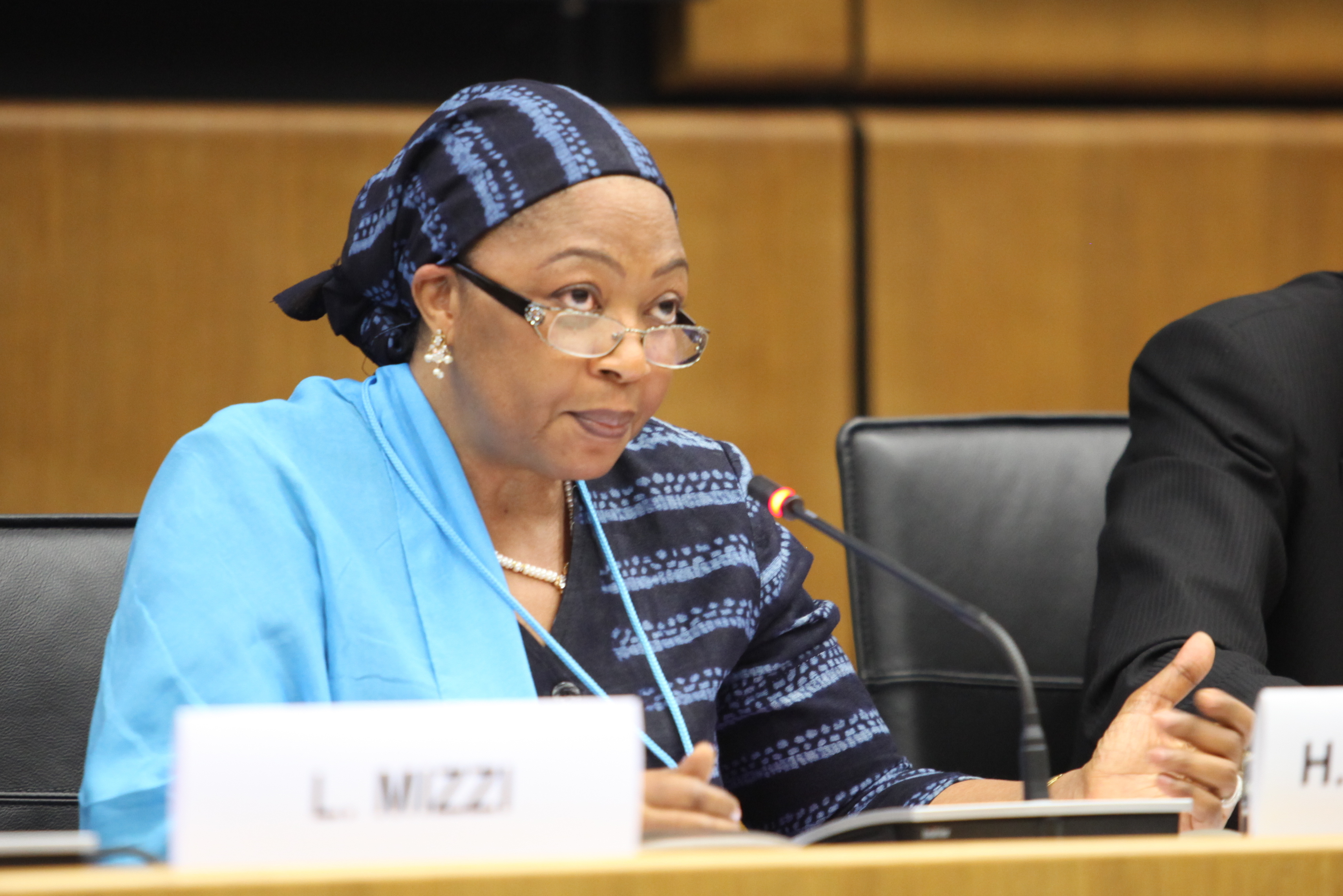

President of the Forum of Women Parliamentarians of Guinea.

Personal details
- Occupation: Politician

Fatoumata Binta Diallo is a politician in Guinea. A former Minister of Energy and Water and Minister for Industry, Small and Medium Enterprises and Private Sector Promotion she is currently president of the Forum of Women Parliamentarians of Guinea.

== Career ==
Fatoumata Binta Diallo is the daughter of former president of the National Assembly of Guinea Boubacar Biro Diallo. She is a member of the Guinean National Assembly for the constituency of Koundara. Binta Diallo was a member of the Union of Democratic Forces of Guinea.

Binta Diallo has served in the cabinet of Guinea as Minister for Energy and Water. In 2015 and 2016 she was Minister for Industry, Small and Medium Enterprises and Private Sector Promotion under President Alpha Condé. Binta Diallo switched allegiance to the Guinean People's Assembly in October 2017.

Binta Diallo was elected president of the Forum of Women Parliamentarians of Guinea in July 2016, she had previously served as the body's treasurer. Her aims are to improve the representation of women in the Guinean parliament, local government and judiciary.

Binta Diallo encouraged author Adnan Qureshi to travel to Guinea to document the 2013-1016 West African Ebola virus epidemic.
