= Framoi Bérété =

Guinean accountant and politician

President of the Guinean Territorial Assembly
- In office 1954–1956
- Succeeded by: Saifoulaye Diallo

Member of the Territorial Assembly
- In office 1946–1957
- Succeeded by: Fodéba Keïta
- Constituency: Siguiri

Personal details
- Born: 1915
- Died: 1974 (aged 58–59) Conakry, Guinea
- Party: BAG
- Profession: Accountant · politician

Framoi Bérété (1915 – 1974) was a Guinean accountant and politician who served as President of the Guinean Territorial Assembly from 1954 to 1956. He served as a member of the Territorial Assembly from 1946 to 1957, representing Siguiri. He was the leader of the party Bloc africain de Guinée (BAG, African Bloc of Guinea), which led Guinea until being defeated in the 1957 election.

== Biography ==
Bérété was born in 1915. By profession, he was an accountant, and he worked for the Franco-African Commercial Bureau (Comptoir commercial franco-africain, CCFA) in Conakry. Also a political activist, he co-founded the Union du Mandé, a mutual aid association which aimed to "give national expression" to discontent among the Mandé peoples. He jointly-founded it along with other Maninka-speaking activists including Ahmed Sékou Touré. The Union also was a political party and nominated candidates for local elections.

Bérété began his political career with the Guinea Chamber of Commerce. In 1946, he won election to the Guinean Territorial Assembly, a predecessor of the National Assembly, representing Siguiri. He was the first African-born representative of Siguiri. During his time on the assembly, he was a member of the Transportation Advisory and Rice and Orange Oil Advisory Committees, and was president of the Coffee Price Stabilization Fund. He became president of the assembly in 1954, a position he held until 1956. In the mid-1950s, his Union du Mandé merged with other associations to create the moderate Bloc africain de Guinée party (BAG, African Bloc of Guinea), which was backed mainly by "customary leaders, influential merchants, and high-ranking civil servants." The BAG, led by Bérété, was the dominant political party of Guinea until the 1957 Guinean Territorial Assembly election, when they lost to the Democratic Party of Guinea led by Sékou Touré. In that election, Bérété lost his re-election bid to Fodéba Keïta. He remained active in politics, however, and by 1960, he was serving as Minister of National Economy. He was also the director of the Comptoir Guinéen du Commerce Extérieur.

During his tenure in the Territorial Assembly, Bérété led a campaign to "liberalize the gold market" in Guinea, joined by Sékou Touré and Mamba Sano. Speaking before the Territorial Assembly and the Grand Council in Dakar, he noted that the French administration had artificially set low prices for gold in Guinea, a price that was half as much as in British Africa. His advocacy contributed to the removal of gold restrictions by the administration in 1950. Around the same time, the French had launched a project to "improve" mining techniques in Siguiri, dispatching an engineer named Blouin to teach them. This came shortly after a exploration permit for Guinean gold mines had been requested by a French financier, leading many local mining chiefs to believe that Blouin was only there "to scope out productive gold deposits that could be exploited by French firms." Bérété wrote an editorial in the newspaper Voix de la Guinée, stating that:

For several months, the engineer is sent to study, interview, and observe in the circle. "Is it really to improve our methods of exploiting gold?" the natives ask with suspicion. "Or is it to delineate new gold mining areas for capitalists?"

In his editorial, Bérété described being concerned that one of the figures behind the exploration permit was Eduard Julian, an official for the Service of Geology who had previously been sent by the French to help develop mining techniques. The permit was requesting to take the mining fields away from the orpailleurs (African gold prospectors) and instead give control of them to "a single French enterprise." Bérété argued that these gold mines were a "natural patrimony" that deserved to be preserved for "thousands of Africans coming from Senegal, Guinea, Soudan, and Côte d'Ivoire," and said that they should be controlled by Africans instead of being "industrialized" by European powers. Eventually, the French permit request was rejected by the governor and General Council.

Bérété held the titles of Knight of the Legion of Honour, Knight of the Black Star of Benin, Knight of Commercial Merit, and Grand Officer of the Universal League of Public Good (Ligue Universelle du Bien Public). He died in 1974, in Conakry.
