= Malloum =

Malloum is a surname. Notable people with the surname include:

- Bintou Malloum (1946–2020), Chadian politician and diplomat
- Félix Malloum (1932–2009), Chadian politician
