= Aboubacar Soumah =

Guinean politician

Deputy in the National Assembly (Guinea)
- President: Alpha Conde
- Constituency: National List

Personal details
- Party: Guinée pour la démocratie et l'équilibre (GDE)
- Committees: Mines and Industries

Aboubacar Soumah is a Guinean politician. He was elected to the National List in the National Assembly (Guinea). He is the President of the Opposition Guinea for Democracy and Balance Party (Guinée pour la démocratie et l'équilibre (GDE)).
