= Dominique Kpoghomou =

Guinean politician

Dominique Zabia Kpoghomou
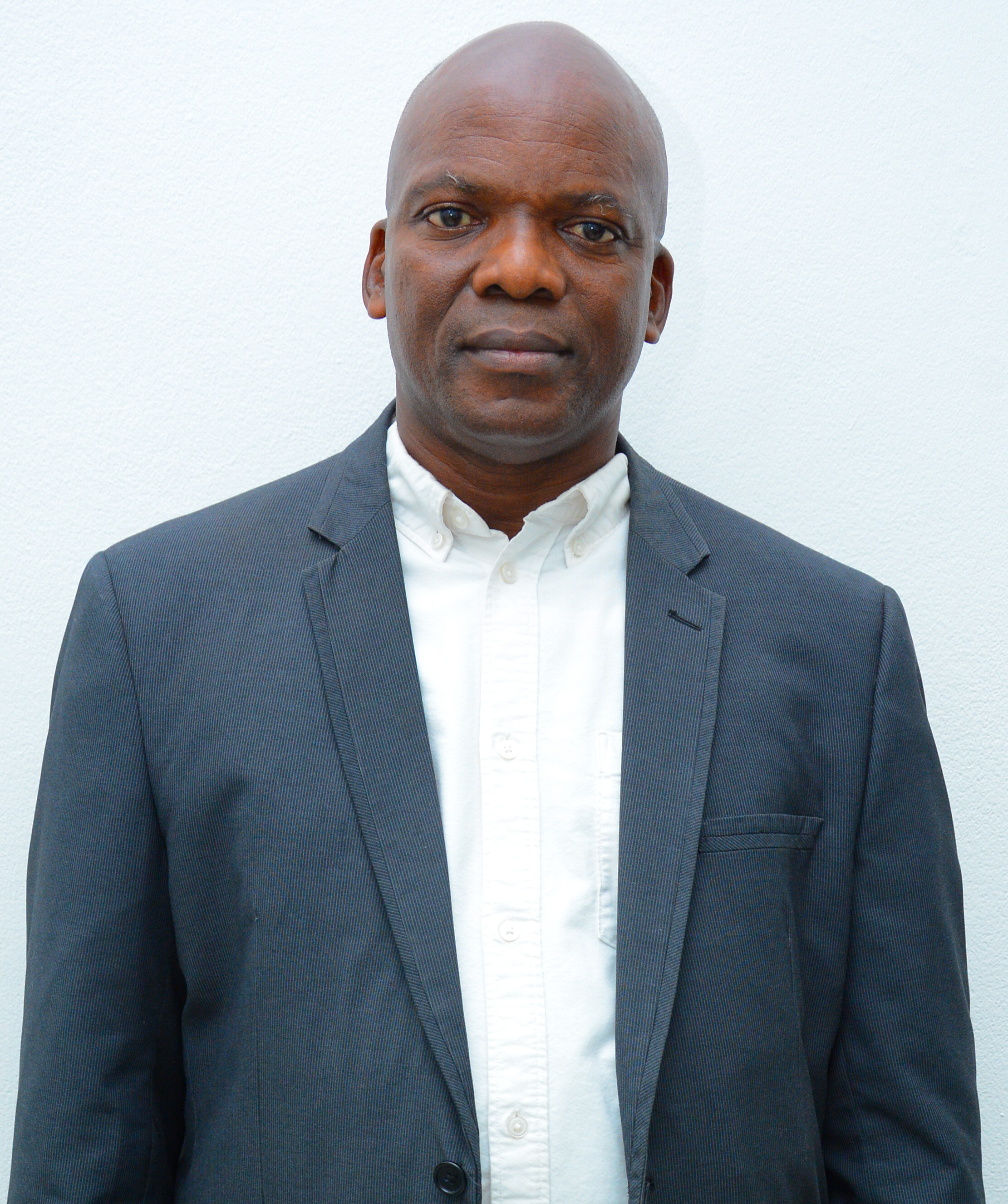

Member of the Conseil national de la transition
- Incumbent
- Assumed office January 2022

Personal details
- Occupation: Educator, Politician

Dominique Zabia Kpoghomou is a Guinean educator and politician.

Since January 2022, he has served as a counselor within the Conseil national de la transition (CNT) of the Republic of Guinea under the leadership of Dansa Kourouma.

== Biography ==
=== Education ===
In 2019, he obtained his Master of Arts (Educational Technology) from Concordia University.

=== Career ===
Since December 2011, he has been the international coordinator of the NGO CHEFAIDE and an advisor to the Canadian company SIRETA.CA.

Since 2013, he has been among the promoters of the "Maison de Guinée" in Montreal, Quebec, which opened its doors in 2015.

In 2014, during the Ebola virus epidemic, he served as the interim president of the Association des jeunes Guinéens de Montréal. In this role, he advocated for the repatriation of Guinean Canadians and all Canadians in Guinea.

=== Political career ===
On January 22, 2022, Dominique Kpoghomou was appointed by decree as a member of the Conseil national de la transition representing civil society activists.

== Publications ==
Creating the French Version of the « Quebec Society Course » taught online, through Moodle, at Carleton University, 2015.
