= Aissata Mariama Soumah =

Guinean politician

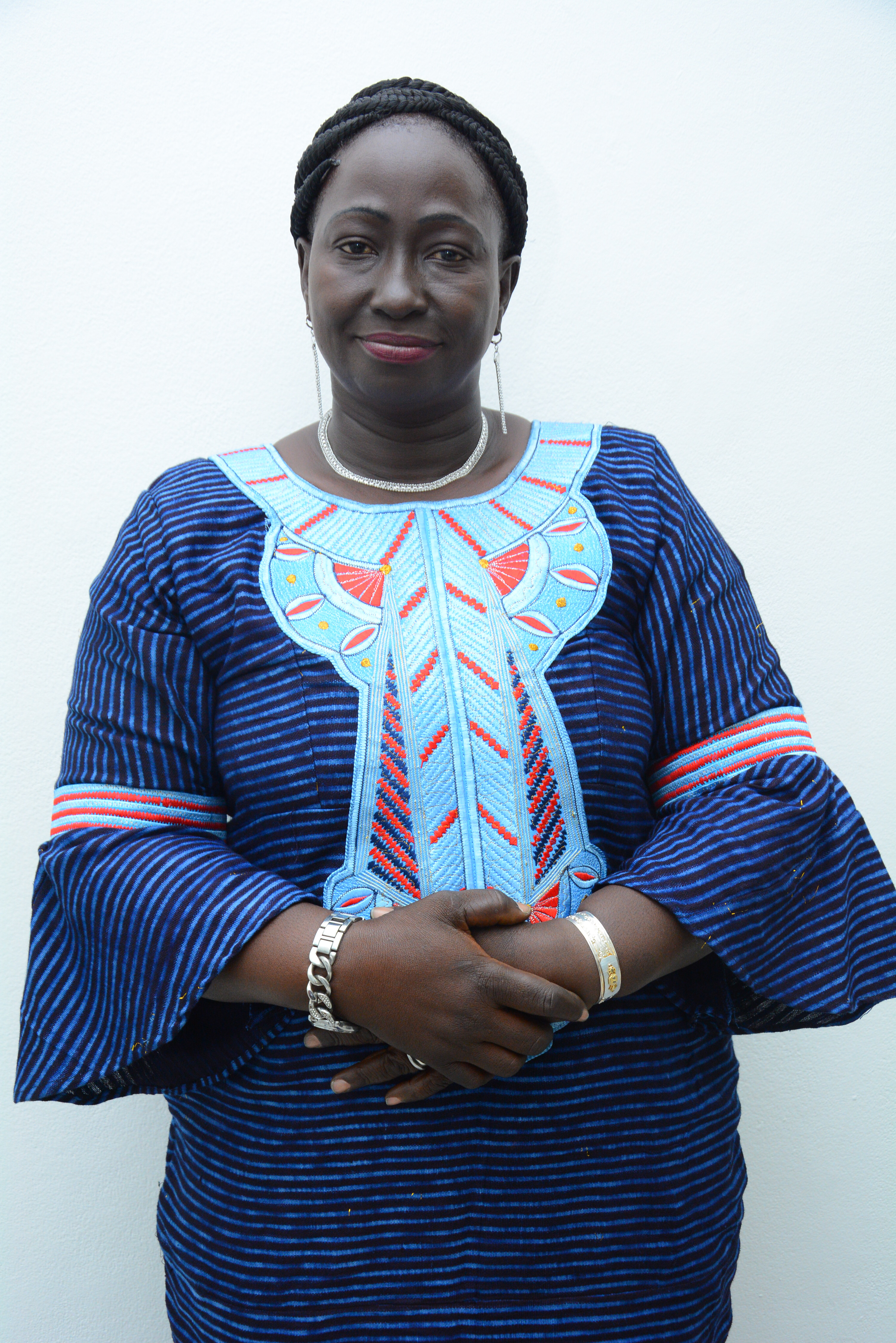
Aissata Mariama Soumah

Aissata Mariama Soumah is a Guinean politician.

Soumah is a member of the National Council of the Transition, the acting state legislative body of the Republic of Guinea.
