= Djibo (surname) =

Djibo is a surname of Nigerien origin. Notable people with the surname include:

- Amadou Ali Djibo, Nigerien politician
- Fatou Djibo (1927–2016), Nigerien women's rights activist, feminist, educator and trade unionist
- Fatouma Bintou Djibo, Burkinabé women diplomat
- Hamidou Djibo (born 1985), Nigerien football striker
- Salou Djibo (born 1965), Nigerien Army officer
