= Binta =

Binta can refer to:

- Binta (given name), feminine given name
- Binta International School, group of schools in Lagos State, Nigeria
- Binta Lake, lake in the Regional District of Bulkley-Nechako, British Columbia, Canada
- Vinta, type of traditional outrigger boat in the Philippines
