= 2026 Guinean parliamentary election =

- 31 May 2026

All 147 seats to the National Assembly 74 seats needed for a majority
- Turnout: 53.85% (▼4.19pp)
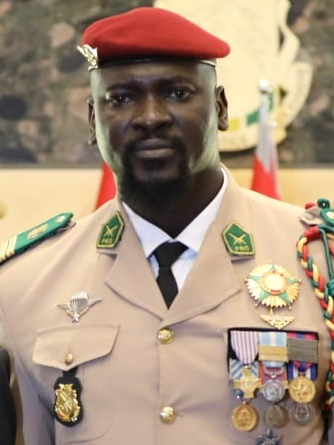
	First party
Leader	Mamady Doumbouya
Party	GMD
Seats won	93
Seat change	▲93
Percentage	67.29%
Swing	New party

Parliamentary elections were held in Guinea on 31 May 2026. This was the first legislative election since the 2021 Guinean coup d'état, in which President Alpha Condé was deposed by General Mamady Doumbouya.

Guinea presented the election as the final step in its post-coup democratic transition, however major opposition parties were barred from running. Doumbouya's electoral coalition, the Generation for Modernity and Development, received 64% of the vote and 93 of the 147 seats in the National Assembly; with its allies, the coalition received over 100 seats. The opposition boycotted the election, with observers noting low voter turnout.

== Background ==
Military general Mamadi Doumbouya has led Guinea since the 2021 Guinean coup d'état, which deposed the previous president Alpha Condé. Amnesty International has described a "climate of terror" following the coup, as the military junta has cracked down on opposition parties, civil society, and journalists. By September 2025, more than 220 people had been killed for opposing the government.

In September 2025, a constitutional referendum passed, which extended the term limits of the presidency and reformatted the Senate. In December 2025, Doumbouya was elected president. Regional blocs ECOWAS and the African Union lifted their sanctions on Guinea following the election, citing a transition to democracy. However, United Nations rights commissioner Volker Turk observed that the suppression of opposition parties and the media risked "undermining the credibility of the electoral process".

On 6 March 2026, the General Directorate of Elections dissolved 40 political parties, including the three main opposition parties in the country: Union of Democratic Forces of Guinea (UDFG), Rally of the Guinean People, and Union of Republican Forces. The opposition initiated a boycott of the legislative election in response. UDFG's exiled leader and former prime minister, Cellou Dalein Diallo, called for "direct resistance". Several ministers of the National Council of the Transition controversially had their candidacies approved, despite the council's charter prohibiting its members from running for office.

On 10 April 2026, Doumbouya announced the postponement of the elections to 31 May 2026 from 24 May 2026. The campaign period opened on 1 May and ended on 28 May. Local elections take place at the same time. The opposition Democratic Front of Guinea said one of its candidates was attacked by hooded individuals in Mamou on 30 May.

== Electoral system ==
The 2025 constitutional referendum approved a bicameral legislature. The lower chamber, the National Assembly, will be directly elected. It will have 147 seats: 98 constituency seats and 49 national seats allocated to provide proportional representation using a closed list. Of the 98 constituency seats, 21 are elected by first-past-the-post in single-member constituencies (including 4 elected by overseas diaspora voters), and 76 are elected by plurality block voting in 29 constituencies ranging in size from two to five seats.

Following the legislative election, two-thirds of the Senate will be indirectly elected and one-third of the Senate will be appointed by the president per the new constitution.

== Results ==
The following are the provisional results from the General Directorate of Elections. According to the provisional results, 3,741,573 voters cast their ballots for a turnout of 52.87%. The final results are set to be certified by the Supreme Court of Guinea in mid-June.

Party	Proportional			Constituency			Total seats
Party	Votes	%	Seats	Votes	%	Seats	Total seats
Union pour un mouvement populaire	636,900	18.45	9				9
Nouveau départ	494,714	14.33	7				7
Rassemblement guinéen pour le travail	493,714	14.30	7				7
Force des intègres pour la démocratie et la liberté	422,826	12.25	6	5,561	0.16	0	6
Union pour la démocratie et le développement	352,439	10.21	5				5
Front pour l'alliance nationale	141,076	4.09	2	29,056	0.83	0	2
Partie de l'action citoyenne par le travail	70,788	2.05	1				1
Rassemblement des guinéens pour l'alternance	70,738	2.05	1	21,517	0.62	0	1
Bloc libéral	70,688	2.05	1	45,987	1.31	0	1
Parti des démocrates pour l'espoir	70,668	2.05	1	23,505	0.67	0	1
Rassemblement pour la démocratie nationale	70,638	2.05	1				1
Alliance pour le renouveau et le progrès	70,538	2.04	1				1
Avenir Guinée nouvelle	70,488	2.04	1	46,766	1.34	3	4
Nouvelle génération pour la république	70,438	2.04	1	25,044	0.72	0	1
Union démocratique de Guinée	70,388	2.04	1	102,943	2.94	0	1
Rassemblement pour une Guinée prospère	68,500	1.98	1				1
Alternance démocratique pour le changement	67,800	1.96	1				1
Union des forces du changement	65,333	1.89	1				1
Rassemblement pour la réissance et le développement	66,100	1.91	1				1
Union pour la défense des intérêts républicains	2,001	0.06	0				0
Notre intérêt commun	1,003	0.03	0				0
Rassemblement pour la république	1,002	0.03	0				0
Union pour le progrès et le renouveau	1,000	0.03	0	59,260	1.69	0	0
Union pour la nouvelle Guinée	999	0.03	0	13,159	0.38	0	0
Mouvement national pour le développement	998	0.03	0				0
Nouvelles forces démocratiques de Guinée	997	0.03	0				0
Generation for Modernity and Development				2,354,014	67.29	93	93
Front démocratique de Guinée				258,008	7.37	1	1
Mouvement sacrois				77,154	2.21	0	0
Union nationale des patriotes de Guinée				51,105	1.46	0	0
Kindia 2026				40,426	1.16	0	0
Mô Beyla Kô Lema				39,602	1.13	0	0
Citoyens en action pour sauver Macenta				32,395	0.93	0	0
Espoir de Dubréka				30,640	0.88	0	0
Mouvement Mandiana pour le progrès				24,142	0.69	0	0
Alliance des jeunes et femmes de Kissidougou				22,470	0.64	0	0
Mouvement synergie et progrès				22,295	0.64	0	0
Dynamique citoyenne pour l'émergence				21,600	0.62	0	0
Justice, unité, paix pour la nation				17,066	0.49	0	0
Nouvelle vision de Gaoual				16,520	0.47	0	0
Kérouané unique pour la prospérité				13,712	0.39	0	0
Lélouma emergente				12,284	0.35	0	0
Parti des guinéens pour la démocratie				11,847	0.34	0	0
Osons				11,345	0.32	1	1
Coalition citoyenne pour le développement de Manéah				10,410	0.30	0	0
Association des femmes balayeuses de Dalaba				10,339	0.30	0	0
Rassemblement pour la renaissance et le développement				9,426	0.27	0	0
Diaspora moteur de la renaissance guinéenne				7,446	0.21	0	0
Cause commune				7,415	0.21	0	0
Union des forces nouvelles de Guinée				6,338	0.18	0	0
Manéah-Fenara				5,885	0.17	0	0
Jeunesse consciente de Fria				5,519	0.16	0	0
Kaloum lanfé				4,945	0.14	0	0
Tous pour Daouda Conté				934	0.03	0	0
Parti Guinéen du consensus				170	0.00	0	0
Independents				178	0.01	0	0
Total	3,452,774	100.00	49	3,498,428	100.00	98	147
Valid votes	3,448,994	92.18		3,498,428	92.13		
Invalid/blank votes	292,664	7.82		298,957	7.87		
Total votes	3,741,658	100.00		3,797,385	100.00		
Registered voters/turnout	6,948,894	53.85		7,410,804	51.24		
Source: General Directorate of Elections

=== Results by constituency ===
Results by constituency

Boffa
Party	Votes	%	Seats
Generation for Modernity and Development	39,648	66.84	2
Union démocratique de Guinée	19,672	33.16	0
Total	59,320	100.00	2
Valid votes	59,320	89.46	
Invalid/blank votes	6,991	10.54	
Total votes	66,311	100.00	
Registered voters/turnout	100,344	66.08	

Boké
Party	Votes	%	Seats
Generation for Modernity and Development	81,506	48.53	4
Front démocratique de Guinée	36,346	21.64	0
Union démocratique de Guinée	26,589	15.83	0
Parti des démocrates pour l'espoir	23,505	14.00	0
Total	167,946	100.00	4
Valid votes	167,946	92.02	
Invalid/blank votes	14,566	7.98	
Total votes	182,512	100.00	
Registered voters/turnout	326,412	55.91	

Fria
Party	Votes	%	Seats
Generation for Modernity and Development	18,523	77.04	1
Jeunesse consciente de Fria	5,519	22.96	0
Total	24,042	100.00	1
Valid votes	24,042	89.08	
Invalid/blank votes	2,946	10.92	
Total votes	26,988	100.00	
Registered voters/turnout	41,912	64.39	

Gaoual
Party	Votes	%	Seats
Generation for Modernity and Development	22,562	57.73	1
Nouvelle vision de Gaoual	16,520	42.27	0
Total	39,082	100.00	1
Valid votes	39,082	89.79	
Invalid/blank votes	4,446	10.21	
Total votes	43,528	100.00	
Registered voters/turnout	76,289	57.06	

Koundara
Party	Votes	%	Seats
Front démocratique de Guinée	14,773	39.49	1
Generation for Modernity and Development	13,206	35.31	0
Rassemblement pour la renaissance et le développement	9,426	25.20	0
Total	37,405	100.00	1
Valid votes	37,405	91.95	
Invalid/blank votes	3,276	8.05	
Total votes	40,681	100.00	
Registered voters/turnout	66,738	60.96	

Dixinn
Party	Votes	%	Seats
Generation for Modernity and Development	24,078	77.47	1
Union démocratique de Guinée	7,001	22.53	0
Total	31,079	100.00	1
Valid votes	31,079	83.93	
Invalid/blank votes	5,949	16.07	
Total votes	37,028	100.00	
Registered voters/turnout	93,036	39.80	

Gbéssia
Party	Votes	%	Seats
Avenir Guinée nouvelle	22,192	36.43	3
Generation for Modernity and Development	21,653	35.55	0
Justice, unité, paix pour la nation	17,066	28.02	0
Total	60,911	100.00	3
Valid votes	60,911	78.88	
Invalid/blank votes	16,305	21.12	
Total votes	77,216	100.00	
Registered voters/turnout	237,294	32.54	

Kagbélen
Party	Votes	%	Seats
Generation for Modernity and Development	19,853	53.00	2
Front démocratique de Guinée	17,609	47.00	0
Total	37,462	100.00	2
Valid votes	37,462	82.66	
Invalid/blank votes	7,861	17.34	
Total votes	45,323	100.00	
Registered voters/turnout	165,372	27.41	

Kaloum
Party	Votes	%	Seats
Generation for Modernity and Development	9,186	65.01	1
Kaloum lanfé	4,945	34.99	0
Total	14,131	100.00	1
Valid votes	14,131	85.42	
Invalid/blank votes	2,411	14.58	
Total votes	16,542	100.00	
Registered voters/turnout	38,912	42.51	

Lambanyi
Party	Votes	%	Seats
Generation for Modernity and Development	14,286	39.77	2
Avenir Guinée nouvelle	11,004	30.63	0
Union des forces nouvelles de Guinée	6,338	17.64	0
Front démocratique de Guinée	4,293	11.95	0
Total	35,921	100.00	2
Valid votes	35,921	83.04	
Invalid/blank votes	7,337	16.96	
Total votes	43,258	100.00	
Registered voters/turnout	112,495	38.45	

Matam
Party	Votes	%	Seats
Osons	11,345	41.44	1
Generation for Modernity and Development	8,618	31.48	0
Cause commune	7,415	27.08	0
Total	27,378	100.00	1
Valid votes	27,378	81.67	
Invalid/blank votes	6,143	18.33	
Total votes	33,521	100.00	
Registered voters/turnout	90,481	37.05	

Matoto
Party	Votes	%	Seats
Generation for Modernity and Development	22,872	63.96	1
Front démocratique de Guinée	12,889	36.04	0
Total	35,761	100.00	1
Valid votes	35,761	81.27	
Invalid/blank votes	8,243	18.73	
Total votes	44,004	100.00	
Registered voters/turnout	149,919	29.35	

Ratoma
Party	Votes	%	Seats
Generation for Modernity and Development	11,138	46.08	1
Front démocratique de Guinée	7,470	30.91	0
Force des intègres pour la démocratie et la liberté	5,561	23.01	0
Total	24,169	100.00	1
Valid votes	24,169	83.60	
Invalid/blank votes	4,741	16.40	
Total votes	28,910	100.00	
Registered voters/turnout	106,372	27.18	

Sanoyah
Party	Votes	%	Seats
Generation for Modernity and Development	16,829	75.18	2
Front pour l'alliance nationale	5,557	24.82	0
Total	22,386	100.00	2
Valid votes	22,386	82.98	
Invalid/blank votes	4,593	17.02	
Total votes	26,979	100.00	
Registered voters/turnout	77,492	34.82	

Sonfonia
Party	Votes	%	Seats
Generation for Modernity and Development	16,152	43.41	2
Avenir Guinée nouvelle	10,904	29.31	0
Front démocratique de Guinée	10,151	27.28	0
Total	37,207	100.00	2
Valid votes	37,207	81.50	
Invalid/blank votes	8,444	18.50	
Total votes	45,651	100.00	
Registered voters/turnout	172,320	26.49	

Tombolia
Party	Votes	%	Seats
Generation for Modernity and Development	25,836	56.18	2
Front démocratique de Guinée	20,155	43.82	0
Total	45,991	100.00	2
Valid votes	45,991	79.66	
Invalid/blank votes	11,744	20.34	
Total votes	57,735	100.00	
Registered voters/turnout	178,257	32.39	

Manéah
Party	Votes	%	Seats
Generation for Modernity and Development	12,766	43.93	1
Coalition citoyenne pour le développement de Manéah	10,410	35.82	0
Manéah-Fenara	5,885	20.25	0
Total	29,061	100.00	1
Valid votes	29,061	84.16	
Invalid/blank votes	5,469	15.84	
Total votes	34,530	100.00	
Registered voters/turnout	102,528	33.68	

Kassa
Party	Votes	%	Seats
Generation for Modernity and Development	1,919	100.00	1
Total	1,919	100.00	1
Valid votes	1,919	82.75	
Invalid/blank votes	400	17.25	
Total votes	2,319	100.00	
Registered voters/turnout	3,740	62.01	

Dabola
Party	Votes	%	Seats
Generation for Modernity and Development	58,050	100.00	2
Total	58,050	100.00	2
Valid votes	58,050	91.82	
Invalid/blank votes	5,173	8.18	
Total votes	63,223	100.00	
Registered voters/turnout	96,784	65.32	

Dinguiraye
Party	Votes	%	Seats
Generation for Modernity and Development	33,637	71.88	2
Union pour la nouvelle Guinée	13,159	28.12	0
Total	46,796	100.00	2
Valid votes	46,796	94.19	
Invalid/blank votes	2,887	5.81	
Total votes	49,683	100.00	
Registered voters/turnout	80,874	61.43	

Faranah
Party	Votes	%	Seats
Generation for Modernity and Development	90,703	76.79	2
Front démocratique de Guinée	27,412	23.21	0
Total	118,115	100.00	2
Valid votes	118,115	94.61	
Invalid/blank votes	6,732	5.39	
Total votes	124,847	100.00	
Registered voters/turnout	171,936	72.61	

Kissidougou
Party	Votes	%	Seats
Generation for Modernity and Development	89,861	80.00	2
Alliance des jeunes et femmes de Kissidougou	22,470	20.00	0
Total	112,331	100.00	2
Valid votes	112,331	96.21	
Invalid/blank votes	4,419	3.79	
Total votes	116,750	100.00	
Registered voters/turnout	154,866	75.39	

Kankan
Party	Votes	%	Seats
Generation for Modernity and Development	126,772	71.27	5
Union nationale des patriotes de Guinée	51,105	28.73	0
Total	177,877	100.00	5
Valid votes	177,877	93.87	
Invalid/blank votes	11,612	6.13	
Total votes	189,489	100.00	
Registered voters/turnout	351,967	53.84	

Kérouané
Party	Votes	%	Seats
Generation for Modernity and Development	73,914	84.35	2
Kérouané unique pour la prospérité	13,712	15.65	0
Total	87,626	100.00	2
Valid votes	87,626	98.39	
Invalid/blank votes	1,436	1.61	
Total votes	89,062	100.00	
Registered voters/turnout	113,204	78.67	

Kouroussa
Party	Votes	%	Seats
Generation for Modernity and Development	104,374	82.91	2
Rassemblement des Guinéens pour l'alternance	21,517	17.09	0
Total	125,891	100.00	2
Valid votes	125,891	97.12	
Invalid/blank votes	3,733	2.88	
Total votes	129,624	100.00	
Registered voters/turnout	168,772	76.80	

Mandiana
Party	Votes	%	Seats
Generation for Modernity and Development	233,007	90.61	4
Mouvement Mandiana pour le progrès	24,142	9.39	0
Total	257,149	100.00	4
Valid votes	257,149	99.57	
Invalid/blank votes	1,116	0.43	
Total votes	258,265	100.00	
Registered voters/turnout	276,549	93.39	

Siguiri
Party	Votes	%	Seats
Generation for Modernity and Development	265,174	77.46	5
Mouvement sacrois	77,154	22.54	0
Total	342,328	100.00	5
Valid votes	342,328	96.02	
Invalid/blank votes	14,185	3.98	
Total votes	356,513	100.00	
Registered voters/turnout	657,310	54.24	

Coyah
Party	Votes	%	Seats
Generation for Modernity and Development	41,954	77.98	2
Parti des guinéens pour la démocratie	11,847	22.02	0
Total	53,801	100.00	2
Valid votes	53,801	87.91	
Invalid/blank votes	7,398	12.09	
Total votes	61,199	100.00	
Registered voters/turnout	128,240	47.72	

Dubréka
Party	Votes	%	Seats
Generation for Modernity and Development	45,843	59.94	3
Espoir de Dubréka	30,640	40.06	0
Total	76,483	100.00	3
Valid votes	76,483	86.11	
Invalid/blank votes	12,335	13.89	
Total votes	88,818	100.00	
Registered voters/turnout	192,152	46.22	

Forécariah
Party	Votes	%	Seats
Generation for Modernity and Development	53,533	53.80	2
Union démocratique de Guinée	23,673	23.79	0
Mouvement synergie et progrès	22,295	22.41	0
Total	99,501	100.00	2
Valid votes	99,501	92.66	
Invalid/blank votes	7,887	7.34	
Total votes	107,388	100.00	
Registered voters/turnout	160,718	66.82	

Kindia
Party	Votes	%	Seats
Generation for Modernity and Development	79,429	54.45	4
Kindia 2026	40,426	27.72	0
Union démocratique de Guinée	26,008	17.83	0
Total	145,863	100.00	4
Valid votes	145,863	88.03	
Invalid/blank votes	19,835	11.97	
Total votes	165,698	100.00	
Registered voters/turnout	303,071	54.67	

Télimélé
Party	Votes	%	Seats
Generation for Modernity and Development	59,405	73.33	2
Dynamique citoyenne pour l'émergence	21,600	26.67	0
Total	81,005	100.00	2
Valid votes	81,005	95.14	
Invalid/blank votes	4,134	4.86	
Total votes	85,139	100.00	
Registered voters/turnout	120,929	70.40	

Koubia
Party	Votes	%	Seats
Generation for Modernity and Development	16,087	52.66	1
Front démocratique de Guinée	8,707	28.50	0
Nouvelle génération pour la République	5,756	18.84	0
Total	30,550	100.00	1
Valid votes	30,550	93.99	
Invalid/blank votes	1,954	6.01	
Total votes	32,504	100.00	
Registered voters/turnout	48,164	67.49	

Labé
Party	Votes	%	Seats
Generation for Modernity and Development	28,841	37.54	3
Front démocratique de Guinée	28,707	37.36	0
Nouvelle génération pour la République	19,288	25.10	0
Total	76,836	100.00	3
Valid votes	76,836	90.82	
Invalid/blank votes	7,771	9.18	
Total votes	84,607	100.00	
Registered voters/turnout	193,382	43.75	

Lélouma
Party	Votes	%	Seats
Generation for Modernity and Development	19,007	60.74	1
Lélouma emergente	12,284	39.26	0
Total	31,291	100.00	1
Valid votes	31,291	92.62	
Invalid/blank votes	2,492	7.38	
Total votes	33,783	100.00	
Registered voters/turnout	580,546	5.82	

Mali
Party	Votes	%	Seats
Generation for Modernity and Development	52,364	69.41	2
Union pour le progrès et le renouveau	23,075	30.59	0
Total	75,439	100.00	2
Valid votes	75,439	96.53	
Invalid/blank votes	2,715	3.47	
Total votes	78,154	100.00	
Registered voters/turnout	110,858	70.50	

Tougué
Party	Votes	%	Seats
Generation for Modernity and Development	22,632	68.93	1
Front démocratique de Guinée	10,202	31.07	0
Total	32,834	100.00	1
Valid votes	32,834	95.34	
Invalid/blank votes	1,604	4.66	
Total votes	34,438	100.00	
Registered voters/turnout	46,084	74.73	

Dalaba
Party	Votes	%	Seats
Generation for Modernity and Development	28,780	73.57	1
Association des femmes balayeuses de Dalaba	10,339	26.43	0
Total	39,119	100.00	1
Valid votes	39,119	90.33	
Invalid/blank votes	4,188	9.67	
Total votes	43,307	100.00	
Registered voters/turnout	71,675	60.42	

Mamou
Party	Votes	%	Seats
Generation for Modernity and Development	61,554	61.84	2
Front démocratique de Guinée	37,981	38.16	0
Total	99,535	100.00	2
Valid votes	99,535	91.42	
Invalid/blank votes	9,337	8.58	
Total votes	108,872	100.00	
Registered voters/turnout	166,314	65.46	

Pita
Party	Votes	%	Seats
Generation for Modernity and Development	33,370	58.61	2
Union pour le progrès et le renouveau	23,564	41.39	0
Total	56,934	100.00	2
Valid votes	56,934	93.67	
Invalid/blank votes	3,848	6.33	
Total votes	60,782	100.00	
Registered voters/turnout	101,098	60.12	

Beyla
Party	Votes	%	Seats
Generation for Modernity and Development	54,948	58.12	3
Mô Beyla Kô Lema	39,602	41.88	0
Total	94,550	100.00	3
Valid votes	94,550	93.89	
Invalid/blank votes	6,154	6.11	
Total votes	100,704	100.00	
Registered voters/turnout	162,447	61.99	

Guéckédou
Party	Votes	%	Seats
Generation for Modernity and Development	81,110	77.54	2
Front pour l'alliance nationale	23,499	22.46	0
Total	104,609	100.00	2
Valid votes	104,609	95.51	
Invalid/blank votes	4,923	4.49	
Total votes	109,532	100.00	
Registered voters/turnout	146,042	75.00	

Lola
Party	Votes	%	Seats
Generation for Modernity and Development	44,224	77.80	1
Union pour le progrès et le renouveau	12,621	22.20	0
Total	56,845	100.00	1
Valid votes	56,845	93.16	
Invalid/blank votes	4,173	6.84	
Total votes	61,018	100.00	
Registered voters/turnout	81,234	75.11	

Macenta
Party	Votes	%	Seats
Generation for Modernity and Development	74,182	69.60	2
Citoyens en action pour sauver Macenta	32,395	30.40	0
Total	106,577	100.00	2
Valid votes	106,577	92.77	
Invalid/blank votes	8,304	7.23	
Total votes	114,881	100.00	
Registered voters/turnout	159,719	71.93	

Nzérékoré
Party	Votes	%	Seats
Generation for Modernity and Development	54,035	51.73	4
Bloc libéral	29,703	28.43	0
Front démocratique de Guinée	20,722	19.84	0
Total	104,460	100.00	4
Valid votes	104,460	90.82	
Invalid/blank votes	10,558	9.18	
Total votes	115,018	100.00	
Registered voters/turnout	230,046	50.00	

Yomou
Party	Votes	%	Seats
Generation for Modernity and Development	22,430	57.94	1
Bloc Libéral	16,284	42.06	0
Total	38,714	100.00	1
Valid votes	38,714	88.71	
Invalid/blank votes	4,925	11.29	
Total votes	43,639	100.00	
Registered voters/turnout	69,060	63.19	

Afrique
Party	Votes	%	Seats
Generation for Modernity and Development	19,379	65.71	1
Diaspora moteur de la renaissance guinéenne	7,446	25.25	0
Avenir Guinée nouvelle	2,666	9.04	0
Total	29,491	100.00	1
Valid votes	29,491	96.51	
Invalid/blank votes	1,068	3.49	
Total votes	30,559	100.00	
Registered voters/turnout	84,175	36.30	

Amérique
Candidate	Party	Votes	%	Seats
Aly Fadiga	Generation for Modernity and Development	293	41.21	1
Billo Sanoh	Independent	178	25.04	0
Thierno Bella Diallo	Parti Guinéen du consensus	170	23.91	0
Abdoulaye Souleymane Diallo	Front démocratique de Guinée	70	9.85	0
Total		711	100.00	1
Valid votes		711	97.40	
Invalid/blank votes		19	2.60	
Total votes		730	100.00	
Registered voters/turnout		9,217	7.92	
Source: Le pétit deputé

Asie
Party	Votes	%	Seats
Generation for Modernity and Development	1,546	100.00	1
Total	1,546	100.00	1
Valid votes	1,546	97.97	
Invalid/blank votes	32	2.03	
Total votes	1,578	100.00	
Registered voters/turnout	2,171	72.69	

Europe
Party	Votes	%	Seats
Generation for Modernity and Development	2,945	66.93	1
Tous pour Daouda Conté	934	21.23	0
Front démocratique de Guinée	521	11.84	0
Total	4,400	100.00	1
Valid votes	4,400	96.81	
Invalid/blank votes	145	3.19	
Total votes	4,545	100.00	
Registered voters/turnout	31,287	14.53	

== Analysis ==
Doumbouya's landslide victory was expected by observers, given that all the main opposition parties were banned in March. It further consolidated Doumbouya's political power, with GMD and its allies winning over 100 seats. The election was presented as the end of the democratic transition process initiated by Doumbouya following the 2021 coup. The Guinean Supreme Court is set to confirm the results by mid-June.

The conduct of the election was peaceful and monitored by ECOWAS and other countries. Observers noted that there was low voter turnout. Contributing factors include the banning of opposition parties, widespread boycotts from the opposition and their supporters, and a lack of voter confidence following the 2025 presidential election and constitutional referendum. The election took place four days after Eid al-Adha; many Guineans (Guinea is 80% Muslim) travelled far away from the constituencies that they were registered to vote in and had yet to return, including 10,000 pilgrims that had embarked on the Hajj.

Following the election, several opposition parties initiated a legal appeal contesting the results. The Democratic Front of Guinea and Avenir Guinée Nouvelle allegedly found irregularities between their tallies and the official results; Gbessia d'Abord joined the legal action because the General Directorate of Elections did not provide them with the data for 11 polling stations. The West Africa Network for Peacebuilding denounced functional failures in the electoral efforts, as well as "proven cases of corruption, pressure, and administrative interference". An Avenir Guinée Nouvelle candidate claimed that his name on the official tally was incorrectly swapped with that of another party member's, causing confusion at the polling station.
