= Generation for Modernity and Development =

Political coalition in Guinea

Generation for Modernity and Development Génération pour la modernité et le développement
- Abbreviation: GMD
- President: Mamadi Doumbouya
- Governing body: Campaign Committee
- Founded: 2025
- Headquarters: Conakry
- Colors: Dark Green
- Slogan: Bâtir ensemble! (Note: English: Building Together!)
- National Assembly: 93 / 147

Website
- gmd-be.gn

The Generation for Modernity and Development (GMD; French: Génération pour la modernité et le développement), officially known as the Generation for Modernity and Development - Building Together (French: Génération pour la modernité et le développement - Bâtir ensemble) is a political coalition in Guinea. It is the current ruling party of Guinea led by Mamady Doumbouya, the current president of Guinea who seized power in the 2021 Guinean coup d'état.

== History ==
Mamady Doumbouya is a Guinean general who ousted long-time president Alpha Condé from power in the 2021 Guinean coup d'état, with Doumbouya being sworn in as interim president on 1 October 2021.

The Generation for Modernity and Development was founded in 2025 to support Doumbouya's presidential campaign at the 2025 presidential elections. Elections for the National Assembly were held in 2026, where GMD candidates secured an overwhelming majority. During both elections, there were widespread allegations of electoral interference favoring Doumbouya, with opposition candidates being barred from running, intimidated, and arrested. Despite this, these elections were officially meant to provide a transition to civilian power following the coup.

== Electoral history ==
=== National Assembly ===
| Election | Party leader | Votes | % | Votes | % | Seats | +/– | Position | Result |
| Election | Party leader | Constituency | | Proportional | | Seats | +/– | Position | Result |
|---|---|---|---|---|---|---|---|---|---|
| 2026 | Mamady Doumbouya | 2,354,014 | 67.29% | | | 93 / 147 | ▲93 | ▲1st | Supermajority government |
