= Elhadj Dembo Sylla =

Guinean politician

Deputy in the National Assembly (Guinea)
- President: Alpha Conde

Personal details
- Born: 1956 (age 69–70) Boké, Guinea
- Party: Guinean Democratic Union
- Education: Gamal Abdel Nasser University of Conakry, Institut international d’administration publique, The Hague Academy of International Law, Université du Québec

Elhadj Dembo Sylla is a Guinean politician in the National Assembly (Guinea). He is President of the minority Parliamentary Group Alliance Patriotique.
