= Sény Camara =

Guinean educator and politician

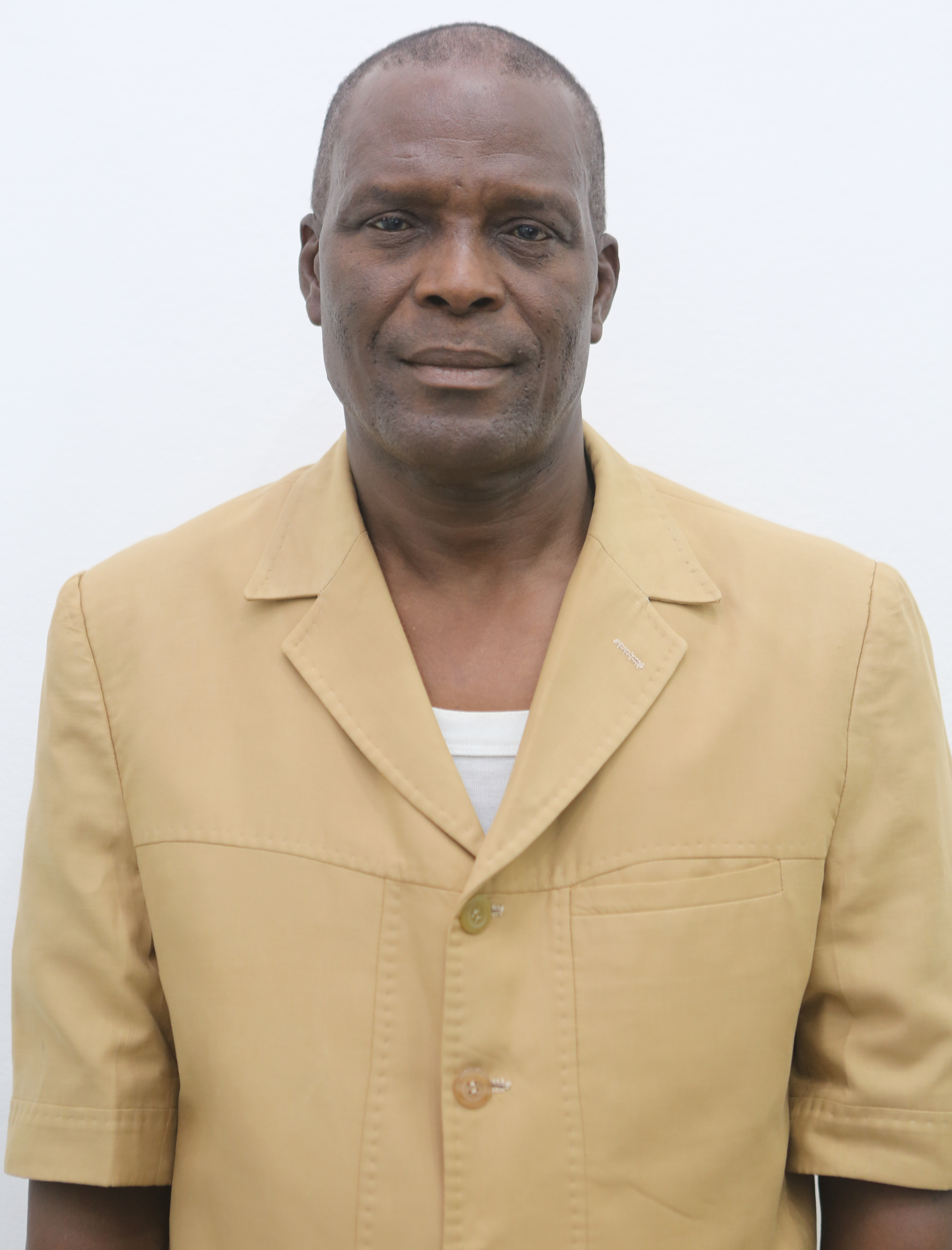

Personal details
- Born: 1 July 1958 (age 68) Boffa, Guinea
- Occupation: Teacher, Politician

Sény Camara (born 1 July 1958) is a Guinean educator and politician.

Since 22 January 2022 he has served as a counselor within the National Council of the Transition led by Dansa Kourouma.

== Biography ==
Camara previously served as the Secretary-General of the National Youth Committee of the Party of Unity and Progress.

On 22 January 2022 Camara was appointed by decree as a member of the Guinean National Transitional Council representing political parties, notably the PUP

== See also ==
- Dansa Kourouma
