= Senate of Guinea =

Upper house of the Parliament of Guinea

Senate of Guinea Le Sénat guinéen

Type
- Type: Upper house of the Parliament of Guinea

History
- Founded: 2026

Structure
- Seats: 87
- Length of term: 6 years

Elections
- Voting system: Indirect election (58 seats); Appointed by the President (29 seats)

The Senate (French: Le Sénat guinéen) is one of the two chambers of the bicameral Guinean Parliament established in the 2025 constitution in the unitary state of Guinea.

The Senate has 87 members. Two-third of the members are indirectly elected by an electoral college by local councillors. One-third of the members are appointed by the president of Guinea. Members serve a six-year term.

The Senate is less powerful than the lower chamber, National Assembly, and can affect only certain areas of legislation.

The Senate is expected to get organized after the 2026 elections.

== See also ==
- Politics of Guinea
