= Female genital mutilation in the Gambia =

- Other names: Female genital cutting; FGM/C
- Specialty: Public health
- Prevalence: 75% of girls and women aged 15–49

Female genital mutilation in the Gambia is the practice of removing all or part of the female genitalia for non-medical reasons. The practice remains prevalent in the country, although it has been legally prohibited since 2015. Female genital mutilation in the Gambia is the practice of removing all or part of the female's genitalia for cultural reasons, believed by those who practice it to affect sexual purity and obedience and required before marriage in some communities. The Gambia is one of 28 countries in Africa where female genital mutilation (FGM) is known to be practiced.

== Prevalence ==
Beginning in 2010, household surveys asked women about the FGM status of all their living daughters. Out of all countries where surveys were conducted, the highest prevalence of female genital mutilation among girls aged 0–14 was in the Gambia. (56 percent) According to a 2022 UNICEF report, 75 percent of Gambian girls aged 15–49 have been subjected to the practice and nearly two-thirds of them were cut before the age of five.

== Activism ==
The Gambia Committee on Traditional Practices Affecting the Health of Women and Children and Safe Hands for Girls, a local group, campaign to end the practice. Human rights experts and lawyers commented on the plans to revoke the 2015 bill, saying it would undo decades of work to end the practice. The UN urged the Gambia not to decriminalise the practice.

The United States of America is supportive of activists who seek to end the practice. In 2024, Fatou Baldeh was awarded an International Women of Courage Award at the White House.

== Legality ==
In 2015, the Gambia banned female genital mutilation. As of 2024, someone who is convicted of performing the practice could be given a fine of 50,000 dalasi (about 622 GBP or US$735) and/or up to three years in prison. Enforcement of the law has been limited with only two cases being prosecuted from its inception to 2024.

In 2023, the conviction of three women for mutilating eight infants led to debates in the country about the ban. Abdoulie Fatty, an influential Imam, paid the fines to release the convicted women from prison and started campaigning to lift the ban on female genital mutilation.

Members of the National Assembly of the Gambia backed a proposal to repeal the law. At the same time, the Gambia Supreme Islamic Council published a fatwa that requested the government to reconsider the 2015 ban while condemning anyone who criticizes female genital mutilation.

In 2024, 42 out of 47 members of the Gambia National Assembly voted in favor of sending a bill to a committee for review. This bill would overturn the 2015 ban. Following widespread protest and a human rights campaign, lawmakers reversed opinion and voted to keep the ban in place.

== See also ==
- Binta Jammeh-Sidibe, Gambian human rights activist and campaigner against FGM in the Gambia
