= Bintou Touré =

Guinean politician

Deputy in the National Assembly (Guinea)
- President: Alpha Conde

Personal details
- Party: Guinean Party for Progress and Development
- Committees: Commission for Health-Youth-Sports-Art and Culture

Bintou Touré is a Guinean politician in the National Assembly (Guinea). Bintou is a member of the Minority Guinean Party for Progress and Development, and is President of the Commission for Health-Youth-Sports-Art and Culture.
