= Binta Pilote =

Guinean pilot (1948–2020)

- Born: Fatoumata Binta Diallo; 1948; Labé, French Guinea
- Died: 29 April 2020 (aged 71–72); Paris, France
- Occupation: Pilot

Binta Pilote (1948 – 29 April 2020) was a Guinean pilot. She was the first black female helicopter pilot in Africa and the personal pilot of Ahmed Sékou Touré and Henriette Conté.

== Biography ==
Pilote enlisted in the Guinean Armed Forces in 1971. She trained with the Soviet Union in the town of Tokmak in present-day Ukraine, where she emerged as a captain.

She returned to Guinea in 1975 with the piloting team for the President. She piloted numerous important government officials, as well as foreign advisors. She was the youngest member of the Guinea National Assembly until the death of President Touré in 1984.

== Distinction ==
- Knight of the Guinea National Order of Merit
