= Boffa, Guinea =

Boffa
- Urban sub-prefecture and town
- Location in Guinea
- Coordinates: 10°10′N 14°02′W
- Country: Guinea
- Region: Boke Region
- Prefecture: Boffa Prefecture

Government
  - Mayor: Saidouba Kissing Camara

Population (2014)
  - Total: 8,631

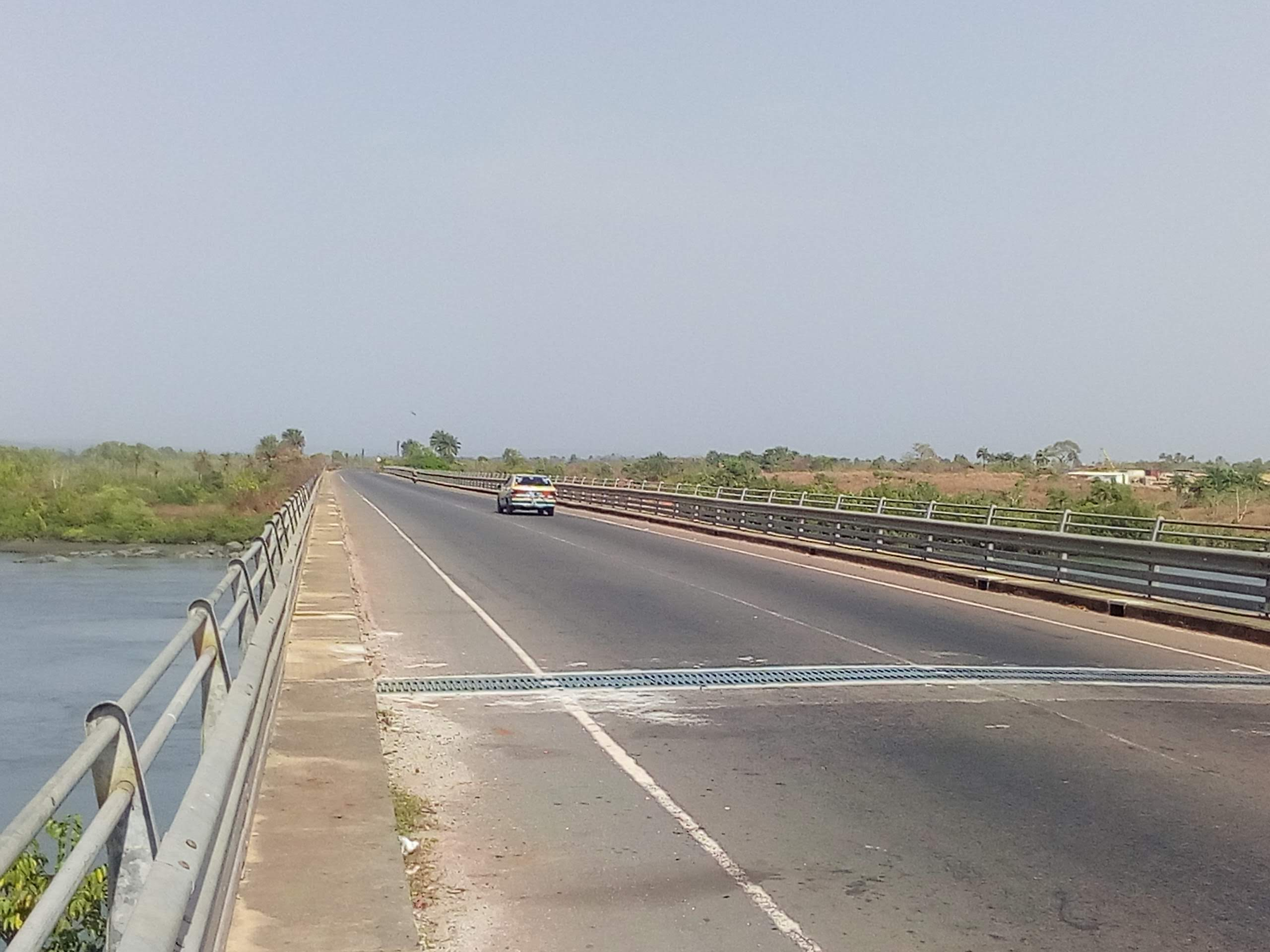
Bridge on Fatala River

Boffa is a town and sub-prefecture located on Guinea's coast. It is the capital of Boffa Prefecture. Boffa is the nearest town to the mouth of the River Pongo. As of 2014 it had a population of 8,631 people.

== Climate ==
Boffa has a tropical monsoon climate (Köppen climate classification Am).

Climate data for Boffa
Month	Jan	Feb	Mar	Apr	May	Jun	Jul	Aug	Sep	Oct	Nov	Dec	Year
Mean daily maximum °C (°F)	36.2 (97.2)	37.4 (99.3)	40.7 (105.3)	41.1 (106.0)	37.9 (100.2)	35.1 (95.2)	33.2 (91.8)	32.2 (90.0)	33.3 (91.9)	35.2 (95.4)	36.2 (97.2)	35.4 (95.7)	36.2 (97.1)
Daily mean °C (°F)	28.4 (83.1)	30.3 (86.5)	33.6 (92.5)	34.4 (93.9)	32.3 (90.1)	30.3 (86.5)	29.0 (84.2)	28.3 (82.9)	28.8 (83.8)	30.3 (86.5)	30.6 (87.1)	28.7 (83.7)	30.4 (86.7)
Mean daily minimum °C (°F)	20.6 (69.1)	23.3 (73.9)	26.5 (79.7)	27.8 (82.0)	26.7 (80.1)	25.6 (78.1)	24.8 (76.6)	24.5 (76.1)	24.4 (75.9)	25.5 (77.9)	25.1 (77.2)	22.1 (71.8)	24.7 (76.5)
Average rainfall mm (inches)	1 (0.0)	0 (0)	3 (0.1)	14 (0.6)	98 (3.9)	341 (13.4)	895 (35.2)	1,052 (41.4)	514 (20.2)	291 (11.5)	76 (3.0)	8 (0.3)	3,293 (129.6)
Source: Climate-data.org

== Notable people ==
- Sény Camara

== Hospitals ==
- Hôpital Préfectoral de Boffa

== Houses of Worship ==
- Grande Mosquée de Boffa
