= Claude Kory Kondiano =

Guinean politician (1942–2022)

President of the National Assembly of Guinea
- In office 13 January 2014 – 22 April 2020
- Preceded by: Aboubacar Somparé
- Succeeded by: Amadou Damaro Camara

Personal details
- Born: 1942 Kissidougou Prefecture, French Guinea, French West Africa
- Died: 27 September 2022 (aged 79–80) Conakry, Guinea
- Party: RPG
- Education: Paris 1 Panthéon-Sorbonne University; Sciences Po

Claude Kory Kondiano (1942 – 27 September 2022) was a Guinean politician of the Rally of the Guinean People (RPG).

== Biography ==
Married and a father of five children, Kondiano completed his secondary studies at the École Benedict Fribourg. He then studied at the institute of social sciences at Paris 1 Panthéon-Sorbonne University from 1966 to 1968 and at Sciences Po from 1970 to 1972.

Upon his return to Guinea, Kondiano held several administrative positions in the government from the 1980s to 2013, as well as working as a private consultant. From 13 January 2014 to 22 April 2020, he served as president of the National Assembly. He was also an advisor to President Alpha Condé from 20 June 2020 to 5 September 2021.

Claude Kory Kondiano died in Conakry on 27 September 2022.
