= Amadou Damaro Camara =

Guinean politician

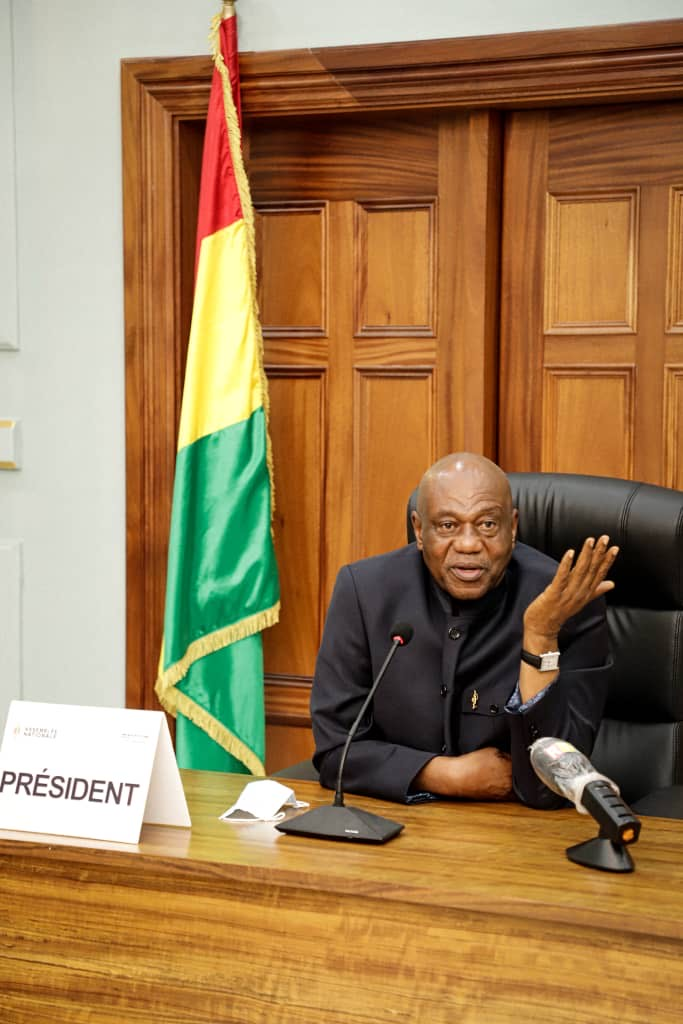

Amadou Damaro Camara (born 1952) is a politician from Guinea who served as President of the National Assembly of Guinea from 2020 to September 2021. In April 2022, he was jailed. In 2024, he was sentenced to 4 years in prison and a fine.
