= Binta Jammeh-Sidibe =

Gambian women's rights activist

Aja Binta Jammeh-Sidib
- Born: C. 1950s Banjul, the Gambia
- Education: Indiana University
- Occupations: Women's Right Activist; Public Servant
- Employer(s): United States Embassy in Banjul; United States Agency for International Development (USAID); The Gambian Women's Bureau
- Organization(s): Association for Promoting Girls and Women's Advancement (APGWA); Sobeya Skills Training Centre
- Known for: Campaigning against female genital mutilation promoting kafoolu women's empowerment and health advocacy
- Notable work: Founder of APGWA; Sobeya Skills Training Centre; Advocacy for 2015 amendment criminalizing FGM in The Gambia; Chairperson of National Local Organizing Committee for OIC Summit (2020–2024)
- Title: Executive Director, The Gambian Women's Bureau (former); Chairperson, National Local Organizing Committee for OIC Summit (2020–2024)
- Awards: Vanguard African Achievers Award (2020)

Aja Binta Jammeh-Sidibe (born c. 1950s) is a women's rights activist from the Gambia. Jammeh-Sidibe is notable as a campaigner against female genital mutilation and as a champion for women's economic and physical health through her non-profit, Association for Promoting Girls and Women's Advancement (APGWA).

== Biography ==
=== Early life and career ===
Aja Binta Jammeh was born in Banjul to parents Natoma Marong Jammeh and Alhagie Karamo Jammeh. Her family came from the Illiassa village in the Kerewan LGA of the Lower Baddibu District. As a student, Binta Jammeh stood out academically, receiving the highest mark in her primary school and the third highest marks nationally. From 1967 to 1974 Binta Jammeh attended Gambia Senior Secondary school, where her marks were in the top third of all students, and where she received a government scholarship to study abroad.

In 1975, she travelled to the United States to conduct undergraduate studies at Indiana University where she majored in African history with a minor in sociology. She graduated in 1978 and returned to the Gambia.

Upon returning to the Gambia, Binta Jammeh worked for the United States Embassy in Banjul and later as a training officer for the United States Agency for International Development. She would work for USAID until 1988. In 1987, she was first nominated as a member of the National Women's Council, from where she would begin becoming known for her work on women's rights.

=== Women's empowerment ===
In her work, Jammeh-Sidibe is notable for advocating against female genital mutilation, violence against women, and for promoting women's empowerment through skill development. In 1992, Jammeh-Sidibe founded the Association for Promoting Girls and Women's Advancement (APGWA), a non-profit organization dedicated to eliminating the gender gap in the Gambia. The organization supports women and girls in developing income-generating ventures, providing micro-financing and by providing resources for nursery school education. Alongside APGWA, Jammeh-Sidibe developed the Sobeya Skills Training Centre, an organisation that teaches women and girls practical skills allowing them to advance in the workplace.

Jammeh-Sidibe has promoted the Gambian practice of kafoolu to support women's empowerment. In the Gambia, kafoolu refers to the practice of developing collective organisations to advocate for specific objectives. Women's rights organisations in the country have successfully used the practice to enact political and social change.

She later became the executive director of The Gambian Women's Bureau. In this role, she worked with the Gambia's Ministry of Justice to create an amendment to the 2010 Women Act that would criminalize female genital mutilation in the country. The amendment was passed by parliament 2015. In 2024, an effort to repeal the bill was denied by the Gambian parliament. After retiring from her government position in 2019, Jammeh-Sidibe continues to advocate for women's health and empowerment through the Association for Promoting Girls and Women's Advancement (APGWA) and the Sobeya Skills training center, where she serves as executive director.

=== Later career and activism ===
On 1 February 2020, the Gambian Organisation of Islamic Cooperation Secretariat Board of Governors appointed Jammeh Sidibe as the Chairperson of the National Local Organizing Committee for the 15th Islamic Summit of the Organisation of Islamic Cooperation to be held in Banjul in 2022. The event would eventually be held in 2024.

In 2020, she was awarded a Vanguard African Achievers Award for her work supporting women's rights in the Gambia.

In 2024, she called on women in the Gambia to take a more active role in supporting women running for political positions, and to be brave about supporting women in politics in the country.

== Publications ==
- Binta Jammeh Sidibeh and Saim M. L. Kinteh. A Study on the Traditional Roles of Men and Women in a Gambian Society and how They Affect the Society. Economic Status of Women, Gambia National Women's Council & Bureau, 1990.

== See also ==
- Female genital mutilation in the Gambia
