= Boubacar Biro Diallo =

Guinean politician (1922–2025)

President of the National Assembly of Guinea
- In office 1995–2002
- Preceded by: Léon Maka
- Succeeded by: Aboubacar Somparé

Personal details
- Born: 1 January 1922 Mamou, French Guinea, French West Africa
- Died: 8 February 2025 (aged 103) Mamou, Guinea
- Political party: PUP
- Education: École normale supérieure William Ponty
- Occupation: Teacher

Boubacar Biro Diallo (1 January 1922 – 8 February 2025) was a Guinean politician of the Unity and Progress Party (PUP).

== Life and career ==
Born in Mamou on 1 January 1922, Diallo grew up in an upper-class family during the French colonial period. He attended a madrasa until joining a white school in 1932. He then attended secondary school in Conakry before studying at the École normale supérieure William Ponty and working as a teacher in Sébikhotane, Senegal. He was an early activist for the independence of Guinea and began his participation in political struggle. In 1990, former President Lansana Conté invited him to be a co-founder of PUP, of which he served as secretary-general. From 1995 to 2002, he was President of the National Assembly until his replacement by Aboubacar Somparé.

He was accredited Ambassador of Mali to Senegal on August 26, 2024

Diallo died in Mamou on 8 February 2025, at the age of 103.
