= Binta Mamman =

Politician from Nigeria

- Born: Gurara, Nigeria
- Citizenship: Nigerian
- Education: BSc Business Administration
- Occupation: Politician
- Title: member representing Gurara
- Political party: APC

Binta Mamman is a female politician from Niger State, Nigeria. She is a Business Administration graduate. Prior to her venturing into politics she was a house wife.

Mamman started her politics with the Peoples Democratic Party (PDP) in 2015, where she got elected as a member representing Gurara, constituency in the Niger State House of Assembly, and she got reelected in 2019 under the APC.

Mamman is currently the only Female member in the Niger State House of Assembly representing Gurara constituency under the All Progressives Congress (APC). She is the chairperson Niger State House of Assembly committee on Gender Affairs and Social Development. She was elected as the first female leader of the NSHA.

In 2017, she was awarded as the icon of community development in Niger State by the International Federation of Environmental and in 2021, she sponsored a bill on Gender Based Violence tagged the Niger State Violence Against Persons (Prohibition) law which will curb the increasing cases of Gender Based Violence in the state. She also moved a motion for death penalty for Rapists in 2020.
