= Binta Ann =

- Born: 1975 (age 50–51); Guinea
- Occupations: Author, activist for women's rights
- Notable work: Awa the Little Beggar
- Awards: Franco-German Prize for Human Rights (2017), Woman of the Year Award in the social and humanitarian category in Guinea (2018)

Binta Ann (born 1975) is a Guinean author and activist for women's rights and children's rights.

She received the Franco-German Prize for Human Rights in 2017 and the Woman of the Year Award in the social and humanitarian category in Guinea in 2018.

== Biography ==
=== Early life and education ===
Binta Ann was born in Guinea in 1975. She studied modern literature in her country before going to France, where she studied tourism. She then moved to the United States, where she earned a master's degree in preschool education and elementary education in New Jersey.

=== Career ===
In New Jersey, she taught at an American school.

After returning to Guinea, she taught successively at the American International School of Conakry and the Lycée Français Albert-Camus. She worked at the United States Agency for International Development (USAID), in the democracy and governance department.

She is a teacher at the lycée in Conakry.

== Literary work ==
In 1998, she published her novel Awa the Little Beggar, which was later adapted into a film by UNICEF, followed by Marriage by Mail in 2004.

She addresses themes such as female genital mutilation, arranged marriage, and polygamy.

== Fonbale Foundation ==
Binta Ann founded the humanitarian foundation Fonbale in 2008. Created in the United States before being recognized in Guinea in 2011, Binta Ann's Fonbale foundation works for the well-being of underprivileged women and children. Extending her activism through writing, she has authored several books addressing the well-being and defense of vulnerable people.

== Publications ==
- Awa the Little Beggar, 1998.
- Fatima Asks Questions. Illustrator: Georges Bonamer. les Classiques ivoiriens. 2016.
- Marriage by Mail. L'Harmattan. 2004. ISBN 2-7475-6496-7. OCLC 56064010.
- What Are Children's Rights, 2016.
- Why Do I Have to Go to School. Amadou Asks Questions, tome 1; CIV, 3018. Illustrator: Georges Bonamer. les Classiques ivoiriens. 2015. ISBN 978-2-37223-018-6.
- Why Do I Always Have to Wash My Hands. Amadou Asks Questions, tome 2; CIV, 3017. Illustrator: Georges Bonamer. les Classiques ivoiriens. 2015. ISBN 978-2-37223-017-9.
- What Are Children's Rights?. Fatima Asks Questions; CIV, 3039. Illustrator: Georges Bonamer. les Classiques ivoiriens. 2016. ISBN 978-2-37223-039-1.
- Hygiene Rules for Children, 2017.

== Awards and recognitions ==
- 2017: Franco-German Prize for Human Rights
- 2018: Gnouma Magazine Woman of the Year Award in the social and humanitarian category in Guinea

== Personal life ==
Binta Ann is married and has two children.

== Bibliography ==
- Iffono, Aly Gilbert (2020). Discovering Guinean Authors. Editions L'Harmattan. ISBN 978-2-14-014648-0. OCLC 1202466107.
