= Bintou Sanankoua =

Malian historian and politician

- Born: 1943 (age 82–83)
- Occupations: Historian, politician
- Notable work: Un empire peul au XIXe siècle: La Diina du Maasina

Bintou Sanankoua is a historian from Mali, who is Professor of History at the École Normale Supérieure de Bamako. She specialises in the history of Mali in the nineteenth and twentieth centuries. She has produced a study of the fall of the former president, Modibo Keita.

Brought up as part of the household that the author Amadou Hampâté Bâ was responsible for, Her close connection to the family meant that she was able to access family papers for her work Un empire peul au XIXe siècle: La Diina du Maasina, she also accessed archived held at the Ahmed Baba Centre in Timbuktu. In her work as a historian, she has expanded Bâ's own work on the life of the Dina people in the nineteenth century. She has also pioneered the study of the Caliphate of Ḥamdallāhi. She has worked on the Bayān mā waqaʿa - a text which describes the defeat of the Ḥamdallāhi.

First elected as a member of the National Assembly of Mali in 1997, her candidacy was supported by Coordination des Associations et ONG Féminines du Mali (CAFO). She has also held the role of Regional Coordinator for the Promotion of Women in Mopti. She is a member of the Collectif des Femmes du Mali (Women’s Collective of Mali) [COFEM].

== Selected publications ==
- Sanankoua, Bintou. Un empire peul au XIXe siècle: La Diina du Maasina. KARTHALA Editions, 1990.
- Sanankoua, Bintou. "Femmes et parlement au Mali." Afrique Contemporaine 210.2 (2004): 145-156.
- Sanankoua, Diarah Bintou. "Les écoles “Coraniques” au Mali: problèmes actuels." Revue Canadienne des Études Africaines 19.2 (1985): 359-367.
- Sanankoua, Bintou. "Amadou Hampate Ba: A Testimony." Islamic Africa 1.2 (2010): 143-166.
