= Binta Dada =

- Born: Binta Dada c. 1922; Katsina, Nigeria
- Died: 2 September 2024; Katsina State
- Other name: Hajiya Dada Yar'adua
- Known for: Matriarch of the Yar'adua family
- Children: Umaru Musa Yar'Adua

Binta Dada (c. 1922 – 2 September 2024), also known as Hajiya Fatima (Dada) Yar’adua. was a Nigerian matriarch and a prominent member of the Yar'adua family from katsina State, Nigeria. She was the mother of former President of Nigeria Umaru Musa Yar'Adua.

== Early life ==
Fatima was born on 31 January 1922 in Katsina state, Nigeria).

She was born into a prominent Katsina family and later became part of the influential Yar'adua family through marriage to Musa Yar'Adua, a Nigerian politician and traditional titleholder.

== Family ==
She was part of the Yar’adua family, a notable political family in Nigeria. Her son, Umaru Musa Yar'Adua, served as the President of Nigeria from 2007 until 2010.

== Public life ==
Although she never held public office, she was widely regarded as a respected matriarch and community elder, and was often noted in national discussions because of her family's political standing.

== Death ==
Hajiya died on 2 September 2024 in Katsina State, Nigeria, at the age of over 102, Her death was widely reported in Nigerian media.

== Legacy ==
She is remembered for her role in the Yar'adua family and her influence as the mother of a former Nigerian president.
