= Fatouma Bintou Djibo =

Burkinabé diplomat

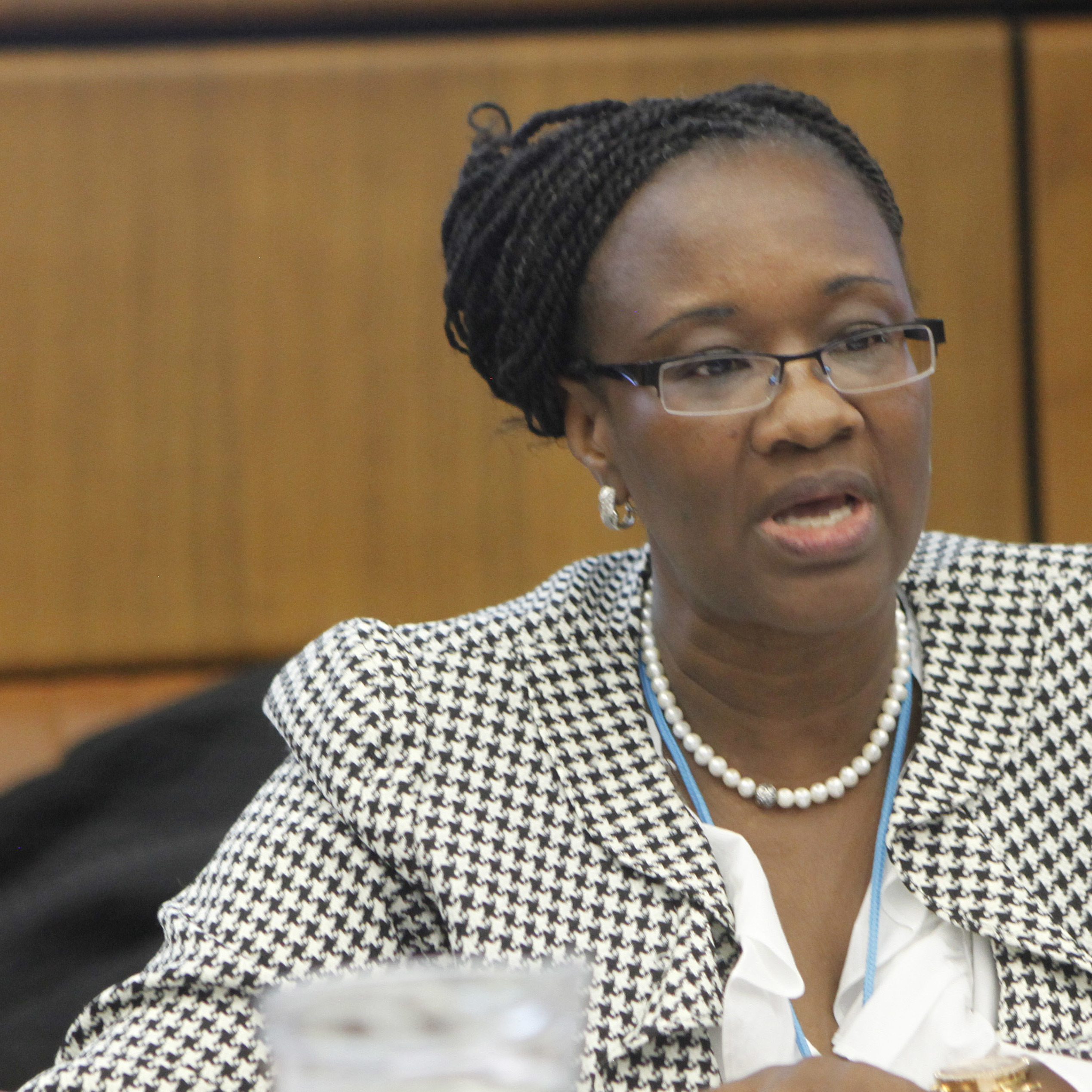
- in 2014
- Occupation: Diplomat
- Employer: United Nations

Fatouma Bintou Djibo, also Fatoumata, is a Burkinabé Resident Coordinator of the United Nations in Niger. She is the Resident Representative of the UNDP (now called the United Nations Sustainable Development Group). She is appointed by the Secretary-General of the United Nations.

== Life ==
She attended Sorbonne University and Paris's Institute of Demography where she studied spatial planning and demography where she received both an undergraduate and later a Master's degree. She spent some years working as a diplomat and she also attended further training at Georgetown University in Washington D.C.

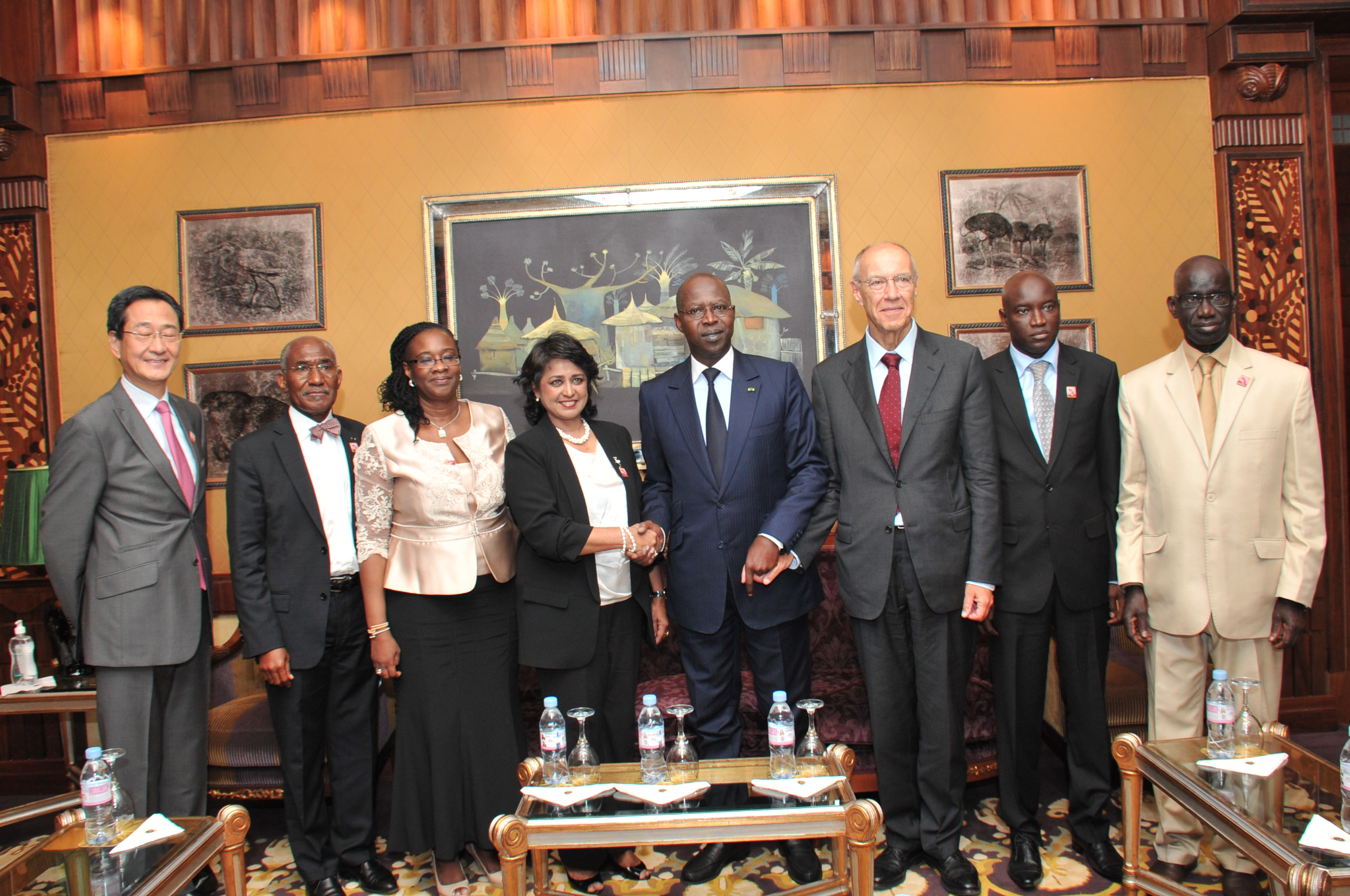
Senegal's Prime Minister welcomes High Level Participants to Ministerial Conference on IP in Dakar

She presented her credentials as the Secretary-General of the United Nations's representative to the Minister of Foreign Affairs for Niger, Ibrahim Yacouba, on October 6, 2017.

At a press conference in October 2019, Bintou Djibo explained that a delegation from the UN Peacebuilding Fund had come to Niger in order to investigate the funding made in connection with peacebuilding projects aimed at creating social cohesion between communities. This had led to the development of advice and guidance in regard to funding opportunities.
