= Bintou Malloum =

Chadian politician (1946–2020)

- Born: 31 March 1946; Torror, Salamat Region, French Chad
- Died: 10 March 2020 (aged 73); N'Djamena, Chad
- Occupation: Politician

Bintou Malloum (31 March 1946 – 10 March 2020) was a Chadian politician and the first ambassador of Chad to Germany, the Republic of Congo, and Italy.

== Biography ==
Malloum was born on 31 March 1946, in Torror, French Chad. Between 1993 and 2003, she served as Secretary of State, Secretary of Public Function, and Secretary of Labor. She also served three times as Minister of Social Affairs and Family. In 1997, Malloum was the first female student at the Ecole Nationale d'Administration et de Magistrature in N'Djamena and the first Chadian woman to become an ambassador.

Despite serving in several administrations considered corrupt, Malloum was regarded as a person of integrity. In February 2012, Malloum represented the Rotary Club of Chad. She died on 10 March 2020, in N'Djamena, Chad, and was buried in the Lamadji Cemetery. The President of Chad, Idriss Déby, sent condolences.

== Works ==
- Le destin d’une pionnière (2017)
