= Saifoulaye Diallo =

Guinean politician

- Diallo in 1959

Minister of Foreign Affairs
- In office May 1969 – June 1972
- President: Ahmed Sékou Touré
- Preceded by: Louis Lansana Béavogui
- Succeeded by: Fily Cissoko

Personal details
- Born: July 1, 1923 Diari, French Guinea
- Died: September 25, 1981 (aged 58) Conakry, Guinea
- Party: PDG-RDA

Saifoulaye Diallo (1 July 1923 – 25 September 1981) was a Guinean politician, lawmaker and cabinet member.

== Career ==
Diallo was educated at the École normale supérieure William Ponty in Dakar. While working as a civil servant in French West Africa, he was also a trade union activist, causing him to frequently move. As a member of the African Democratic Rally (RDA), he served in the National Assembly of France from 1956 to 1958.

In the 1957 Guinean Territorial Assembly election, Diallo was elected to and served as the first president of the assembly. After Guinea became independent in 1958, he continued as president of the country's National Assembly until 1963. Diallo was the political secretary of the ruling Democratic Party of Guinea – African Democratic Rally (PDG-RDA) and, after President Ahmed Sékou Touré, the de facto number-two statesman during the first five years of the Republic of Guinea. In January 1963 he entered the government, where he would serve as Minister of State, at various points responsible for finance and planning.

In May 1969, Diallo replaced Louis Lansana Béavogui as Minister of Foreign Affairs. After leaving the position as Minister of Foreign Affairs for health reasons in June 1972, he held the largely ceremonial post of Minister to the Presidency until 1976.

== Honours and awards ==
=== Foreign honours ===
- (Czechoslovakia) Grand Cross of the Order of the White Lion (1959)
- (West Germany) Grand Cross of the Order of Merit of the Federal Republic of Germany (1959)
- (Soviet Union) Jubilee Medal "In Commemoration of the 100th Anniversary of the Birth of Vladimir Ilyich Lenin" (1971)

== Books and speeches ==
- Saifoulaye Diallo. Rapport social : présenté le 27 septembre 1967 au 8e Congrès du P.D.G. Parti démocratique de Guinée. Conakry, Impr. Patrice Lumumba, 1967.
- Hommage à Elhadj Saifoulaye Diallo. Parti-Etat de Guinée. Conakry : Impr. Patrice Lumumba, 1981.
- Saifoulaye Diallo. Exposé sur le domaine financier. Parti démocratique de Guinée. Bureau politique national.; Ecole nationale des cadres du parti. Conakry, s.n., 1968
- Réformes de la constitution : différents discours. Saifoulaye Diallo; Charles de Gaulle; Ahmed Sékou Touré. Conakry. Bureau de presse de la Présidence de la République populaire révolutionnaire de Guinée, 1981.
- Discours. Jean Mauberna, Saifoulaye Diallo, Sékou Touré. Conakry, Impr. du gouvernement. Guinée française. Conakry, 1958
- Sidiki Kobélé Keita. Un homme de conviction et de foi : Saïfoulaye Diallo (1923-1981). Conakry : SKK, 2003.

Preceded by Louis Lansana Beavogui	Foreign Minister of Guinea; 1969-1972	Succeeded by Fily Cissoko
