= Dansa Kourouma =

Guinean politician

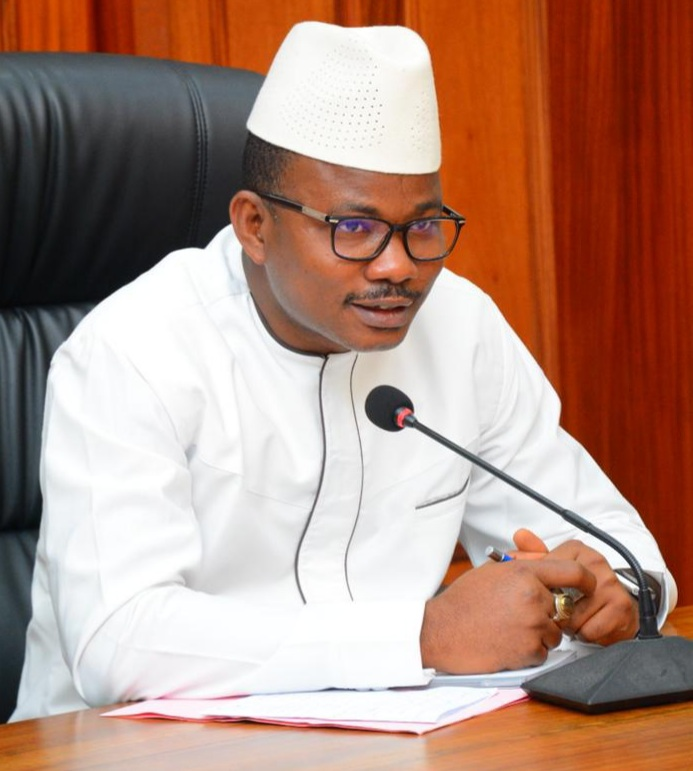

Personal details
- Born: Dansa Kourouma Faranah

Dansa Kourouma (born February 9, 1980, in Faranah) is a Guinean politician and has been president of the National Council of the Transition since 22 January 2022.

Following the 2021 Guinean coup d'état, the council was made the acting legislative body of the Republic of Guinea.

== See also ==
- Sény Camara
