= National Council of the Transition =

Guinean governmental body

National Council of the Transition Conseil National de la Transition
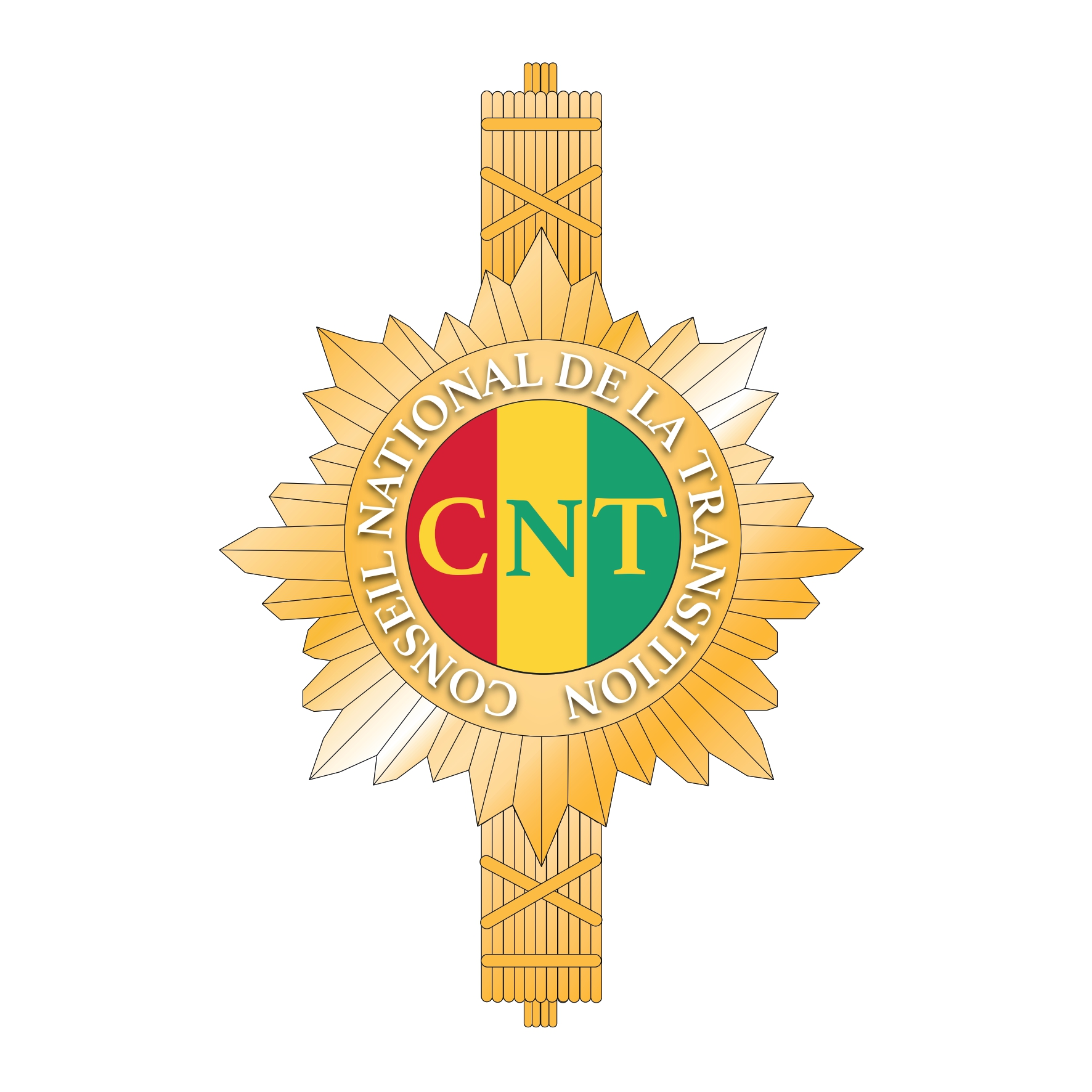
- Logo of the National Council of the Transition.

Type
- Type: Unicameral

History
- Founded: 2021

Leadership
- President: Dansa Kourouma since 22 January 2022
- Vice President: Maimouna Yombouno since 22 January 2022
- Vice President: Sény Facinet Sylla since 22 January 2022

Structure
- Seats: 81 national councilors

Meeting place
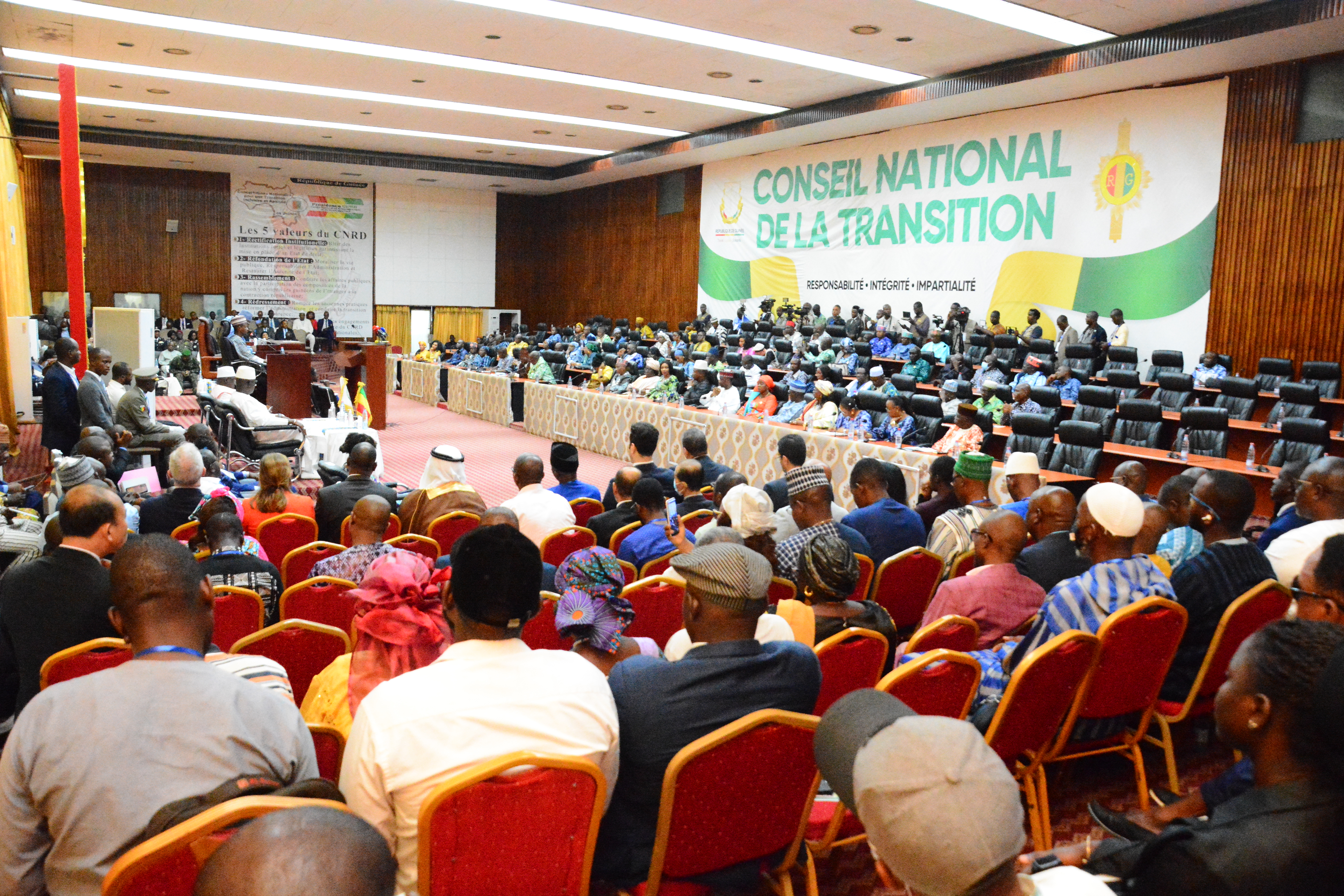
- Conakry

Website
- cnt.gov.gn

The National Council of the Transition (French: Conseil national de la transition) is the acting legislative body of the Republic of Guinea.

Following the 2021 Guinean coup d'état, it replaced the National Assembly during the transition period set up by the National Committee of Reconciliation and Development.

It has 81 members.

The members come from political parties, civil society, trade unions, the defense and security forces, human rights organizations, organizations of Guineans abroad, women's organizations, youth organizations, agricultural organizations, religious denominations, informal sectors and trades, farmers' organizations, professional organizations, consular chambers, press organizations, and others.

The council's president is Dansa Kourouma. The vice-presidents are Maimouna Yombouno and Elhad Facinet Seny Sylla. The parliamentary secretaries are Yamoussa Sidibe, Mory Dounoh, Maimouna Barry, and Fanta Conte.
