= List of hospitals in Guinea =

This is a list of hospitals in Guinea. In 2019, there were 1,746 medical facilities in Guinea, including 35 public hospitals at the national, regional, and prefecture level.

== Hospitals ==
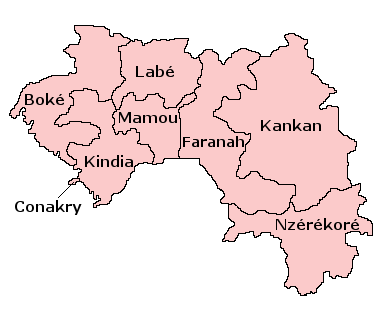

The following is a list of hospitals that includes the location and type hospital. A link to a map showing these hospitals is at the bottom of the table.

Hospitals in Guinea
Name	Region	Type Hospital	Coordinates	Ref
Beyla Prefecture Hospital	Nzérékoré Region	Prefecture	8.69749867735°N 8.64814602541°W	
Boké Regional Hospital	Boké Region	Regional	10.93872732°N 14.2939773166°W	
Clinique Ambroise Paré	Conakry	Clinic	9.527925°N 13.688356°W	
Coyah Prefecture Hospital	Kindia Region	Prefecture	9.71387024745°N 13.3915023155°W	
Dabola Prefecture Hospital	Faranah Region	Prefecture	10.7390008664°N 11.106411539°W	
Dalaba Prefecture Hospital	Mamou Region	Prefecture	10.6994992241°N 12.2477343717°W	
Dinguiraye Prefecture Hospital	Faranah Region	Prefecture	11.2970618517°N 10.7177941366°W	
Donka National Hospital	Conakry	National	9.54321613325°N 13.6821981015°W	
Faranah Regional Hospital	Faranah Region	Regional	10.0490860521°N 10.7398473783°W	
Forécariah Prefecture Hospital	Kindia Region	Prefecture	9.43678953117°N 13.0798374748°W	
Fria Prefecture Hospital	Kindia Region	Prefecture	10.3727542313°N 13.5816914754°W	
Gaoual Prefecture Hospital	Boké Region	Prefecture	11.7693465718°N 13.1997068378°W	
Gueckedou Prefecture Hospital	Nzérékoré Region	Prefecture	8.56842949499°N 10.13135839°W	
Boffa Prefecture Hospital	Boké Region	Prefecture	10.1857293493°N 14.0302699733°W	
Ignace Deen National Hospital	Conakry	National	9.5140886399°N 13.7087359683°W	
Dubréka Prefecture Hospital	Kindia Region	Prefecture	9.79181560048°N 13.5151326654°W	
Kankan Regional Hospital	Kankan Region	Regional	10.3892427072°N 9.30794417836°W	
Kindia Regional Hospital	Kindia Region	Regional	10.0719602617°N 12.8495973668°W	
Kipe National Hospital	Conakry	National	9.60576509602°N 13.6470696702°W	
Kissidougou Prefecture Hospital	Faranah Region	Prefecture	9.19877989633°N 10.0964632807°W	
Koubia Prefecture Hospital	Kankan Region	Prefecture	11.4453708199°N 12.0460764237°W	
Kouroussa Prefecture Hospital	Kankan Region	Prefecture	10.6590176413°N 9.88062372135°W	
Kérouané Prefecture Hospital	Kankan Region	Prefecture	9.27745846136°N 9.00713622695°W	
Labé Regional Hospital	Labé Region	Regional	11.3256835872°N 12.2839525371°W	
Lola Prefecture Hospital	Nzérékoré Region	Prefecture	7.80696224297°N 8.53042183756°W	
LTlouma Prefecture Hospital	Labé Region	Prefecture	11.4376751708°N 12.6834914483°W	
Macenta Prefecture Hospital	Nzérékoré Region	Prefecture	8.55238433079°N 9.46779499117°W	
Mali Prefecture Hospital	Labé Region	Prefecture	12.0787157145°N 12.2958499001°W	
Mamou Regional Hospital	Mamou Region	Regional	10.3810804659°N 12.0814751444°W	
Mandiana Prefecture Hospital	Kankan Region	Prefecture	10.624350633°N 8.69825589858°W	
Nzérékoré Regional Hospital	Nzérékoré Region	Regional	7.75599479611°N 8.82191720429°W	
Pita Prefecture Hospital	Mamou Region	Prefecture	11.0716492457°N 12.395047873°W	
Siguiri Prefecture Hospital	Kankan Region	Prefecture	11.4261473401°N 9.17408466576°W	
Tougue Prefecture Hospital	Labé Region	Prefecture	11.4468992881°N 11.6631825789°W	
Télimélé Prefecture Hospital	Kindia Region	Prefecture	10.9096670424°N 13.0323092555°W	
Yomou Prefecture Hospital	Nzérékoré Region	Prefecture	7.57255750946°N 9.26110581047°W	
