= Bouramayah =

Village in Dubréka Prefecture, Guinea

- Village
- Interactive map of Bouramayah
- Coordinates: 10°28′5.47″N 13°29′2.01″W
- Country: Guinea
- Region: Kindia Region
- Prefecture: Dubréka
- Sub-prefecture: Tanéné

Bouramayah (Bouramaya) is a village in the Tanéné sub-prefecture, Dubréka Prefecture of Guinea. It is the home village of the family of the former Guinean president General Lansana Conté.

== History ==
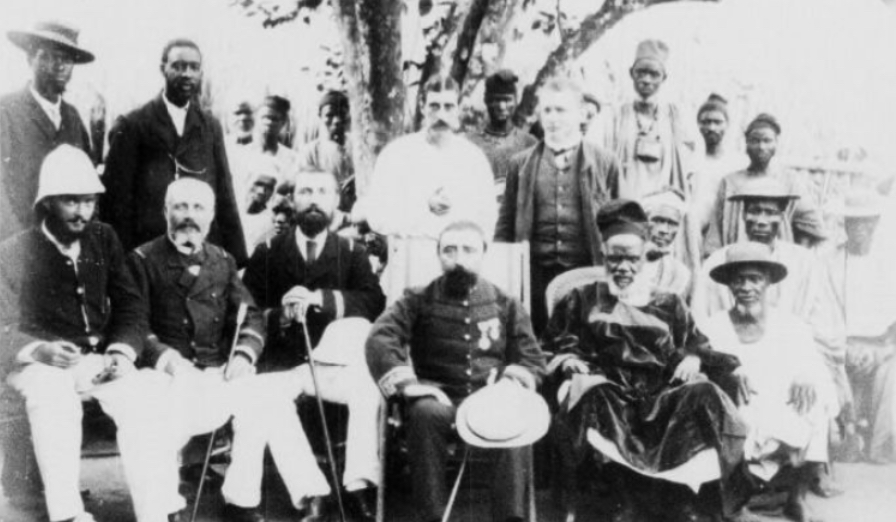
Jean-Marie Bayol and William Fernandez in Bouramayah

The town became the seat of power of the Fernandez Dynasty from the 1780s. In 1885 King William Fernandez received Jean-Marie Bayol, the French lieutenant-governor of Senegal, in charge of the Rivières du Sud region, on an official visit to the town.
