= AGP =

AGP may refer to:

== Biology and medicine ==
- Aerosol-generating procedure, in medicine or healthcare
- Ambulatory glucose profile, a standardized report for interpreting a person's daily glucose and insulin patterns
- Arabinogalactan protein, glycoproteins found in the cell walls of plants
- Orosomucoid, or alpha-1 acid glycoprotein

== Companies and organisations ==
- Apax Globis Partners & Co., a former name of Globis Capital Partners, a joint Japan-U.S venture capital firm
- Asom Gana Parishad, a political party in Assam, India
- Associação Guias de Portugal, the national Guiding association of Portugal
- Guinean Press Agency (French: Agence Guinéenne de Presse)

== People ==
- Charles Marvin Green Jr., better known as Angry Grandpa (1950–2017), American Internet personality
- Alejandro García Padilla (born 1971), Puerto Rican politician
- A. George Pradel (c. 1938), mayor of Naperville, Illinois
- Arthur Guyon Purchas (1821-1906), Welsh-New Zealander clergyman

== Technology ==
- Accelerated Graphics Port, a high-speed point-to-point channel for attaching a graphics card to a computer's motherboard
- Advance Game Port, a third-party GameCube accessory

== Transport ==
- Australian Grand Prix, a car race
- Málaga Airport (IATA code), Spain
- A US Navy hull classification symbol: Motor torpedo boat tender (AGP)

== Other uses ==
- Rome General Peace Accords (Portuguese: Acordo Geral de Paz), a 1992 treaty ending Mozambique's civil war
- Autogynephilia, a disputed 1980s psychological typology of transfeminine people
- Artificial grass pitch, a sports pitch made from synthetic materials
- Paranan language, Philippines (former ISO 639-3 code: agp)
