= Sinta (disambiguation) =

Sinta is a town in Guinea.

Sinta may also refer to:

- "Sinta", a song by the Filipino boy band BGYO, from the 2026 EP On Demand
- Sinta, Cyprus, a village
- Sinta (name)
