= List of mosques in Guinea =

This is a list of mosques in Guinea.

Name	Image	Location	Year (CE)	Remarks
Grand Mosque of Conakry		Conakry	1982	
Mohammed VI Mosque		Conakry	2017	
Mosque of Dinguiraye		Dinguiraye	19th century	
Mosque of Kankan		Kankan		

== See also ==
- Islam in Guinea
- List of mosques in Africa
