= ISIC of Kountia =

- Institut supérieur de l'information et de la communication de Kountia
- Type: Public Institution
- Established: 2004
- Director: Pr Djénabou Barry
- Students: 800
- Location: Coyah, Guinea
- Language: French

The Higher Institute of Information and Communication of Kountia (ISIC-Kountia) is a public higher education institution in Guinea that trains journalists and communicators. It is located in Kountia in the Coyah Prefecture.

Founded in 2006, it operates under the supervision of the Ministry of Higher Education and Scientific Research.

== Location ==
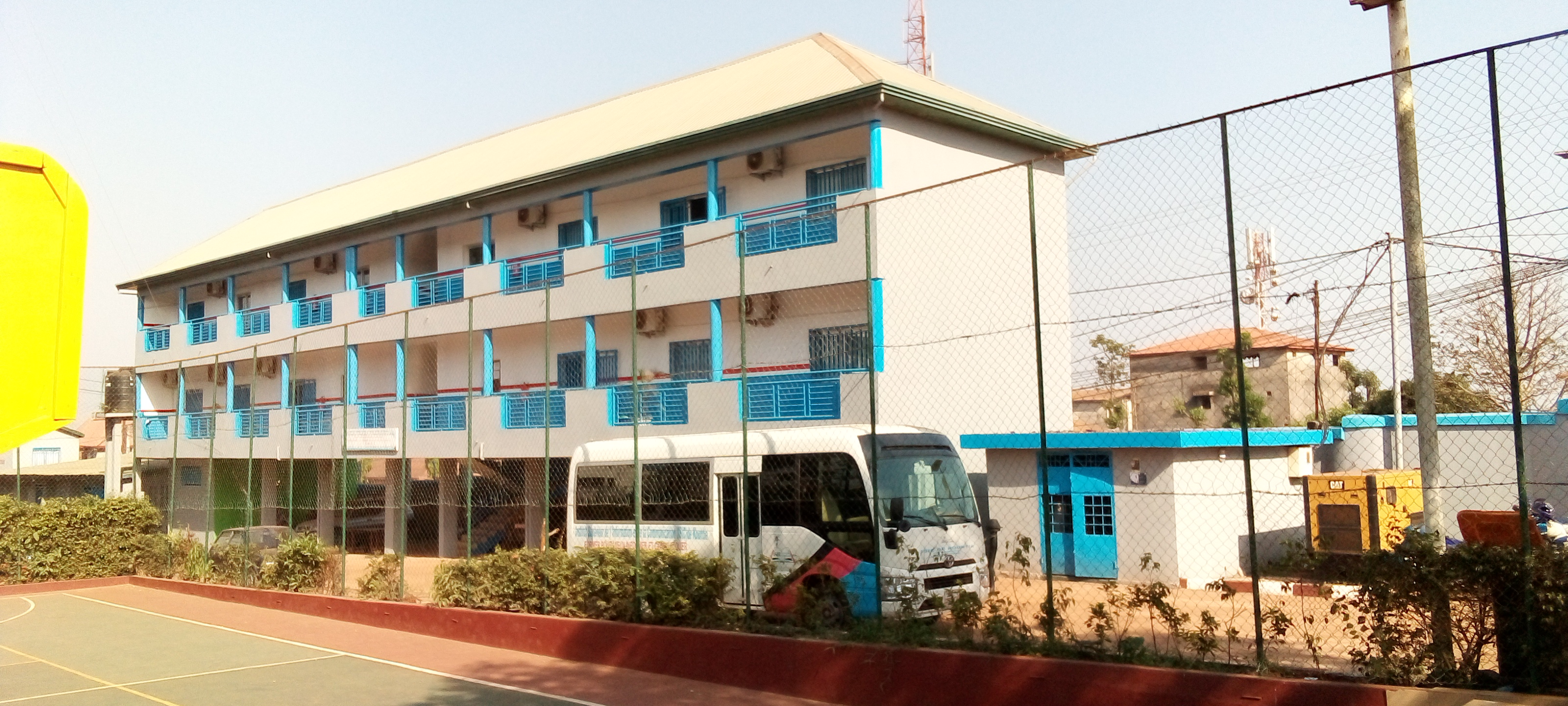
Institute of Information and Communication Science (ISIC Kountia)

ISIC is located in Kountia-Nord in the Coyah Prefecture.

== Programs ==
ISIC of Kountia offers two main programs:

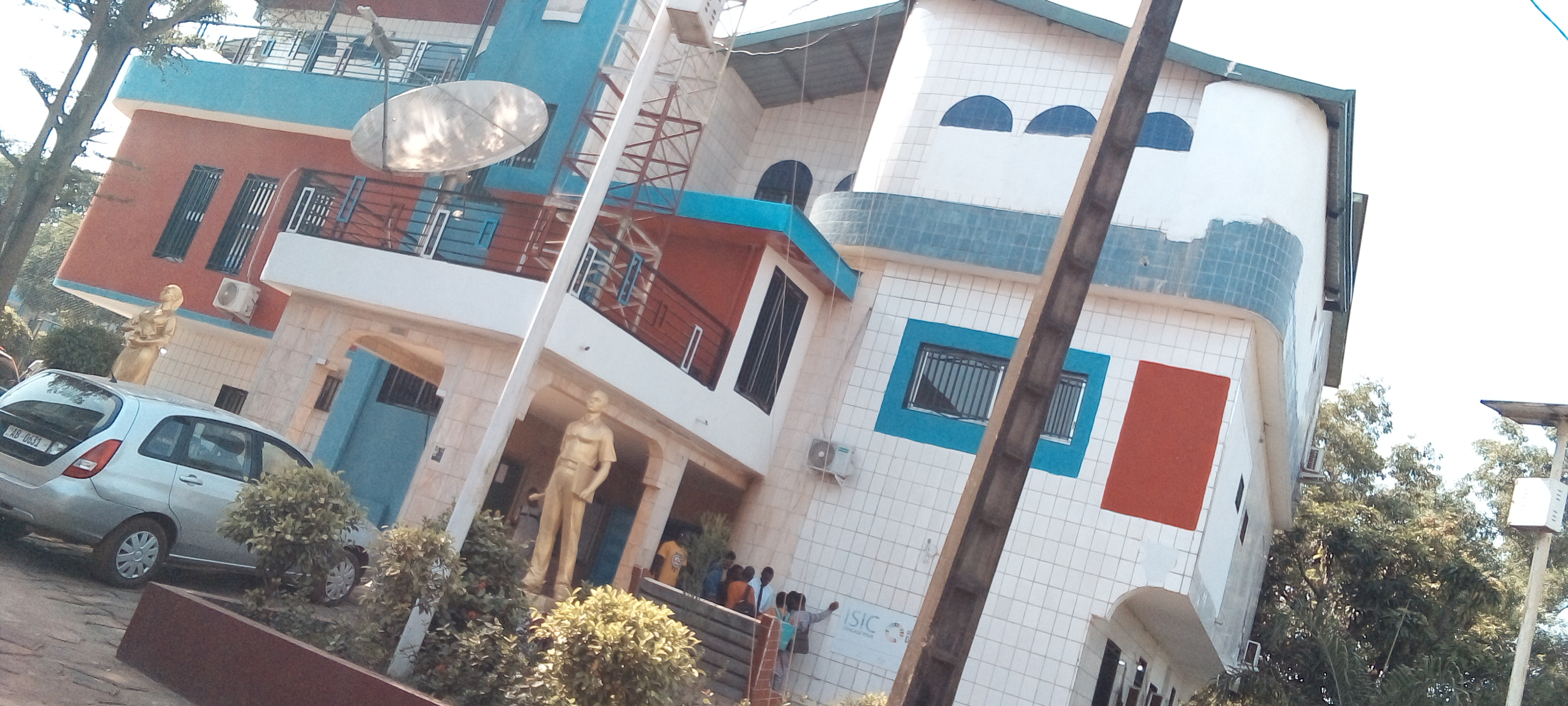
Main building of ISIC Kountia

=== Communication program ===
- Communication Studies: Social Communication and Corporate Communication

=== Journalism program ===
- Print Journalism
- Broadcast Journalism

=== Master programs ===
- Master's in Public Communication
- Master's in Political Communication

== Partnerships ==
ISIC of Kountia has established partnerships with institutions, radio stations, television channels, companies, and newspapers in Guinea and abroad, including ISIC Rabat, Hirondelle Guinea, Open Society Initiative for West Africa, Espace FM and TV, Djoma FM and TV.

== See also ==
- Institut supérieur de technologie de Mamou
- Institut supérieur des arts Mory Kanté
- Institut supérieur agronomique et vétérinaire Valéry Giscard d'Estaing
