= Forécariah =

- Sub-prefecture and town
- Location in Guinea
- Coordinates: 9°26′N 13°05′W
- Country: Guinea
- Region: Kindia Region
- Prefecture: Forécariah Prefecture

Government
  - Mayor: Elhadj Bady Touré
- Elevation: 256 ft (78 m)

Population (2008 est.)
  - Total: 21,710

Forécariah (N’ko: ߝߏߙߋߞߊߙߌߦߊ߫) is a sub-prefecture and town located in western Guinea. It is the capital of Forécariah Prefecture.

As of 2008, the population was estimated to be around 21,710.

== Famous people ==
It was the birthplace of Henri Duparc, the film director.

== Mining ==
Forecariah is a possible station on a heavy duty railway between Kalia mine and Matakong port for the export of iron ore. One of the mines is at Kalia.

== Ebola ==
Ismail Ould Cheikh Ahmed, head of United Nations Mission for Ebola Emergency Response (UMEER) visited Forécariah in March 2015, concerned about the continuing large number of cases of Ebola. He called for closer collaboration between health services in Guinea and neighbouring Sierra Leone. This was in the context of three quarters of all Ebola cases worldwide being in the combined areas of Forécariah Prefecture and neighbouring Kambia District in Sierra Leone.

== See also ==
- Railway stations in Guinea
