= Mohammed VI Mosque =

Mohammed VI Mosque may refer to:

- Mohammed VI Mosque (Abidjan), a mosque in Abidjan, Ivory Coast
- Mohammed VI Mosque (Coquimbo), a mosque in Coquimbo, Chile
- Mohammed VI Mosque (Conakry), a mosque in Conakry, Guinea
- Mohammed VI Mosque (Dar es Salaam), a grand mosque in Dar es Salaam, Tanzania
- Mohammed VI Mosque (N'Djamena), a mosque in N'Djamena, Chad
