= Ambroise Paré Hospital =

Ambroise Paré Hospital may refer to:

- Clinique Ambroise Paré, Conakry, Guinea
- Ambroise Paré Hospital (Boulogne-Billancourt), Paris, France
