= Kouriah =

- Sub-prefecture and town
- Location in Guinea
- Coordinates: 9°47′N 13°21′W
- Country: Guinea
- Region: Kindia Region
- Prefecture: Coyah Prefecture
- Time zone: UTC+0 (GMT)

Kouriah is a town and sub-prefecture in the Coyah Prefecture in the Kindia Region of western Guinea.
