= Tondon =

- Sub-prefecture and town
- Location in Guinea
- Coordinates: 10°22′N 13°21′W
- Country: Guinea
- Region: Kindia Region
- Prefecture: Dubreka Prefecture

Population (2008)
  - Total: 16,030

Tondon is a town in western Guinea. It is located in Dubreka Prefecture in the Kindia Region. Population 16,030 (2008 est). It lies about 180 kilometers from Conakry.
