= Badi, Guinea =

Badi
- Sub-prefecture and town
- Location in Guinea
- Coordinates: 10°21′N 13°28′W
- Country: Guinea
- Region: Kindia Region
- Prefecture: Dubréka Prefecture
- Time zone: UTC+0 (GMT)

Badi, Guinea is a town and sub-prefecture in the Dubréka Prefecture in the Kindia Region of western Guinea.
