= Koba, Kindia =

Koba
- Sub-prefecture and town
- Location in Guinea
- Coordinates: 11°14′N 13°21′W
- Country: Guinea
- Region: Kindia Region
- Prefecture: Télimélé Prefecture
- Time zone: UTC+0 (GMT)

Koba, Kindia is a town and sub-prefecture in the Télimélé Prefecture in the Kindia Region of western-central Guinea.
