= Kallia =

- Sub-prefecture and town
- Location in Guinea
- Coordinates: 9°13′N 13°16′W
- Country: Guinea
- Region: Kindia Region
- Prefecture: Forécariah Prefecture
- Time zone: UTC+0 (GMT)

Kallia is a town and sub-prefecture in the Forécariah Prefecture in the Kindia Region of western Guinea.
