= Kollet, Télimélé =

Kollet
- Sub-prefecture and town
- Location in Guinea
- Coordinates: 11°13′N 13°07′W
- Country: Guinea
- Region: Kindia Region
- Prefecture: Télimélé Prefecture
- Time zone: UTC+0 (GMT)

Kollet (locally, Koole) is a town and sub-prefecture in the Télimélé Prefecture in the Kindia Region of western-central Guinea.
