= Benty (disambiguation) =

Benty may refer to:

- Benty Grange helmet, a boar-crested Anglo-Saxon helmet
- Benty Grange, a Site of Special Scientific Interest in Derbyshire
- Benty, a town in western Guinea
