= Falessade =

- Sub-prefecture and town
- Location in Guinea
- Coordinates: 10°8′N 13°18′W
- Country: Guinea
- Region: Kindia Region
- Prefecture: Dubréka Prefecture
- Time zone: UTC+0 (GMT)

Falessade is a town and sub-prefecture in the Dubréka Prefecture in the Kindia Region of western Guinea.
