= Santou =

- Sub-prefecture and town
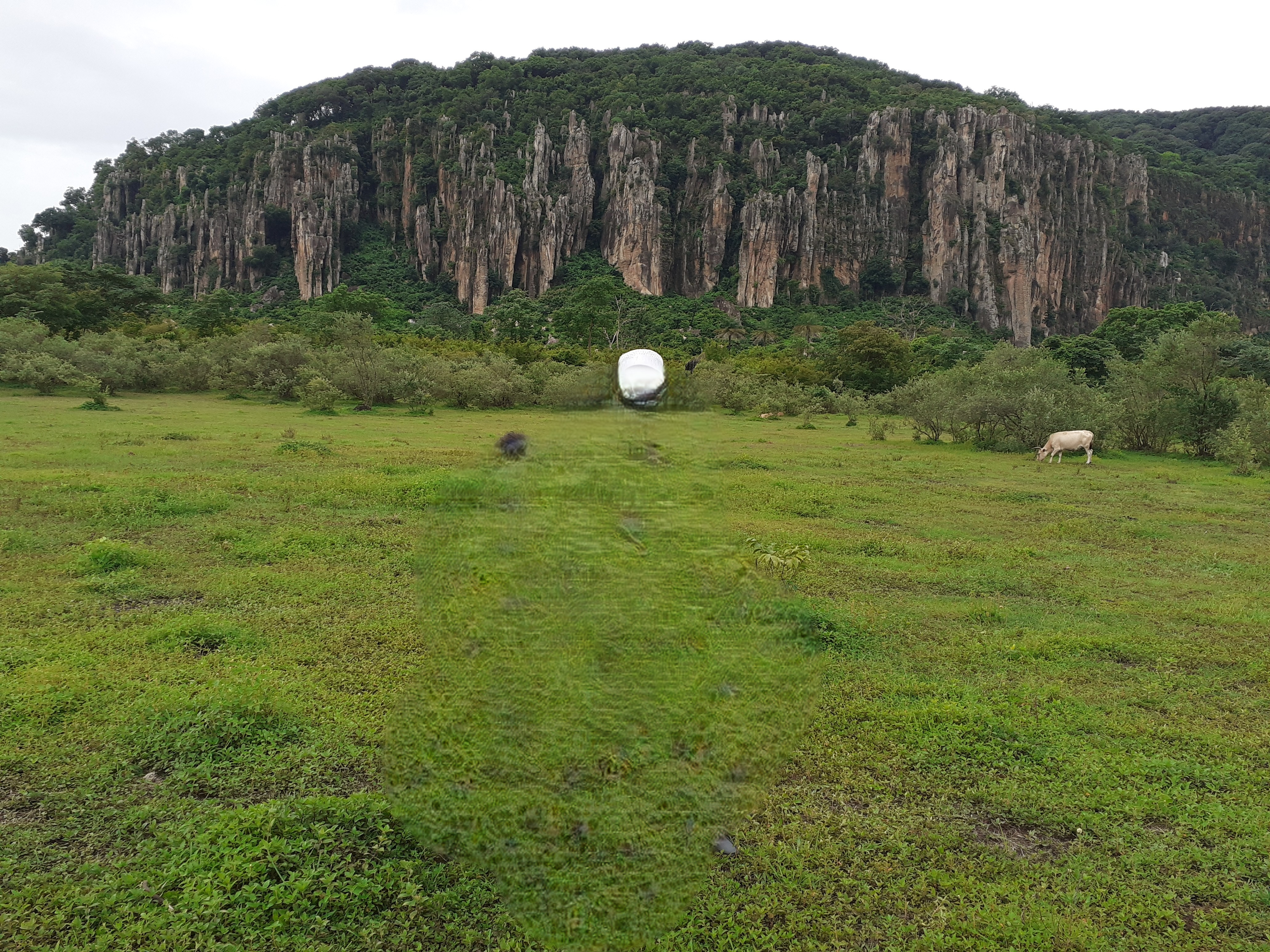

- Location in Guinea
- Coordinates: 11°08′N 13°05′W
- Country: Guinea
- Region: Kindia Region
- Prefecture: Télimélé Prefecture
- Time zone: UTC+0 (GMT)

Santou (locally, Santu) is a town and sub-prefecture in the Télimélé Prefecture in the Kindia Region of western-central Guinea.

== Mining ==
- Bauxite and iron ore are mined in this district.

== Transport ==
A standard gauge railway is under construction to connect these mines with the new port of Dapilon.
