= Abdoulaye Bernard Keita =

Guinean politician

Deputy in the National Assembly (Guinea)
- President: Alpha Conde
- Preceded by: Abou Camara
- Constituency: Coyah

Personal details
- Party: Rally of the Guinean People

Abdoulaye Bernard Keita is a Guinean politician who represents the constituency of Coyah Prefecture. He is a member of the Majority Rally of the Guinean People Party of former president Alpha Conde. He was formerly the questor in charge of finances.

In 2021, he warned those involved in the illegal sale of state-owned estates in the Coyah prefecture, in his capacity as the prefecture's single-member deputy.
