= Karim Bangoura =

Guinean politician (c. 1926–1972)

Karim Bangoura (c. 1926 – 1972) was a Guinean diplomat.

Born into a notable Susu family in Coyah in the mid-1920s, Bangoura was originally a school teacher and was an important member of the African Bloc of Guinea. Until 1958, he was a representative to the French Union.

A one-time director of the Guinean Press Agency, he served as Minister of Industry and Mines and from 1969 as Ambassador to the United States. He was arrested in Conakry in 1971 for participating in a 1970 attempted coup which was supported by the Portuguese, and was executed without trial a year later.
