= Mellacorée River =

Coordinates: 9°13′N 13°3′W

Location
- Country: Guinea

Physical characteristics
- Mouth
  - location: Atlantic Ocean

The Mellacorée River is a short river in Guinea. Most of its lower part is an estuary.

== History ==
The Mellacorée River was one of the "Southern Rivers," a territory gradually occupied by the French between 1860 and 1880 and placed under the authority of the governor of Senegal before becoming the colony of Guinea. A military outpost was established in 1866 in Benty, at the mouth of the river.
