= Missira =

Missira may refer to:

- Missira, Kindia in Guinea
- Missira, Labé in Guinea
