= Télimélé =

- Location in Guinea
- Coordinates: 10°54′N 13°02′W
- Country: Guinea
- Region: Kindia Region

Population (2008)
  - Total: 15,973

Télimélé is a town in the Fouta Djallon highlands of Guinea. Its population was estimated at 15,973 in 2008. It is the capital of Télimélé Prefecture.

== Guémé Sangan ==
Guémé Sangan was a fortress of Koli Tenguella located at Télimélé. On 20 February 1888, Almamy Sori and the Chiefs of the theocratic state of Fouta Jallon ceded Guémé Sangan and the territory of Koli Tengela's capital to the French negotiator Aimé Olivier de Sanderval. This was signed by Almamy Ibrahima Sori the son of Abdoul Gadiri and Thierno Ibrahima chief of the Province of Timbi Touni.

It has a district hospital with 44 beds.
