= Moussaya =

- Sub-prefecture and town
- Location in Guinea
- Coordinates: 9°28′N 12°51′W
- Country: Guinea
- Region: Kindia Region
- Prefecture: Forécariah Prefecture
- Elevation: 194 ft (59 m)
- Time zone: UTC+0 (GMT)

Moussaya is a town and sub-prefecture in the Forécariah Prefecture in the Kindia Region of western Guinea.

== Namesake ==
There are a number of other towns in Guinea with this name.

== Transport ==
The town in on the route of a proposed 500 km long heavy duty standard gauge railway taking iron ore to a new port at Matakong. This station is approximately 74 km from that port.

== See also ==
- Railway stations in Guinea
