= Clinique Ambroise Paré =

Ambroise Paré Hospital
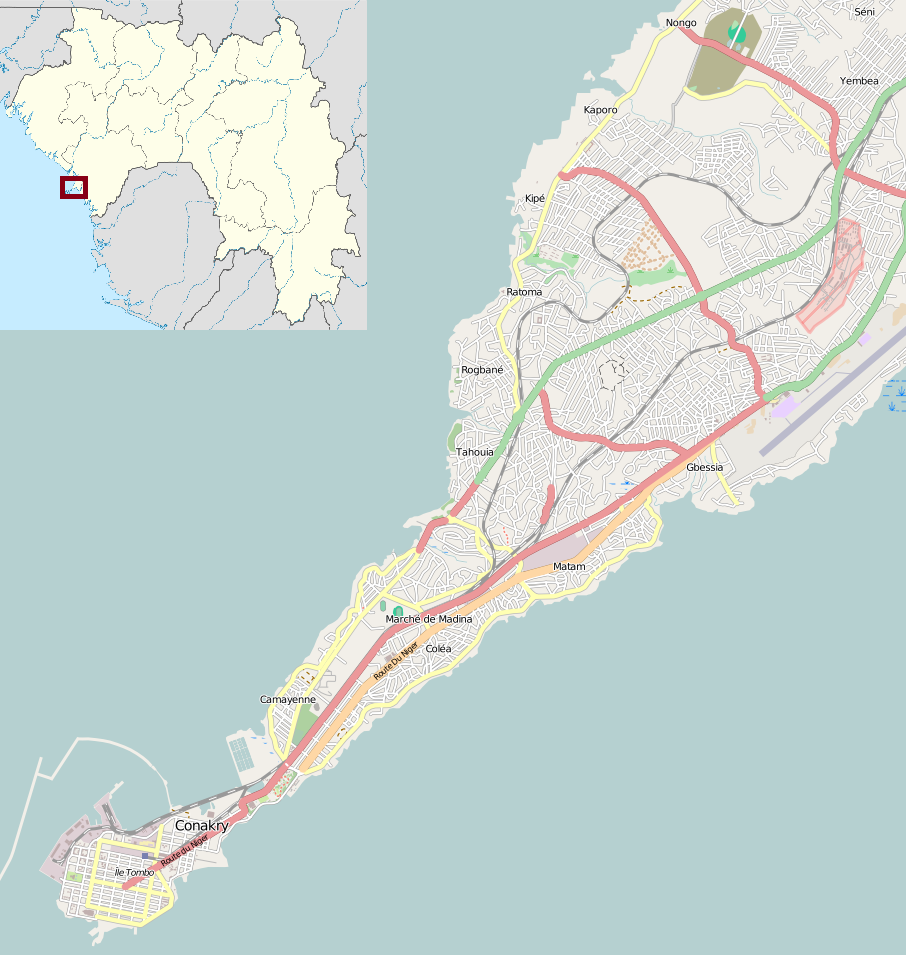
- The hospital's location in Conakry

Geography
- Location: Conakry, Guinea
- Coordinates: 9.5295°N 13.6902°W

Links
- Lists: Hospitals in Guinea

The Clinique Ambroise Paré, a hospital in Conakry, Guinea, is considered to be the best hospital in the country.

== Details ==
The hospital is named after Ambroise Paré, the father of French surgery. It is privately owned, providing better care than the government hospitals Ignace Deen and Donka but not as high a standard as in Europe or North America.

Ambroise Paré has an ambulance, and is equipped for surgery. It is located on North Corniche next to USAID, southwest of the Conakry Botanical Garden.

== History ==
In September 2009 a rally at a city stadium in protest against the military junta was violently broken up, with dozens of people being killed by security forces. Former prime ministers Cellou Dalein Diallo and Sidya Touré were injured, and taken to Ambroise Paré. However, soldiers removed them from the clinic and took them to the Alpha Yaya Diallo camp, the junta's headquarters.

== See also ==
- Health in Guinea
