= Khorira =

- Sub-prefecture and town
- Location in Guinea
- Coordinates: 9°52′N 13°29′W
- Country: Guinea
- Region: Kindia Region
- Prefecture: Dubréka Prefecture
- Time zone: UTC+0 (GMT)

Khorira is a town and sub-prefecture in the Dubréka Prefecture in the Kindia Region of western Guinea.
