= ISIC =

ISIC may refer to:

- International Space Innovation Centre, a facility of the UK Space Agency
- International Standard Industrial Classification, a United Nations industry classification system
- International Student Identity Card, an internationally accepted proof of student status
- Institute for the Study of Islam and Christianity, a nonprofit organization based in the United Kingdom
- ISIC of Kountia, a higher education institution in Guinea
