= Ambulatory glucose profile =

Report for interpreting a patient's daily glucose and insulin patterns

Ambulatory glucose profile (AGP) is a single-page, standardized report for interpreting a patient's daily glucose and insulin patterns. AGP provides both graphic and quantitative characterizations of daily glucose patterns. First developed by Drs. Roger Mazze and David Rodbard, with colleagues at the Albert Einstein College of Medicine in 1987, AGP was initially used for the representation of episodic self-monitored blood glucose (SMBG). The first version included a glucose median and inter-quartile ranges graphed as a 24-hour day. Dr. Mazze brought the original AGP to the International Diabetes Center (IDC) in the late 1980s. Since then, IDC has built the AGP into the internationally recognized standard for glucose pattern reporting.

CaptῡrAGP is a registered trademark of the International Diabetes Center. The AGP, as it is known in the diabetes community, now includes several additional sections: glucose statistics, glucose profile graph, and either daily glucose pattern calendar images or insulin dosage graphs.

== A transition to continuous glucose monitoring (CGM) ==
In 1988 the technology laboratory moved to the International Diabetes Center at Park Nicollet (IDC) in Minnesota. Memory-based reflectance meters with AGP analysis were used in all clinical research projects. AGP was extensively used to characterize abnormalities in pregnancy, type 1 diabetes, and type 2 diabetes. This led to a re-designation of the laboratory as: WHO Collaborating Center for Diabetes Education, Translation and Computer Technologies (a joint program of IDC and Mayo Clinic).

In 2004 continuous glucose monitoring (CGM) was introduced. A small sensor placed under the skin for three days (by 2013 up to 14 days) would measure glucose continuously and transmit the results to a receiver, which would periodically be connected to a PC to produce reports for the health care provider. Because CGM would overcome the episodic nature of SMBG, overnight glucose values, postprandial values and glucose levels during and after activity would be instantly available to the patient and later to the physician for analysis. For most systems, the patient had to calibrate the sensor by SMBG 2-4 times per day and the physician had to off load the data into proprietary non-standardized reports. Nevertheless, with the advent of CGM it was now possible to use AGP analysis to characterize diurnal patterns.

Since 2006, AGP analysis was applied to CGM-based studies enabling the first graphically depicted diurnal patterns of individuals with normal glucose metabolism (essentially without diabetes). ″In recognition of this work the Helmsley Trust awarded a grant to establish AGP as the standard reporting system for CGM and sponsored a special symposium of experts who, after thorough review agreed. Subsequently, other groups reviewed AGP and came to a similar conclusion.

== Introduction of flash glucose monitoring (FGM) ==
In 2013 Abbott Diabetes Care (ADC) became the first company to license the AGP report for use in its newly developed FreeStyle Libre FGM System. Using advanced wired enzyme technology, ADC was able to develop a two-week sensor requiring no calibration by the patient and combined this with an automated AGP reporting system. Shown here (figure to the right) are two AGPs produced by this system: normal glucose metabolism (top panel) and type 1 diabetes (bottom panel). Produced within seconds of uploading the Libre reader, the reports are meant to provide a basis for rapid clinical decisions that are diagnostic, interventional and evaluative. The AGP collapses the two weeks of glucose data and plots only by time allowing for underlying patterns to be identified. It uses five smoothed frequency curves to represent glucose exposure, variability and stability while simultaneously identifying periods of significant hypoglycemia and hyperglycemia.

== Building consensus ==
In February 2017, the Advanced Technology and Treatment for Diabetes Congress, an international body of scientists and clinicians interested in the application of technologies to diabetes care, convened experts from academic centers in research, clinical care and patient advocacy to form a consensus on utilization of continuous glucose monitoring in diabetes care and research. The results of the meeting were published in December 2017. The group, after reviewing various reports used to represent CGM data, concluded that "the AGP approach... is recommended by this consensus group as a standard for visualization of CGM data." In a joint statement of the European Association for the Study of Diabetes and the American Diabetes Association the authors pointed out that "The Ambulatory Glucose Profile (AGP) has been recommended as a potential universal software report that could be adopted to standardize summary metrics among devices and manufacturers." They went on to suggest that AGP measures, inter-quartile range (IQR) and area under the curve (AUC), are currently used to represent glucose variability and exposure, respectively.

In June 2017, at the American Diabetes Association Scientific Meetings in San Diego, CA a panel of experts representing all the major diabetes professional and patient organizations presented their thoughts and recommendations for an international standard for diabetes reporting. The standard suggested the use of 14 key elements to fully articulate the glucose patterns on any report.

AGP has been recognized as an international standard report for glucose patterns. The AGP report is available through IDC's licensing partners: Abbott Diabetes Care, Dexcom, Glooko + Diasend, and Roche. Current AGP reports are now available for self monitoring blood glucose and continuous glucose monitoring devices as well as insulin pumps (tradition and closed loop) and downloadable insulin pens and research. Further AGP report development is ongoing at IDC.
