= As-Salam Mosque =

Mosque in Santiago, Chile

- Mezquita As-Salam
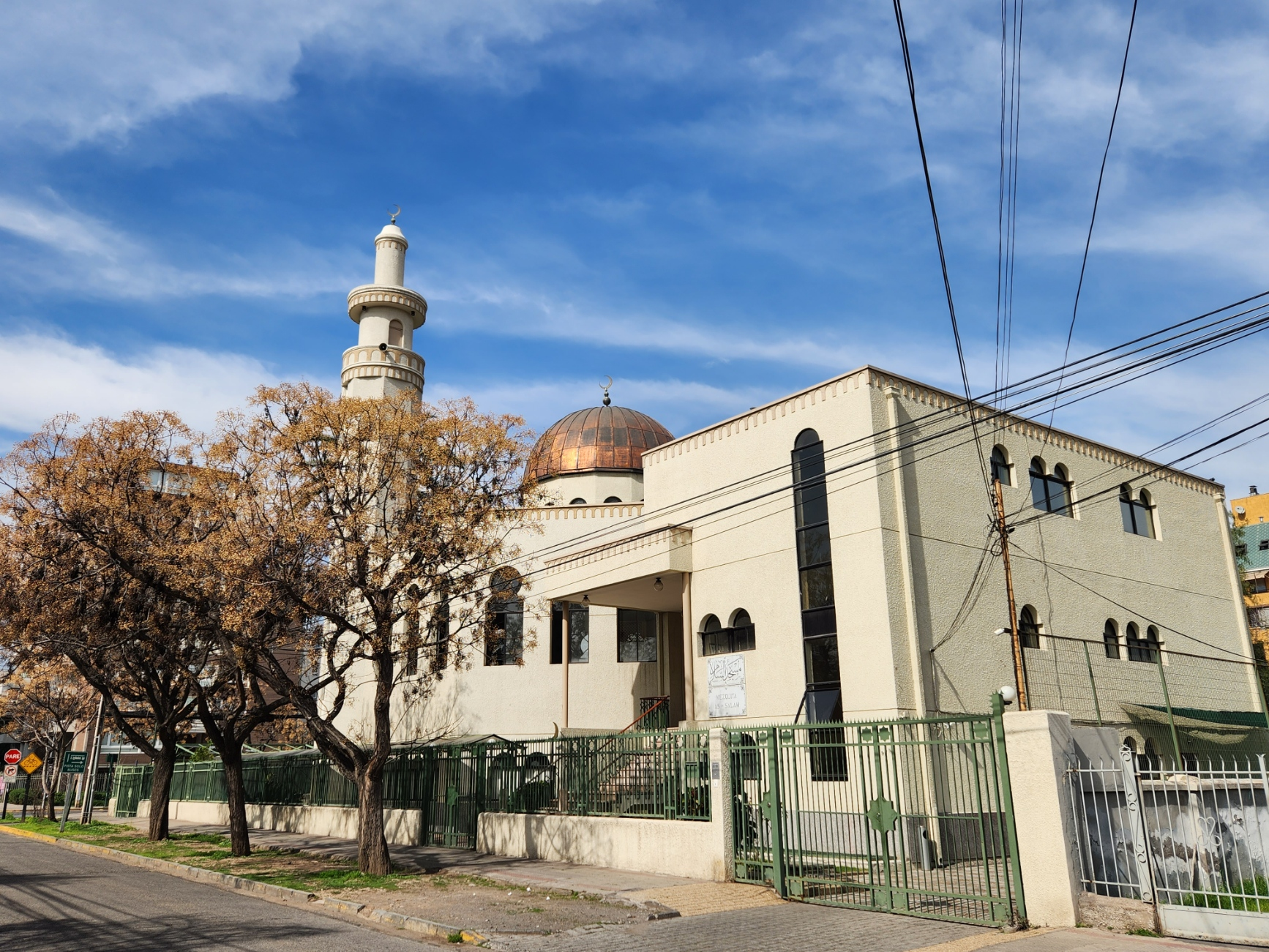
- The mosque in 2023

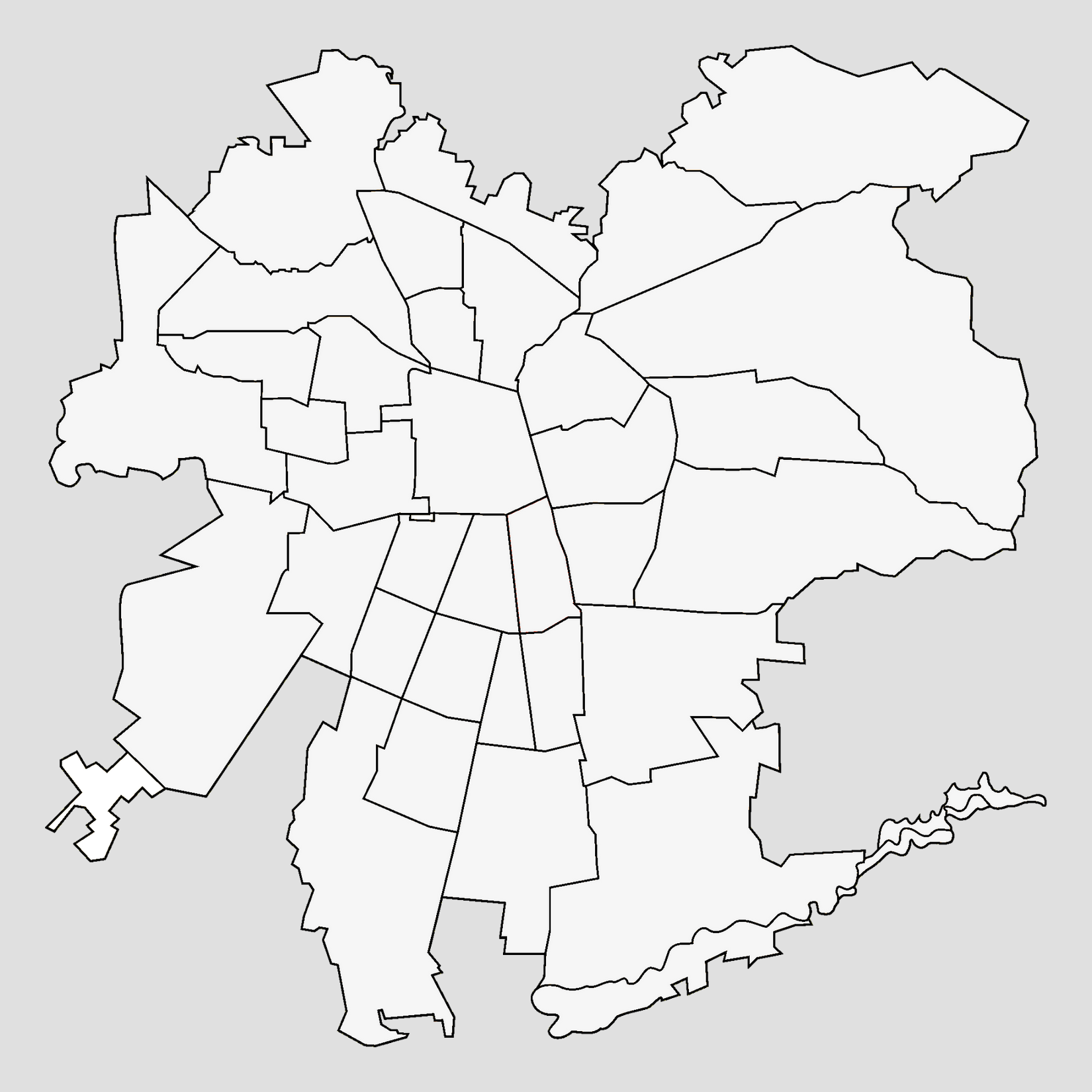
- Location of the mosque in Santiago

Religion
- Affiliation: Sunni Islam
- Ecclesiastical or organizational status: Mosque
- Status: Active

Location
- Location: 2975 Campoamor Street, Ñuñoa, Santiago
- Country: Chile
- Interactive map of As-Salam Mosque
- Coordinates: 33°27′03″S 70°35′55″W

Architecture
- Architect: William Tapia Chuaqui
- Groundbreaking: 1986
- Completed: 1989
- Minaret: 1

Website
- centroislamicodechile.cl

As-Salam Mosque (Spanish: Mezquita As-Salam; Arabic: مسجد السلام, lit. 'Mosque of Peace') is a Sunni Muslim mosque located in Ñuñoa, a commune of the Chilean capital of Santiago. The building was completed in 1989, and was the first mosque in Chile.

== See also ==
- List of mosques in the Americas
- Islam in Chile
