= Coyah =

- Sub-prefecture and town
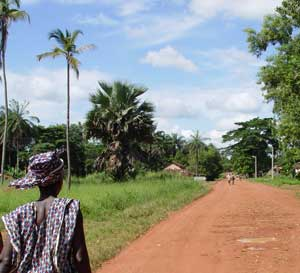
- Madinagbe village in Coyah

- Location in Guinea
- Coordinates: 9°42′N 13°23′W
- Country: Guinea
- Region: Kindia Region
- Prefecture: Coyah Prefecture

Population (2025)
  - Total: 157,387

Coyah is a town and sub-prefecture located in western Guinea. It is the capital of Coyah Prefecture. Its population is 157,387 (2025).

== Notable people ==
- Karim Bangoura (c.1926-1972), diplomat
- Achkar Marof (1930-1971), diplomat
- Kabèlè Abdoul Camara (1950-), diplomat
