= Sinta =

- Sub-prefecture and town
- Location in Guinea
- Coordinates: 10°43′N 13°00′W
- Country: Guinea
- Region: Kindia Region
- Prefecture: Télimélé Prefecture
- Time zone: UTC+0 (GMT)

Sinta is a town and sub-prefecture in the Télimélé Prefecture in the Kindia Region of western-central Guinea.
