= Health in Guinea =

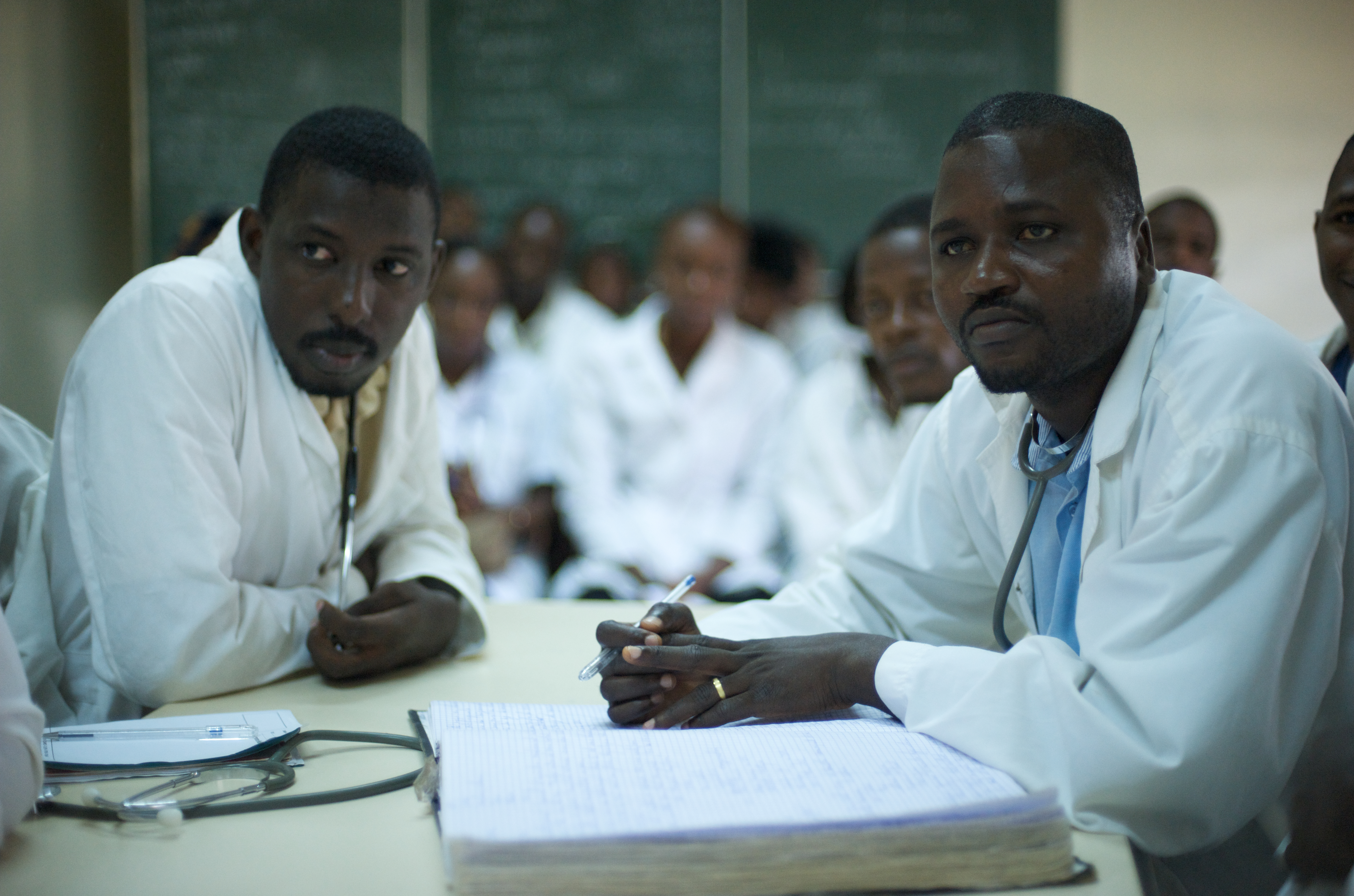
Pediatric doctors at Donka Hospital reviewing measles cases during an epidemic in 2009. Donka is the largest public hospital in Guinea.

Guinea faces a number of ongoing health challenges.

The Human Rights Measurement Initiative finds that Guinea is fulfilling 58.6% of what it should be fulfilling for the right to health based on its level of income. When looking at the right to health with respect to children, Guinea achieves 76.5% of what is expected based on its current income. In regards to the right to health amongst the adult population, the country achieves only 82.3% of what is expected based on the nation's level of income. Guinea falls into the "very bad" category when evaluating the right to reproductive health because the nation is fulfilling only 17.0% of what the nation is expected to achieve based on the resources (income) it has available.

== Health infrastructure ==
Guinea has been reorganizing its health system since the Bamako Initiative of 1987 formally promoted community-based methods of increasing accessibility of drugs and health care services to the population, in part by implementing user fees. The new strategy dramatically increased accessibility through community-based healthcare, resulting in more efficient and equitable provision of services. A comprehensive strategy was extended to all areas of health care, with subsequent improvement in health indicators and improvement in health care efficiency and cost.

Ethnographic research conducted in rural and urban areas of the Republic of Guinea explored perceived distinctions between biomedical and traditional health practices and found that these distinctions shape parental decisions in seeking infant health care, with 93% of all health expenditure taking place outside the state sector.

In June 2011, the Guinean government announced the establishment of an air solidarity levy on all flights taking off from national soil, with funds going to UNITAID to support expanded access to treatment for HIV/AIDS, TB and malaria. Guinea is among the growing number of countries and development partners using market-based transactions taxes and other innovative financing mechanisms to expand financing options for health care in resource-limited settings.

Lacking a sufficient response from the international community during the Ebola outbreak, the health infrastructure was augmented through laboratories and hospital facilities through non-governmental actors such as Doctors without Borders, UC Rusal, or the Ebola Private Sector Mobilisation Group (EPSMG).

=== Hospitals ===
- Clinique Ambroise Paré
- Ignace Deen Hospital
- Donka Hospital, Guinea's largest public hospital.

== Health status ==
=== Life expectancy ===
The 2014 CIA estimated average life expectancy in Guinea was 59.60 years.

=== Ebola ===
A situation map of the Ebola outbreak as of 18 June 2014.

In 2014 there was an outbreak of the Ebola virus in Guinea. In response, the health ministry banned the sale and consumption of bats, thought to be carriers of the disease. Despite this measure, the virus eventually spread from rural areas to Conakry, and by June 2014 had spread to neighbouring countries - Sierra Leone and Liberia. In August 2014 Guinea closed its borders to Sierra Leone and Liberia to help contain the spread of the virus, as more new cases of the disease were being reported in those countries than in Guinea.

The outbreak began in December in a village called Meliandou, southeastern Guinea, near the borders with Liberia and Sierra Leone. The first known case involved a 2-year-old child who died, after fever and vomiting and passing black stool, on 6 December. The child's mother died a week later, then a sister and a grandmother, all with symptoms that included fever, vomiting, and diarrhoea. Then, by way of care-giving visits or attendance at funerals, the outbreak spread to other villages.

"Unsafe burials" is a source of the transmission of the disease. The World Health Organization (WHO) reported that the inability to engage with local communities hindered the ability of health workers to trace the origins and strains of the virus.

While WHO terminated the Public Health Emergency of International Concern (PHEIC) on 29 March 2016, the Ebola Situation Report released on 30 March confirmed 5 more cases in the preceding 2 weeks, with viral sequencing relating 1 of the cases to the November 2014 outbreak.

The Ebola epidemic affected the treatment of other diseases in Guinea. Healthcare visits by the population declined due to fear of infection and to mistrust in the health-care system, and the system's ability to provide routine health-care and HIV/AIDS treatments decreased due to the Ebola outbreak.

=== HIV/AIDS ===
An estimated 170,000 adults and children were infected at the end of 2004. Surveillance surveys conducted in 2001 and 2002 show higher rates of HIV in urban areas than in rural areas. Prevalence was highest in Conakry (5%) and in the cities of the Forest Guinea region (7%) bordering Ivory Coast, Liberia, and Sierra Leone.

HIV is spread primarily through multiple-partner heterosexual intercourse. Men and women are at nearly equal risk for HIV, with young people aged 15 to 24 most vulnerable. Surveillance figures from 2001–2002 show high rates among commercial sex workers (42%), active military personnel (6.6%), truck drivers and bush taxi drivers (7.3%), miners (4.7%), and adults with tuberculosis (8.6%).

Several factors are fueling the HIV/AIDS epidemic in Guinea. They include unprotected sex, multiple sexual partners, illiteracy, endemic poverty, unstable borders, refugee migration, lack of civic responsibility, and scarce medical care and public services.

=== Coronavirus ===
The first case of COVID-19 was reported in Guinea on 13 March 2020. By the end of 2020 the total number of confirmed cases was 13,722. Of these, 13,141 had recovered, 500 were active, and 81 people had died.

=== Malaria ===
Guinea’s entire population is at risk of malaria. According to the Ministry of Health, malaria is the primary cause of consultations, hospitalizations, and deaths in the general population. Among children less than five years of age, malaria accounts for 31 percent of consultations, 25 percent of hospitalizations, and 14 percent of hospital deaths in public facilities. Transmission is year-round with high transmission from July through October in most areas. The majority of infections are caused by Plasmodium falciparum. Between 2011 and 2018, Guinea’s malaria program achieved many major milestones: two universal coverage campaigns with long-lasting insecticide-treated nets (ITNs), decreased stockouts of artemisinin-based combination therapies, the rollout of rapid diagnostic tests, and the recent parasitemia estimates that noted a significant decrease of the prevalence of malaria in children under 5 years of age between the 2012 Demographic and Health Survey (44 percent) and 2016 Multiple Indicator Cluster Survey (15 percent). The national malaria strategy involves free continuous distribution of ITNs through antenatal care, vaccination clinics, schools, and mass campaigns.

=== Malnutrition ===
Malnutrition is a serious problem for Guinea. A 2012 study reported high chronic malnutrition rates, with levels ranging from 34% to 40% by region, as well as acute malnutrition rates above 10% in Upper Guinea’s mining zones. The survey showed that 139,200 children suffer from acute malnutrition, 609,696 from chronic malnutrition and further 1,592,892 suffer from anemia. Degradation of care practices, limited access to medical services, inadequate hygiene practices and a lack of food diversity explain these levels.

=== Maternal and child healthcare ===
The 2010 maternal mortality rate per 100,000 births for Guinea is 680. This is compared with 859.9 in 2008 and 964.7 in 1990. The under 5 mortality rate, per 1,000 births is 146 and the neonatal mortality as a percentage of under 5's mortality is 29. In Guinea the number of midwives per 1,000 live births is 1 and the lifetime risk of death for pregnant women is 1 in 26. Guinea has the second highest prevalence of female genital mutilation in the world.

== See also ==
- Ministry of Health and Public Hygiene (Guinea)
