= Ignace Deen Hospital =

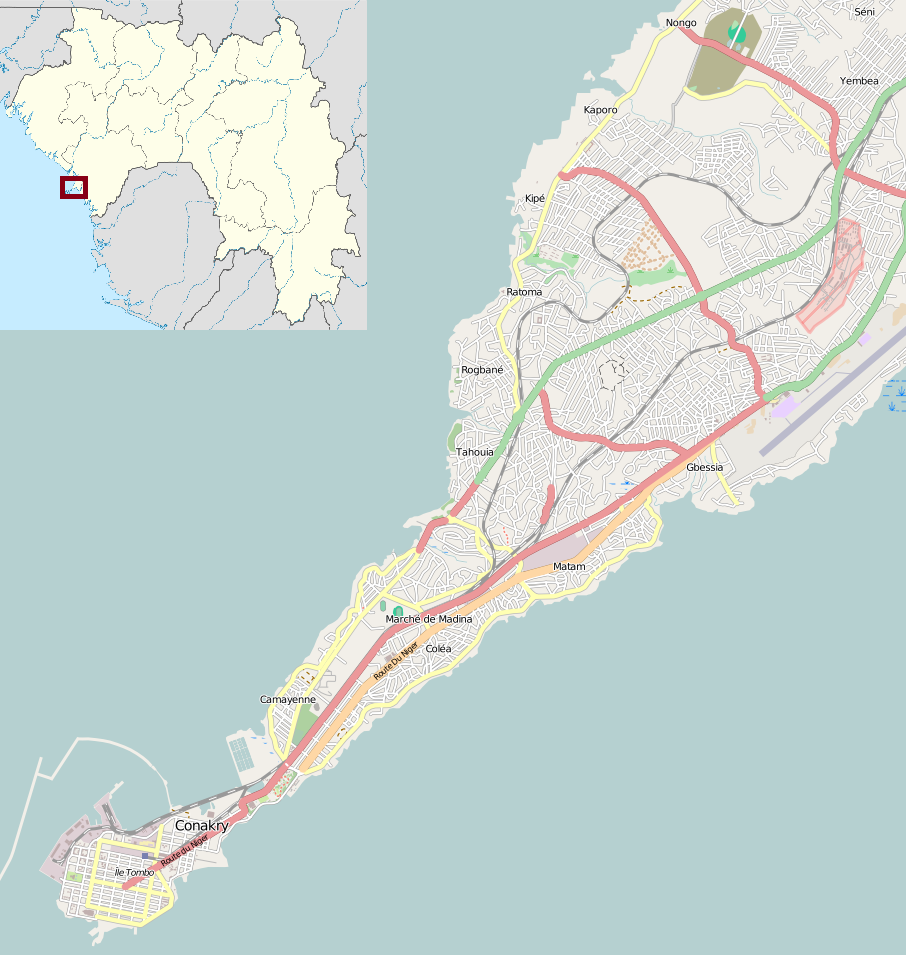
- The hospital's location in Conakry

Geography
- Location: Conakry, Guinea
- Coordinates: 9.5068°N 13.7050°W

Organisation
- Type: University Teaching Hospital

History
- Founded: about 1890

Links
- Lists: Hospitals in Guinea

The Ignace Deen Hospital (Hôpital Ignace Deen) is a hospital in Conakry, Guinea built during the colonial era. The hospital is situated next to the National Museum.

A report in 2011 described the conditions as squalid, with poor quality of care. Since 2017, in collaboration with scientists from the United States and Denmark, Ignace Deen Hospital has acted as a regional hub of neurological research,

== Quality of care ==
A travel guide describes the hospital as "not very reliable". A February 2011 report said the hospital had dilapidated infrastructure, poor sanitation, stifling heat, stench, lack of water and electricity, lack of drugs and maintenance. A bribe was required to gain admittance. There were few doctors. Wards were crowded, infested by bed bugs and mosquitoes. The toilets were clogged and there was an acute shortage of drinking water, which relatives of the patients were expected to supply.

After a serious traffic accident killed two people and seriously injured three others in April 2008, the wounded were rushed to the hospital. There they waited for more than two hours without care, since the nursing staff had not been paid. This is common practice in Guinea, and many patients die due to non-payment before they receive emergency care.

=== Diseases ===
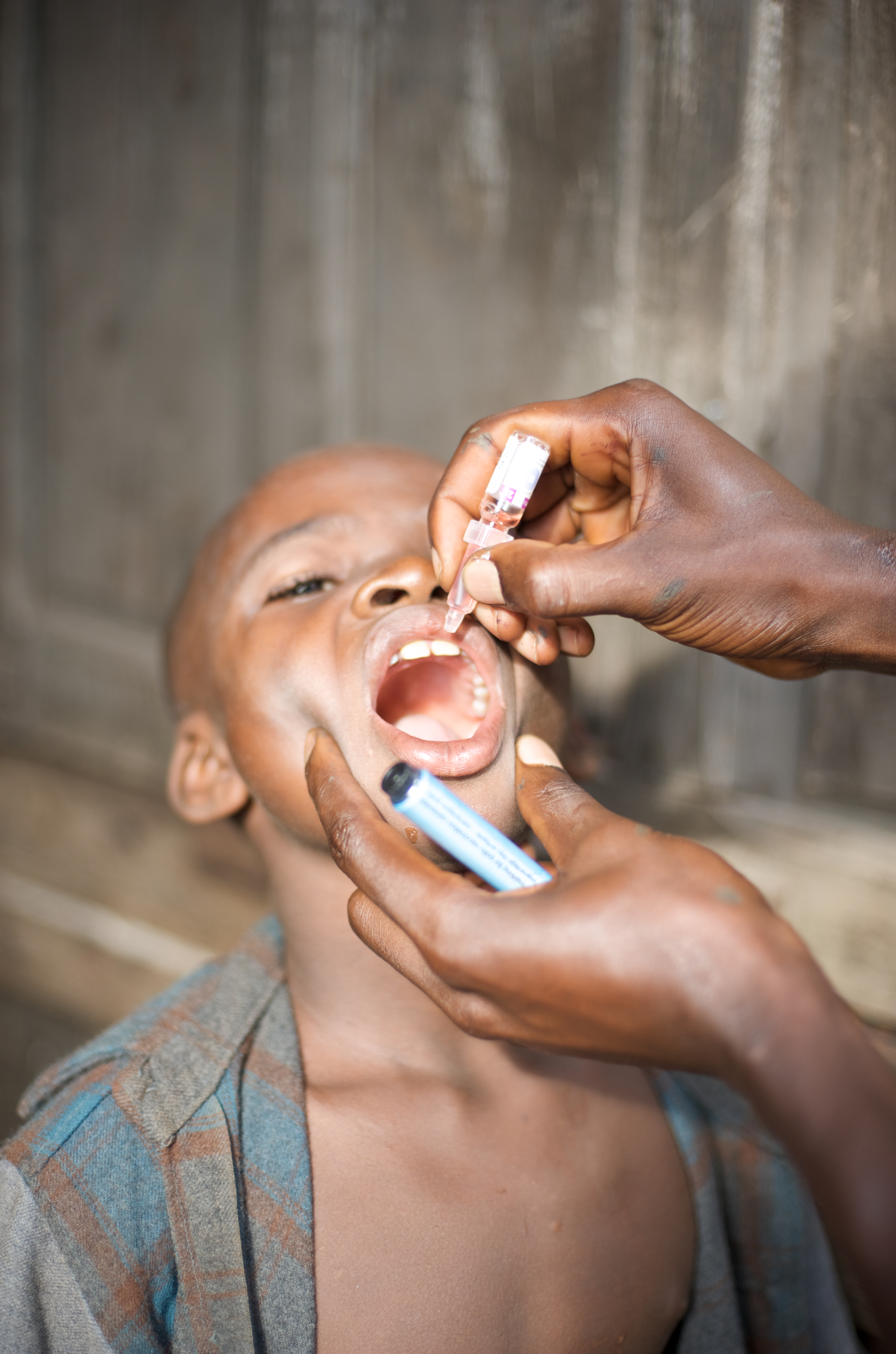
Polio vaccination in Conakry, 2009.

Maternal mortality is high in Guinea due to lack of primary health care, poorly equipped obstetric wards in referral hospitals, untrained personnel and lack of health education. A 1991 study at the hospitals in Guinea found that the main causes of maternal death were abortion complications, which were linked with hypertension, and postpartum bleeding.

A 1995 study at Ignace Deen found that anemia accounted for 65% of all maternal mortality. A study at the hospital showed high rates of sexually transmitted diseases among pregnant women including Candidosis (28.76%), Vaginal Trichomoniasis (13.88%), Chlamydia trachomatis (3.37%), HIV (2.38%), Syphilis (0.99%) and Gonococcus (0.40%).

Over a five-year period, 41 cases of chronic pulmonary heart disease were observed at the hospital, representing 7.14% of hospitalized patients. The condition ranked 4th after hypertension, various myocardiopathies and valvulopathies.

=== Research ===
Since 2017, the Ignace Deen Hospital has been the primary site for several studies examining neurological health in low-income settings. Neurological research at Ignace Deen Hospital has focused on epilepsy and included investigations of traditional healing in the country, smartphone-based diagnostic tools, school status and educational attainment, and autonomous delivery of antiepileptic drugs. These studies have found that epilepsy is a major burden for patients in Guinea. The majority of study participants have reported experiencing >100 seizures in their lifetimes, which falls within criteria for poorly controlled epilepsy. Critically, many patients are unable to access antiepileptic medications in a consistent manner. Additional findings include that traditional healing is nearly universally accessed prior to conventional medicine, and that epilepsy poses a particularly severe burden for children by hampering educational attainment.

== Hospital history ==
The Ignace Deen Hospital, originally called the Hôpital Ballay, was built during the colonial era in the old town.

The original name honored doctor Nöel Ballay, the first governor of Guinea in 1890 after it became separate from Senegal.

The hospital was renamed following independence after a director in the Sékou Touré era, Ignace Deen. The Touré regime was ruthless in suppressing dissent. After the discovery of a coup attempt was announced in 1969, the 42-year-old surgeon-general of the hospital, Dr. Maréga Bocar, was condemned to a lifetime of forced labor.

Between 1986 and 1988, a European project coordinated by the University of Liège rehabilitated the Ignace Deen Hospital. Without European funding, it could never have been rebuilt and re-equipped.

It is one of the two National Hospitals with a reference laboratory, the other being Donka Hospital.

Ignace Deen is also a university hospital (Centre Hospitalo Universitaire, or CHU), as is Donka, the only two in the country.

=== In the news ===
The hospital must periodically deal with the aftermath of political violence. A demonstration on Independence Day on 28 September 1993 was violently suppressed by troops. Official accounts said 18 people died and 198 were injured. Hospital records show 31 deaths, 21 at the Donka hospital and 10 at Ignace Deen, and 225 wounded.

On Independence Day 2009, several thousand people staged a demonstration against the military rule of Captain Moussa Dadis Camara outside the Conakry Grand Mosque. It was reported that demonstrators were "trapped, brutalised, humiliated, beaten up, raped, stabbed and killed by drugged squads of the army". Authorities gave a death toll of 56, but human rights groups reported over 150. The bodies were taken to the morgue in the Ignace Deen Hospital, which was placed under military guard. An International Commission of Inquiry was established to investigate the violence, taking evidence from doctors at Ignace Deen who had given first aid and had heard the firsthand accounts of the victims.

In October 2010, several supporters of the presidential candidate Alpha Condé were admitted to Ignace Deen hospital complaining that they had been poisoned by Fulani. Condé's wife, Mme Djene Kaba Condé, and other female leaders made a public visit to the victims, who appeared to be in considerable pain.

The news caused violence in Upper Guinea, with people from Middle Guinea being killed or expelled and their property vandalized. When the hospital director Mme Hadja Fatoumata Binta Diallo said the Condé supporters were in no danger and no deaths had occurred, Prime Minister Jean Marie Doré suspended her for making speculative statements before a full medical analysis had been completed.

After two weeks, the victims were visited by a team of traditional healers from Upper Guinea who performed gestures and incantations that caused them to immediately return to health. Binta Diallo was reinstated by the President later that month. Following Condé's election, in January 2011 Dr. Mohamed Awada was appointed director-general of the hospital. He replaced Dr Fatoumata Binta Diallo.

== See also ==
- Health in Guinea
