= Islam in Chile =

The statistics for Islam in Chile indicate a Muslim population of 10,197, representing less than 0.07% of the population. There are a number of Islamic organizations in Chile, including the Muslim Society of Chile and As-Salam Mosque (Spanish: Sociedad Musulmana de Chile y Mezquita As-Salam) in Santiago, Bilal Mosque (Mezquita Bilal) in Iquique, the Mohammed VI Cultural Center (Centro Cultural Mohammed VI) in Coquimbo, and Islamic Foundation of Chile in Santiago.

== History ==
According to Chronicles of the History of Chile by Aurelio Díaz Meza, there was a man in the expedition of discoverer Diego de Almagro, called Pedro de Gasco who was a morisco, or Muslim from Spain who was forced to convert from Islam to Catholicism. The coming of moriscos was covered by history but, recently scholars of Chilean history have started acknowledging the country's Moorish heritage and its effects on the development of Chilean culture and identity.

It is known that in 1854 two "Turks" resided in the country, a situation that was repeated in the censuses of 1865 and 1875. Their country of origin is not known, just that they were natives of some territory of the immense Ottoman Empire, and this was followed two years later by the first major wave of Muslims to Chile began in 1856, with the arrival of Arab immigrants from the Ottoman Empire territories consisting of today's Israel, Syria, Lebanon and Palestine.

According to the 1885 census, the number of "Turks" had risen to 29, but there is no precise information on their origin and their faith, since religion was not included in that census. However, the census of 1895 registered the presence of 76 "Turks", 58 of them Muslims, who were primarily concentrated in the north of Chile in Tarapacá, Atacama, Valparaíso and Santiago. In the census of 1907, the Muslim population was reported to have increased to 1,498 people, all of them foreigners. They were 1,183 men and 315 women, representing only 0.04 percent of the population, although this was recorded as the highest percentage of Muslims in Chile's history. In 1920 a new census showed that the number of Muslims had decreased to 402, with 343 men and 59 women. The greatest numbers were in Santiago and Antofagasta, with 76 in each province. The latest census figures from 2002 found a total of 2,894 Muslims living in Chile (0.03% of the population over 15), 66% of whom were men. The previous census of 1992 did not include Islam as an alternative.

In Santiago, the first Islamic institution of Chile, the Society of Muslim Union of Chile (Sociedad Unión Musulmana), was founded on 25 September 1926. Later, on 16 October 1927, the Society of Mutual Aids and Islamic Charity was established. With the 1952 census, the number of Muslims had risen again to 956. The majority lived in Santiago, with the rest of the population scattered in the provinces of Antofagasta, Coquimbo, Valparaíso, O'Higgins, Concepción, Malleco, Cautín and Valdivia, without much organization among them. Their numbers decreased again, so that by 1960 there were only 522, with the majority of 209 living in Santiago. A decade later, the number of Muslims had increased to 1,431. However, the census did not indicate whether they were men or women, nationals or foreigners. Nevertheless, they were spread throughout the country.

In 1988, the construction of the mosque of Santiago named As-Salam Mosque was initiated by Sheikh Taufiq Rumie', who had led the Muslim community for more than sixty years. The mosque was finished in 1989 and was inaugurated by a prince of Malaysia in 1996, and it was reported that by end of the 1980s, some indigenous Chileans had also converted to Islam, with numbers increasing after the completion of the mosque. Muslim Chilean population was increased by the presence of foreign trade and investment from Muslim countries. Many Malaysian businessmen and their families settled Chile after the inauguration of the mosque by a Malaysian prince. Due to the external interference, and especially to the strengthening of Shia Islam by part of the Iranian help in 1996, they inaugurated Centro de Cultura Islámica, in Las Condes, Santiago, where they consolidated a Shi'ite Muslim community who mostly arrived in Chile in the 19th century. Most Shi'ite Muslim Chileans are of Iranian blood; they may still speak Persian and/or other Iranian language, aside from Arabic and Spanish. In 1997, Pakistani retailers purchased land for the construction of the Bilal Mosque and madrasa in Iquique, which was completed in 1999. Following the death of Sheikh Taufiq Rumie' in 1998, Usama Abu Gazaleh was elected Imam of the mosque following the passing of Taufiq Rumie'.

== Infrastructure ==
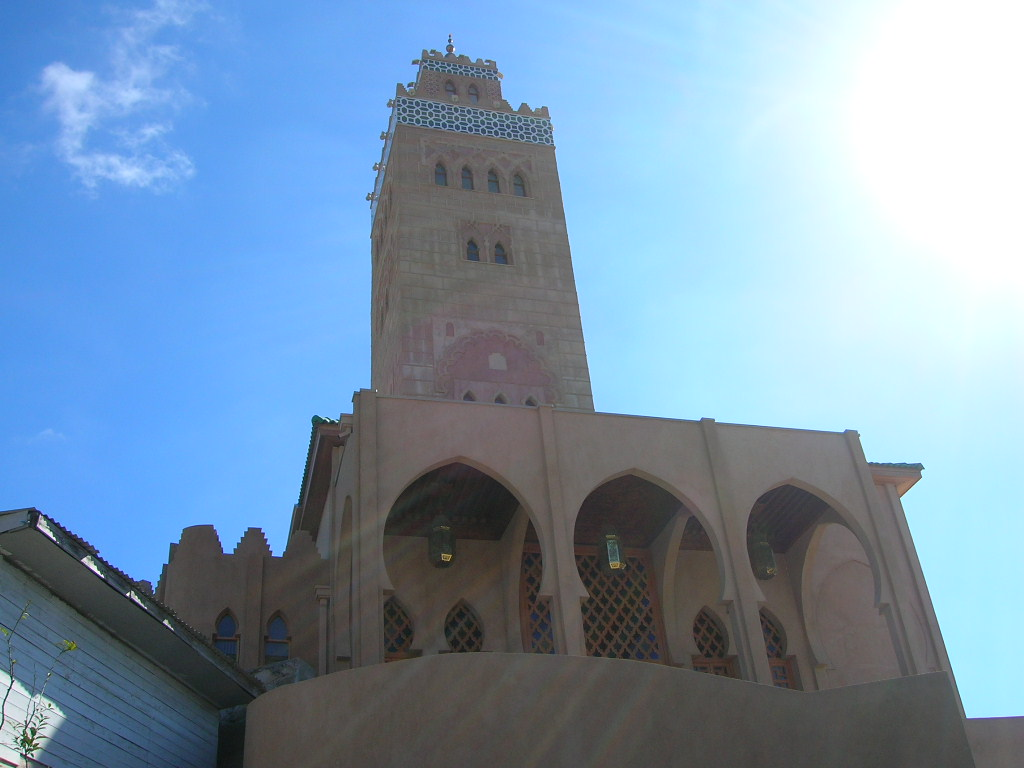
A mosque in Coquimbo.

Through the 1970s and 1980s, there were no religious leaders or centers for praying. Muslims who maintained the faith met in the residence of Taufik Rumie' Dalu, a trader of Syrian origin. In 1990 the construction of the Al-Salam Mosque began, the first in the country. In 1995 another mosque was inaugurated in Temuco, and 1998 a new one in Iquique. In Chile, Islam is primarily the result of Lebanese, Syrian and Palestinian migrations from the 19th and early 20th centuries. Fleeing conditions in the Ottoman Empire, these Levantine immigrants and their descendants permanently settled in Chile and established the first Islamic institutions in the 1920s.

== Demographics ==
Population census
Year	Pop.	±% p.a.
2002	2,894	—
2012	3,288	+1.28%
2024	10,197	+9.89%
Source: INE

Muslims comprise 0.067% of Chile's population aged 15 or older as of 2024. The Santiago Metropolitan Region has the largest Muslim population, with 4,428 people (0.07%). However, two regions have a higher proportion of Muslims than the Metropolitan Region: Tarapacá (0.3%) and Arica y Parinacota (0.08%). Most of Tarapacá's Muslims are Pakistani immigrants who arrived in large numbers in the early 1990s, but there are also Muslims of Moroccan, Lebanese, Syrian, Turkish, Peruvian, Bolivian, and Colombian origin. Iquique is the commune of Chile with both the largest Muslim population in absolute terms and the highest percentage of Muslims, with 753 people representing 0.46% of its population. Tarapacá and Iquique are the only region and commune of Chile where Islam surpasses Judaism, respectively.

== Today ==
There are a number of organizations founded by the Muslim community in Chile, including:

- Asociación Islámica de Chile (Islamic Association of Chile)
- Centro de Cultura y Beneficencia Islámico
- Centro Chileno Islámico de Cultura de Puerto Montt
- Fundación Islámica de Chile (Islamic Foundation of Chile).

== See also ==
Communities

- Latino Muslims
- Latin American Muslims
- Arab Chileans

Mosques

- As-Salam Mosque
- Coquimbo Mosque
- Bilal Mosque, Iquique

Others

- Islamic Organization of Latin America
- Religion in Chile
