= Pierre Camille Victor Huas =

Pierre Camille Victor Huas (29 June 1858 – after 1901) was a French Naval medical officer known as a photographer active in nineteenth century West Africa.

== Naval career ==
Huas joined the French Navy as a 3rd Class Physician in 1880, receiving promotion to 2nd class on 3 May 1884 at Rochefort. 1 January 1885 he was appointed as Medical Staff to the sloop Ardent stationed in Senegal. On January 1, 1886, he was 1st class doctor in residence at Rochefort. He entered the Naval Reserve at Lorient on July 27, 1901.

== Photography ==
He accompanied Jean Bayol on his travels through Rivières du Sud in 1885 taking many photographs on the journey.

== Works ==
- (1886) Considérations sur l'hygiène des troupes en campagne
