= Missira, Kindia =

Missira
- Sub-prefecture and town
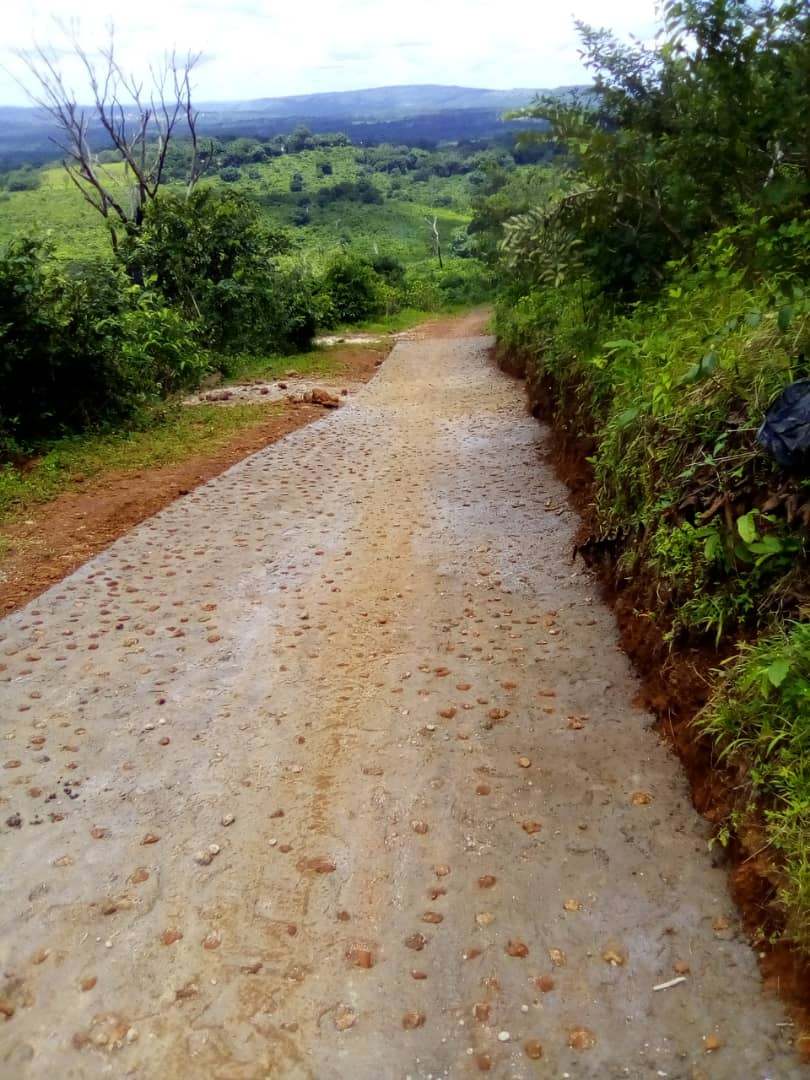

- Location in Guinea
- Coordinates: 11°13′N 13°36′W
- Country: Guinea
- Region: Kindia Region
- Prefecture: Télimélé Prefecture
- Time zone: UTC+0 (GMT)

Missira, Kindia is a town and sub-prefecture in the Télimélé Prefecture in the Kindia Region of western-central Guinea.
