= William Fernandez =

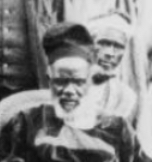
William Fernandez; Pierre Huas (1885)

William Fernandez was a Luso-African in the Pongo River area of Guinea in the early nineteenth century.

In the 1750s William Settel Fernandes married the daughter of a Baga leader.

In 1885, at Rio Nunez, Dr. Bayol, the future governor of Rivières du Sud, met William Fernandez king of the Bramaya.
