= Télimélé Prefecture =

Coordinates: 10°54′22″N 13°02′36″W

- Prefecture
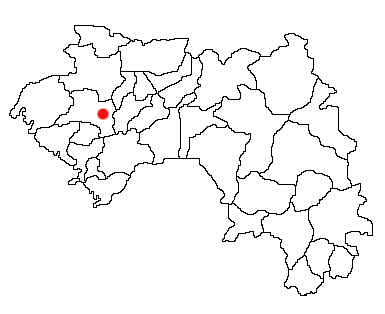
- Location of Télimélé Prefecture and seat in Guinea.
- Country: Guinea
- Region: Kindia Region
- Capital: Télimélé

Area
  - Total: 9,216 km^{2} (3,558 sq mi)

Population (2014 census)
  - Total: 284,409
  - Density: 30.86/km^{2} (79.93/sq mi)
- Time zone: UTC+0 (Guinea Standard Time)

Télimélé is a prefecture located in the Kindia Region of Guinea. The capital is Télimélé. The prefecture covers an area of 9,216 km.² and has an estimated population of 284,409.

== Sub-prefectures ==
The prefecture is divided administratively into 14 sub-prefectures:

1. Télimélé-Centre
2. Bourouwal
3. Daramagnaky
4. Gougoudjé
5. Koba
6. Kollet
7. Konsotamy
8. Missira
9. Santou
10. Sarékaly
11. Sinta
12. Sogolon
13. Tarihoye
14. Thionthian
