= Mohammed VI Mosque (Coquimbo) =

Mosque in Coquimbo, Chile

- Centro Mohammed VI para el Diálogo de las Civilizaciones
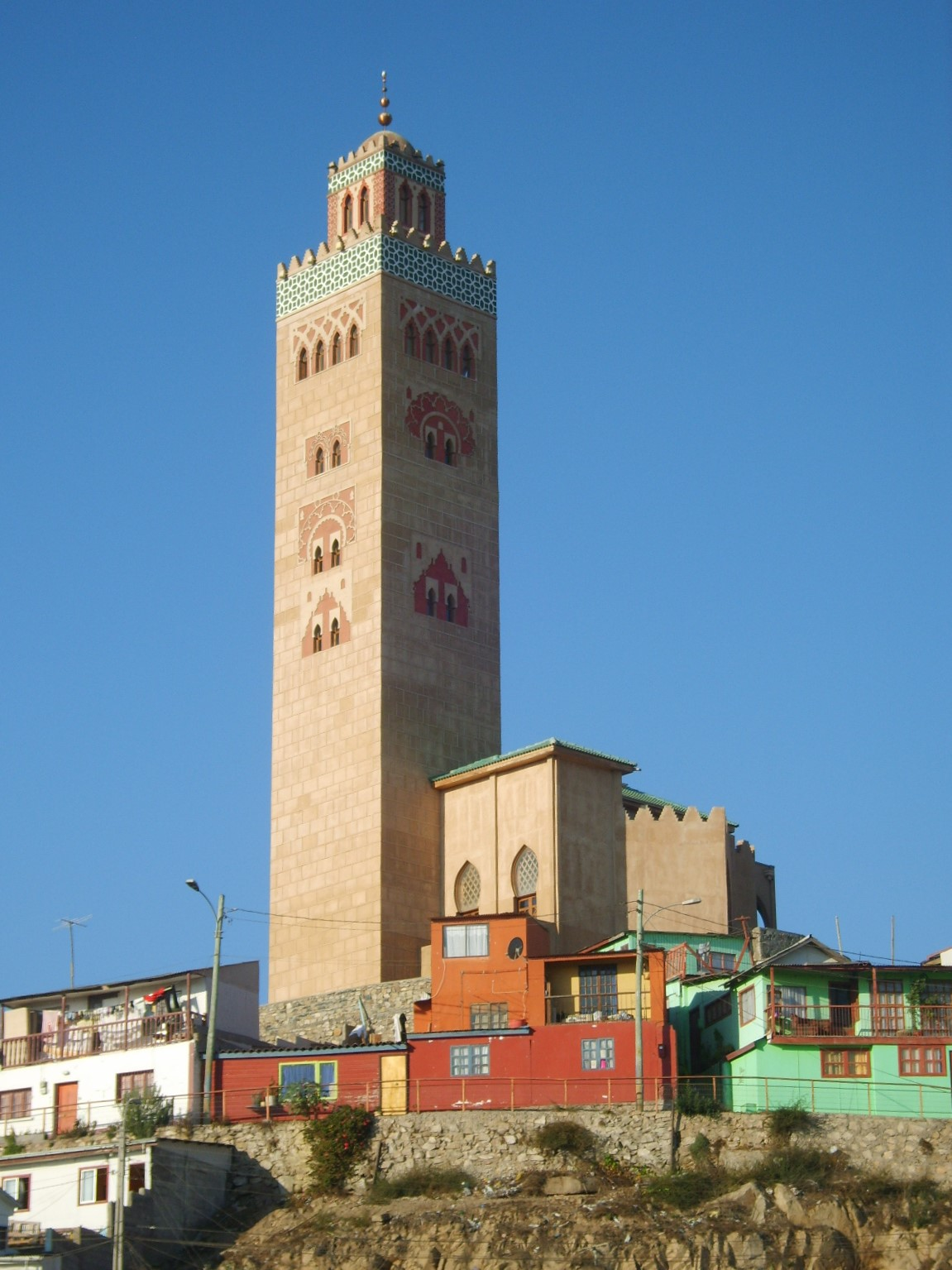

- Location of the mosque in Chile

Religion
- Affiliation: Islam
- Ecclesiastical or organizational status: Mosque
- Status: Active

Location
- Location: Coquimbo
- Country: Chile
- Interactive map of Mohammed VI Mosque
- Coordinates: 29°57′47″S 71°20′07″W

Architecture
- Architect: Faissal Cherradi
- Type: Mosque
- Funded by: Kingdom of Morocco
- Completed: 2007

Specifications
- Minaret: 1
- Minaret height: 40 m (130 ft)

The Mohammed VI Center for Dialogue of Civilizations (Spanish: Centro Mohammed VI para el Diálogo de las Civilizaciones) is a mosque in Coquimbo, Chile. The structure is a replica of the Kutubiyya Mosque in Marrakesh and was funded by the Kingdom of Morocco and the municipality of Coquimbo, being named in honor of king Mohammed VI of Morocco.

The mosque receives 25 thousand visitors every year.

== Overview ==
Construction began in 2004, led by Moroccan architect Faissal Cherradi, and finished in 2007. The building was inaugurated by then mayor of Coquimbo Oscar Pereira and Moroccan delegates.

The complex also contains a cultural center, a library and a museum. A renovation project funded by the municipality of Coquimbo and the embassy of Morocco in Chile began in 2019.

The project, funded by the municipality of Coquimbo and the Kingdom of Morocco, spans 722 square metres (7,770 sq ft) and features a 40-metre-high (130 ft) minaret. It includes a cultural center open to the public, comprising two prayer halls (the mosque), a specialized library with texts in Spanish, Arabic, and other languages (which also serves as a conference room), and a museum.

== See also ==
- Islam in Chile
- List of mosques in the Americas
