= Sinta (name) =

Female given name

- Gender: Female
- Name day: Latvia: 4 June

Origin
- Region of origin: Indonesia, Latvia

Sinta is a Latvian and Indonesian feminine given name.

== Notable people named Sinta ==
- Sinta Nuriyah (born 1948), former First Lady of Indonesia
- Sinta Ozoliņa-Kovala (born 1988), Latvian javelin thrower
- Sinta Tantra (born 1979), British artist
- Sinta Wullur (born 1958), Indonesian-Dutch gamelan musician and composer
