= Donka Hospital =

- LOGO HOPITAL DONKA

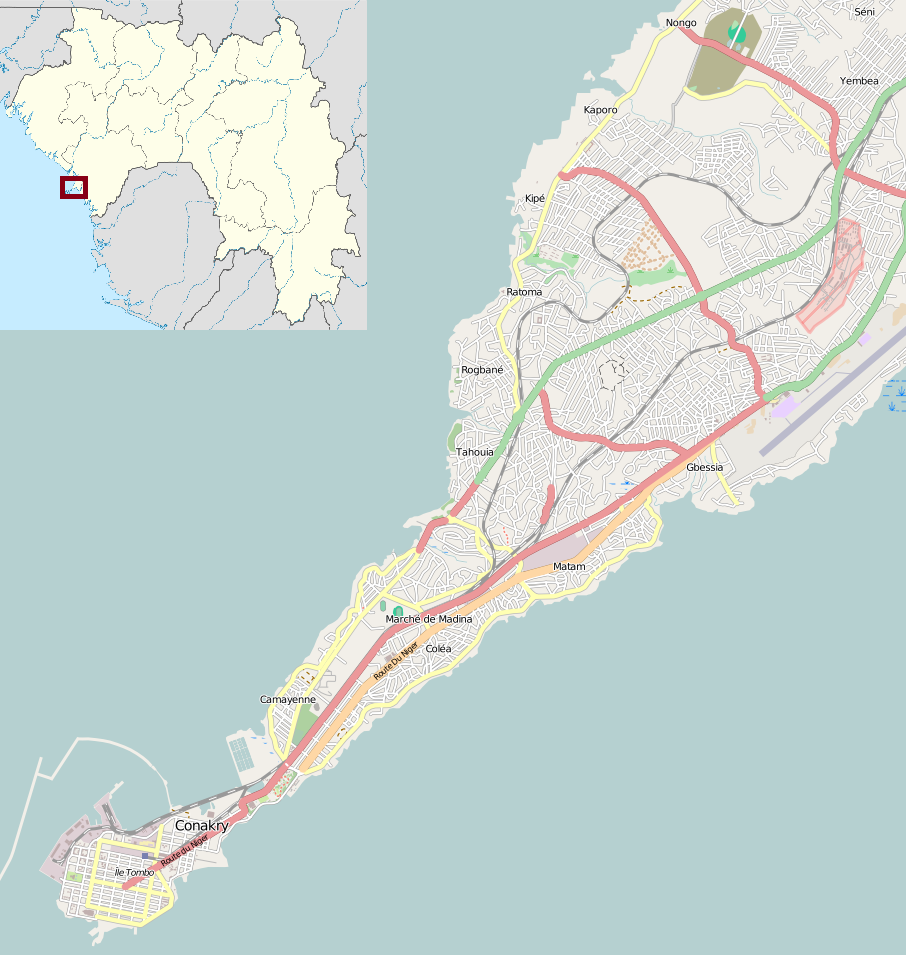
- The hospital's location in Conakry

Geography
- Location: Conakry, Guinea
- Coordinates: 9.537593°N 13.682726°W

Organisation
- Type: University Teaching Hospital

Links
- Lists: Hospitals in Guinea

The Donka Hospital is a publicly owned hospital in Conakry, Guinea. It has inadequate facilities to handle demand, and many Guineans cannot afford its services. More than once in recent years the hospital has had to deal with a major influx of patients wounded in civil disturbances.

== Facilities ==
Donka is a University Teaching Hospital, one of two in Conakry, the other being Ignace Deen Hospital. It is located to the northeast of the Conakry Grand Mosque and across the main road from the infamous Camp Boiro. It is the largest public hospital in the country, built in 1959 just before independence. The Soviet Union assisted in its construction.

Sewage is treated by autonomous wastewater treatment plants funded by the World Bank. The hospital receives priority supply of electricity, but blackouts were frequent in 2006 when oil prices soared. The hospital did not have enough money to pay for fuel for the main back-up power generator.

The Orthopedic Department was established in February 1982. At that time, the main problems it addressed were neglected poliomyelitis cases. In 2004, the West Africa Health Organization (WAHO), working with the Guinea Government, began giving two-year courses in ophthalmology for General Practice Doctors, with intensive theoretical and practical training. Facilities were insufficient. CBM, Sightsavers and WAHO arranged to build a new facility in the teaching hospital compound, which was opened on 9 April 2010.

== Treatment ==
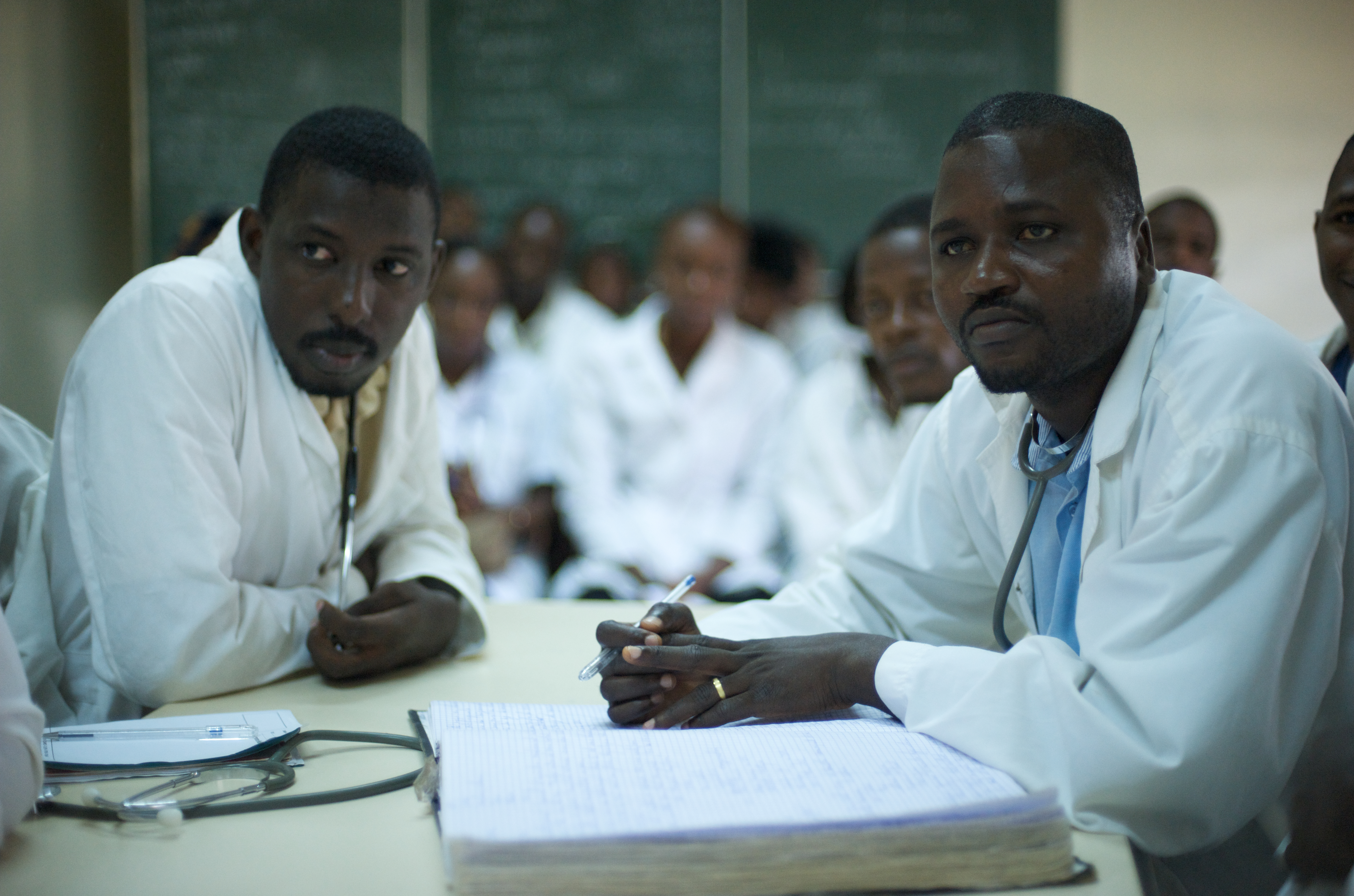
Pediatric doctors at Donka Hospital reviewing measles cases during an epidemic in 2009.

A 1989 study found that maternal mortality at the hospital was 12.47 per 1,000, an extremely high figure. Causes include lack of primary health care or peripheral obstetrical services, poor training of nurses and midwives and lack of general health education among the public. In March 2011, the general wardroom for pre-mature babies in the Maternity Center had four incubators, but only one was working. It held five babies. The center is not equipped to handle the demand. About 80% of premature babies die within a few days.

The Donka Hospital Institute of Nutrition and Child Health is the only children's hospital in Conakry. Between January and the end of September 2006, 623 malnourished children were admitted, a significant increase over previous years. The "dark, airless wards" were overcrowded, with some children sleeping two to a bed.

The hospital's dialysis department has five dialysis machines and can only treat 21 patients. There are private dialysis centers, but most patients cannot pay the $100 cost of the treatment. The Donka hospital provides training for mass marketing, communication and marketing aspects of prevention of HIV/AIDS, funded by the World Bank and other sources.

== Patient charges ==
The hospital has built up debt over the years, and cannot persuade the government or aid agencies to help with repayments. It therefore enforces a rigorous pay-as-you-go policy, which puts treatment and drugs out of reach of many poor people. New patients must first be tested for life-threatening illnesses such as tuberculosis, AIDS, cholera, malaria and cancer. The cost of a measles vaccine is as low as US$1.

Since many Guineans do not have enough money to pay for the blood test, they cannot get medical attention at the hospital. The director of the hospital, Dr Taibou Barry, acknowledged the problem in 2003, saying: "The families are poor and when they come to the hospital, they have to pay for everything, and that’s probably all the money they have, so they must choose to eat or to come to the hospital".

A 2008 report from IRIN described the case of Aboubacar Traoré, who took his two-year-old daughter to the hospital for emergency medical treatment. Although the fee for consultation was $5, as shown on a sign on the wall, the doctor demanded more. Another doctor at the hospital said she was not surprised. She said "I have seen colleagues here persuade patients that only they can treat them, and once the patient has gained trust in that doctor, he or she bribes the patient".

== Civil unrest ==
At the start of 2007, strikes and protests were called due to rising commodity prices and falling living standards, coupled with pervasive corruption and political unrest. In the ensuing violence, about 180 people died and over 1,000 were injured. The International Committee of the Red Cross (ICRC) provided six vehicles to take wounded people to Donka Hospital on 22 January 2007. 119 patients were admitted, most with bullet wounds. The ICRC supplied a surgical kit for treating up to 150 gunshot victims to the hospital. Donka hospital cared for at least 800 wounded people, assisted by Médecins Sans Frontières. According to Djoulde Barry, director general of the hospital, 33 dead were registered there.

On 28 September 2009 a demonstration against the military junta at a city stadium was violently suppressed by security forces, with dozens of deaths and hundreds of injuries. Women reported that soldiers had raped them in public in the stadium. Medical records from Donka Hospital showed that at least 32 of the women protesters were raped. More than 220 first aid workers from the Red Cross Society of Guinea gave emergency medical assistance to more than 350 wounded people and took the most serious cases to the hospitals, mostly to the Donka National Hospital. The injured packed the emergency room. Military from the Presidential Guard and Anti-Drug and Anti-Organized Crime Unit showed up around 3:00 pm that day. They fired their rifles into the air, destroyed medicines and yelled at the wounded to leave the hospital. They prevented anyone else from entering the building. The register of people treated was later lost.

Following the 28 September violence, the ICRC gave essential medical and surgical items to Conakry's hospitals, including kits to treat bullet wounds, masks, gloves and saline solution, and also provided body bags. The ICRC and the Red Cross Society of Guinea tried to reunite family members, particularly children, who had been separated in the violence. The NGO Terre des hommes was providing meals to patients in the Hospital, with the Health Ministry and private donations assisting in the supply of food. As follow-up to the violence, the ICRC helped Donka Hospital revise its emergency plan for handling a large influx of patients with bullet wounds.

Further violence occurred before the October 2010 Presidential run-off elections. Supporters of the candidate Cellou Dalein Diallo of the Union of Democratic Forces of Guinea threw stones at police, who responded with gunfire. Two people were killed and at least 29 people were injured, treated in private clinics or Donka Hospital. The victims included "13 adolescents and three young girls". Violence continued after the elections, which were disputed. On 16 November 2010, Donka hospital reported treating 30 gunshot wounds, mostly direct shots rather than from stray bullets.

== Western attention ==
The bleak conditions in the hospital were the subject of a 1996 documentary Donka, radioscopie d'un hôpital africain by the Belgian director Thierry Michel. On 27 January 2009, a group of Marines from the U.S. Embassy delivered toys to each of the children at the Pediatric Hospital. The actress Mia Farrow, who serves as a UNICEF Goodwill Ambassador, visited the hospital in May 2010. She saw three newborn infants in one incubator in the maternity ward. She met mothers of severely malnourished children, and saw children fighting measles and other preventable childhood killer diseases. She said "It is wrenching to watch a child dying of a disease that is completely preventable. This is a result of Guinea's failing health system".

== See also ==
- Health in Guinea
