= Kalia mine =

Iron ore mine in Faranah Region, Guinea

- Location: Faranah Region, Guinea
- Products: Iron ore
- Opened: 2014

The Kalia mine is a large iron mine located in central Guinea in the Faranah Region. Kalia represents one of the largest iron ore reserves in Guinea and in the world having estimated reserves of 6.16 billion tonnes of ore grading 54.1% iron metal.
