= Institut supérieur de technologie de Mamou =

School in Mamou Prefecture, Guinea

Higher Institute of Technology of Mamou
- Institut supérieur de technologie de Mamou
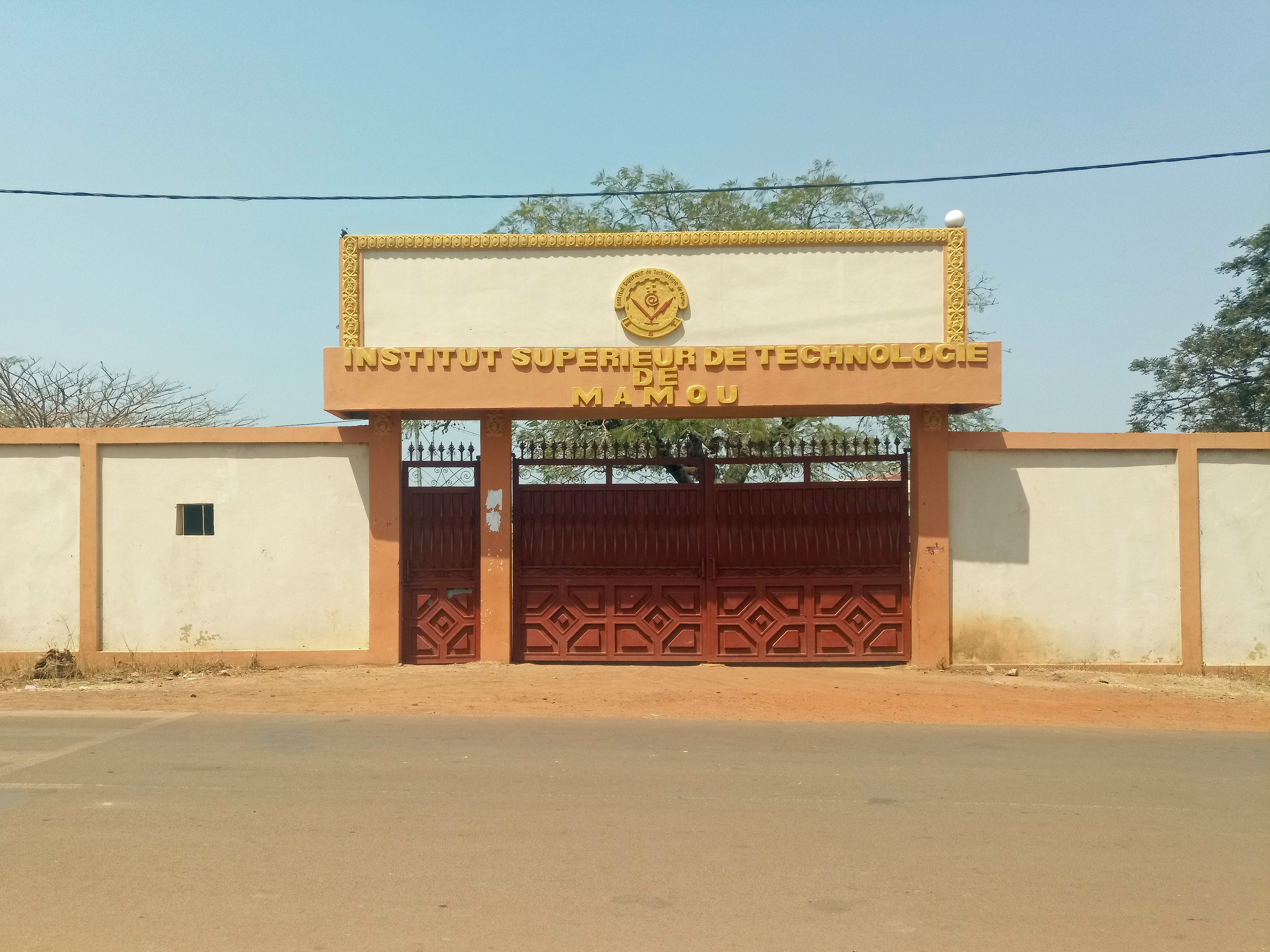
- Entrance of the Higher Institute of Technology of Mamou
- Type: Public institution
- Established: August 25, 2004
- Affiliation: Gamal Abdel Nasser University of Conakry
- Director: Hamidou Barry
- Location: Mamou, Guinea; 10.350°N 12.097°W
- Language: French
- Website: istmamou.org

The Higher Institute of Technology of Mamou (IST-Mamou) is a public higher education institution in Guinea, located in Téliko in the Prefecture of Mamou, in the center-west of the country.

Under the supervision of the Ministry of Higher Education, Scientific Research and Innovation (Guinea), it is the oldest higher education institute in the Mamou Region. It trains approximately 200 engineers per year.

== Location ==
The IST is situated on the site of a former school in Téliko, a district located 4 kilometres (2.5 mi) from the town of Mamou. The campus includes three classroom buildings, a computer lab, a laboratory, and a mosque.

== History ==
The IST was inaugurated on January 25, 2004, officially established by a decree on August 25, 2004, as part of a policy to decentralize higher education institutions (HEIs) in the Republic of Guinea. The first class commenced in 2008 with 106 students. The institute now graduates approximately 200 engineers per year.

The name of economist and minister Abdoulaye Yéro Baldé was given to the 11th graduating class in June 2019. At that time, 537 students, including 63 women, had received their diplomas.

According to authorities, the presence of the IST and the forthcoming establishment of a tablet assembly and manufacturing plant near Mamou are expected to transform the area into a "Silicon Valley."

The general director of the IST is Professor Cellou Kanté, who had been confirmed in his position in 2017.

== Programs ==
The IST of Mamou offers six technological programs:

- Bachelor of Science in Computer engineering
- Bachelor of Science in Mechanical Design and Manufacturing
- Bachelor of Science in Biomedical Equipment Technology
- Bachelor of Science in Instrumentation and Physical Measurements
- Bachelor of Science in Laboratory Techniques
- Bachelor of Science in Energy Engineering

== Partnerships ==
On October 21, 2019, the IST signed a partnership agreement with the University of Artois in France.

== Awards and recognitions ==
- 2020: The UMEAO prize at the 8th edition of the African Invention and Technological Innovation Fair in Brazzaville

== See also ==
- Gamal Abdel Nasser University of Conakry
