= Forécariah Prefecture =

Coordinates: 9°26′05″N 13°05′07″W

- Prefecture
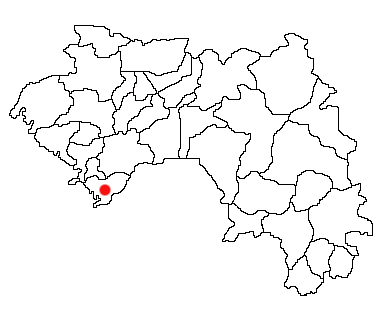
- Location of Forécariah Prefecture and seat in Guinea.
- Country: Guinea
- Region: Kindia Region
- Capital: Forécariah

Area
  - Total: 4,384 km^{2} (1,693 sq mi)

Population (2014 census)
  - Total: 242,942
  - Density: 55.42/km^{2} (143.5/sq mi)
- Time zone: UTC+0 (Guinea Standard Time)

Forécariah is a prefecture located in the Kindia Region of Guinea. The capital is Forécariah. The prefecture covers an area of 4,384 km^{2} and has a 2014 census population of 242,942.

== Sub-prefectures ==
The prefecture is divided administratively into 10 sub-prefectures:

1. Forécariah-Centre
2. Alassoya
3. Benty
4. Farmoriah
5. Kaback
6. Kakossa
7. Kallia
8. Maférinya
9. Moussaya
10. Sikhourou
