= Mohammed VI Mosque (Conakry) =

Mosque in Conakry, Guinea

- Mosquée turque de Koloma

- Location within Guinea

Religion
- Affiliation: Islam
- Ecclesiastical or organizational status: mosque
- Status: Active

Location
- Location: Conakry, Guinea
- Interactive map of Mohammed VI Mosque
- Coordinates: 9°35′26″N 13°37′43″W

Architecture
- Type: Mosque
- Completed: 2017

Specifications
- Capacity: 3,000 worshippers
- Domes: 1 (large; many smaller)
- Minaret: 2
- Site area: 4,040 m^{2} (43,500 sq ft)

The Mohammed VI Mosque (French: Mosquée turque de Koloma) is a mosque in Conakry, Guinea.

== Overview ==
The construction of the mosque was inaugurated on 24 February 2017 in a ceremony attended by President Alpha Condé and Morocco King Mohammed VI.

The mosque building was constructed on a site area of 4,040 square metres (43,500 sq ft), which also includes a library, conference room and administrative pavilion. It has the capacity of 3,000 worshippers.

== See also ==
- Islam in Guinea
- List of mosques in Guinea
