= International Diabetes Center at Park Nicollet =

Center for diabetes care, research and education in Minnesota

- Industry: HealthPartners Institute
- Founded: 1967; 59 years ago in Minneapolis, Minnesota, United States
- Founder: Donnell D. Etzwiler
- Headquarters: St. Louis Park, United States
- Website: www.internationaldiabetescenter.com

International Diabetes Center at Park Nicollet (IDC) is a center for diabetes care, research and education located in Minneapolis, Minnesota, United States. The center provides clinical, motivational and educational services for people with diabetes. It is part of HealthPartners Institute.

IDC has conducted more than 350 clinical research studies since 1979, involving medications, medical devices and new diabetes technologies. The center has also been involved in several large National Institutes of Health (NIH) studies including Diabetes Control and Complications Trial (DCCT), Epidemiology of Diabetes Interventions and Complications (EDIC), Action to Control Cardiovascular Risk in Diabetes (ACCORD) and Glycemia Reduction Approaches in Diabetes: A Comparative Effectiveness (GRADE).

IDC provides professional education programs for diabetes educators, dietitians, physicians, nurses and other health care professionals in the United States. IDC has also trained health care professionals in 33 other countries. A partial list includes Russia, Mexico, Brazil, China, Japan, India, Saudi Arabia, Turkey, Australia, Poland, France, Denmark and Norway.

== History ==
International Diabetes Center was founded in 1967 by Donnell D. Etzwiler a pediatric endocrinologist. Originally called the Diabetes Education and Detection Center, it was located in Asbury Methodist Hospital in downtown Minneapolis. In 1982, to reflect growing involvement in international diabetes training, the center was renamed the International Diabetes Center. Three years later it was moved to its present location as part of the Park Nicollet Clinic–St. Louis Park campus.

The center emphasized a team concept of diabetes management, which actively involved the doctor, nurse, dietitian and patient in managing the disease. The center practiced this concept with its patients and began to develop education programs and publications to share the team approach with other health professionals.

=== Chronological list of research and events ===
- 1976: Donnell D. Etzwiler serves as president of the American Diabetes Association.
- 1983: Participation begins in the Diabetes Control and Complications Trial (DCCT), funded by the National Institutes of Health. This long-term study shows that lowering blood glucose to near-normal levels reduces the risk of diabetes-related eye, kidney and nerve disease.
- 1985: The center is designated a World Health Organization (WHO) Collaborating Center for Diabetes Education, Translation and Computer Technology.
- 1988: The center receives a grant from Becton Dickinson to develop a comprehensive, systematic approach for primary care providers. This leads to a textbook providing clinical guidelines for detecting and treating diabetes called Staged Diabetes Management.
- 1994: The center is chosen for the Epidemiology of Diabetes Interventions and Complications (EDIC) study. It remains an active site with EDIC study results showing that establishing an early level of control in blood glucose has long-lasting effects on the development of diabetes complications, even if that control is not maintained. The concept is labeled metabolic memory or “imprinting.”
- 1995: Dietitians at IDC conduct a study to evaluate the effectiveness of medical nutrition therapy (MNT) in managing type 2 diabetes. The findings support that dietitian education alone improves glycemic control. This is a pivotal study that confirms the role of nutrition education and management in people with type 2 diabetes.
- 2003: Working with General Mills, Inc., Richard M. Bergenstal and Diane Reader, co-author Betty Crocker's Diabetes Cookbook.
- 2008: IDC conducts the Hypertension and Diabetes Initiative, working with 12 U.S. health care organizations to improve blood pressure control in people with diabetes. The study finds that a collaborative that offers focus, structure and strategies to help health care organizations standardize and customize processes for blood pressure management can improve blood pressure control in people with diabetes.
- 2011: The center participates in the T1D Exchange, developed by the Jaeb Center for Health Research and funded by a grant from the Leona M. and Harry B. Helmsley Charitable Trust. The T1D Exchange is designed to better understand type 1 diabetes, improve care, and accelerate new therapies for the disease through collaborative research and data sharing. It combines traditional clinical research with the fields of health information and social networking.
- 2011: Under the auspices of the World Health Organization (WHO) Collaborating Center for Diabetes Education, Translation and Computer Technology, led by Roger S. Mazze, PhD, IDC worked jointly with Mayo Clinic to train physicians in China. With grant funding from Sanofi China, the joint team developed and delivered a program to prepare 500 Chinese physicians in advances in diabetes research, care and education. The program was active from 2011 to 2015.
- 2013: The center is a research site in the National Institutes of Health Glycemia Reduction Approaches in Diabetes: A Comparative Effectiveness (GRADE) Study." The long-term study is comparing the long-term benefits and risks of four widely used diabetes drugs in combination with metformin, the most common first-line drug for treating type 2 diabetes. The study will compare drug effects on glucose levels, adverse effects, diabetes complications and quality of life over an average of nearly five years.
- 2016: Margaret (Maggie) Powers, dietitian and research scientist at the center, serves as president, health care and education, of the American Diabetes Association.
- 2016: The center is one of 10 research sites globally to study the Medtronic 670G hybrid closed-loop insulin delivery system, sometimes referred to as an “artificial pancreas.” Study results are published in the Journal of the American Medical Association (JAMA). The U.S. Food and Drug Administration approves the device for use by type 1 diabetes patients in September 2016.
- 2017: IDC and Schneider Children's Medical Center in Israel together are awarded a grant from the National Institute of Diabetes and Digestive and Kidney Diseases (part of the National Institutes of Health) to continue their work in artificial pancreas research. They will compare the FDA-approved hybrid closed-loop system to a next-generation artificial pancreas system, programmed to further improve glucose control.
