= Islam in Guinea =

Islam is the main religion in Guinea, followed by an estimated 85% of the population as of 2022. "Most are Sunnis who follow the Maliki legal tradition and Qadiri and Tijani Sufi orders."

== History ==
The Grand Mosque of Conakry

Islam spread from its birthplace in the Arabian Peninsula to Africa. Sundiata Keita (c. 1217 – c. 1255), the founder of the Mali Empire (which encompassed part of present-day Guinea as well as other modern nations), was not a Muslim, but by 1300, his successors were. The tenth ruler of the empire, Musa I (c. 1280 – c. 1337), made it the state religion.

Fouta Djallon, a highland region of Guinea, has been a stronghold of Islam since the late 17th century. The Imamate of Futa Jallon, a Muslim theocratic state ruled by the almami, was founded around 1725.

Eventually, the area of present-day Guinea came under colonial rule, and French Guinea was established in 1891, but that had little effect on the spread of the religion. In the 20th century, the Ahmadiyya movement was introduced into the country from Pakistan.

After Guinea achieved independence from France in 1958, Ahmed Sékou Touré, its Marxist first president, sought to reduce Islam's influence, but as his popularity declined, in the 1970s he worked "to co-opt Muslim institutions to legitimize his rule." Touré had the Grand Mosque built in the capital city of Conakry, with funding from Saudi King Fahd; it opened in 1982. It is the largest mosque in West Africa, with an inner hall that can hold 10,000.

== Education ==
The compulsory education curriculum does not include religious studies, but there are numerous Islamic schools throughout the country, particularly in Fouta Djallon. Some madrasas are financially supported by Saudi Arabia, Kuwait and other Gulf states.

== Mosques ==
- Grand Mosque of Conakry
- Mohammed VI Mosque
- Mosque of Dinguiraye
- Mosque of Kankan
