= Dubréka Prefecture =

Coordinates: 9°47′03″N 13°31′03″W

- Prefecture
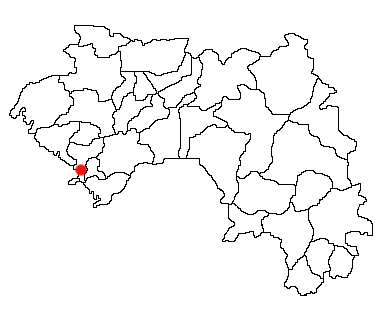
- Location of Dubréka Prefecture and seat in Guinea.
- Country: Guinea
- Region: Kindia Region
- Capital: Dubréka

Area
  - Total: 4,350 km^{2} (1,680 sq mi)

Population (2014 census)
  - Total: 330,548
  - Density: 76.0/km^{2} (197/sq mi)
- Time zone: UTC+0 (Guinea Standard Time)

Dubréka is a prefecture located in the Kindia Region of Guinea. The capital is Dubréka. The prefecture covers an area of 4,350 km^{2} and has a population of 330,548.

== Sub-prefectures ==
The prefecture is divided administratively into 7 sub-prefectures:

1. Dubréka-Centre
2. Badi
3. Falessade
4. Khorira
5. Ouassou
6. Tanéné
7. Tondon
