= Grand Mosque of Conakry =

Mosque in Conakry, Guinea

- Grande mosquée de Conakry

- Location within Guinea

Religion
- Affiliation: Islam
- Ecclesiastical or organisational status: Mosque
- Status: Active

Location
- Location: Conakry, Guinea
- Interactive map of Grand Mosque of Conakry
- Coordinates: 9.533175°N 13.684129°W

Architecture
- Type: Mosque
- Completed: 1982

Specifications
- Capacity: 12,500 worshippers
- Dome: 5
- Minaret: 4

The Grand Mosque of Conakry (French: Grande mosquée de Conakry / Mosquée Fayçal) is a mosque in Conakry, Guinea, located east of the Conakry Botanical Garden and beside the Donka Hospital.

== Overview ==
The mosque was built under Ahmed Sékou Touré with funding from King Fahd of Saudi Arabia. It opened in 1982. It is the fourth largest mosque in Africa and the largest in Sub-Saharan Africa. The mosque has 2,500 places on the upper level for women and 10,000 below for men. An additional 12,500 worshipers can be accommodated in the mosque's large esplanade. The gardens of the mosque contain the Camayanne Mausoleum, including the tombs of the national hero Samori Ture, Sékou Touré and Alfa Yaya.

The mosque suffers from a lack of maintenance, running water and electricity, despite a large donation of 20 billion GNF by the Kingdom of Saudi Arabia in 2003.

On Friday 2 October 2009 the bodies of 58 victims of the 28 September massacre were laid in the esplanade in front of the mosque. A large body of mourners and protesters were present, leading to clashes with police. The police responded with tear gas, which flooded the interior of the mosque.

== See also ==
- Islam in Guinea
- List of buildings and structures in Guinea
