= Guinean Press Agency =

Government-owned Guinean press agency

- French: Agence Guinéenne de Presse

Press agency overview
- Formed: April 1984

The Guinean Press Agency (French: Agence Guinéenne de Presse) (AGP) is a press agency in Guinea. It was run by the government under Sékou Touré and provided daily news updates to the other government officials and international diplomatic corps. A revitalized press emerged during the coup of April 1984. The agency is still active as of November 2015.
