= Jean-Marie Bayol =

French physician and colonial politician (1849–1905)

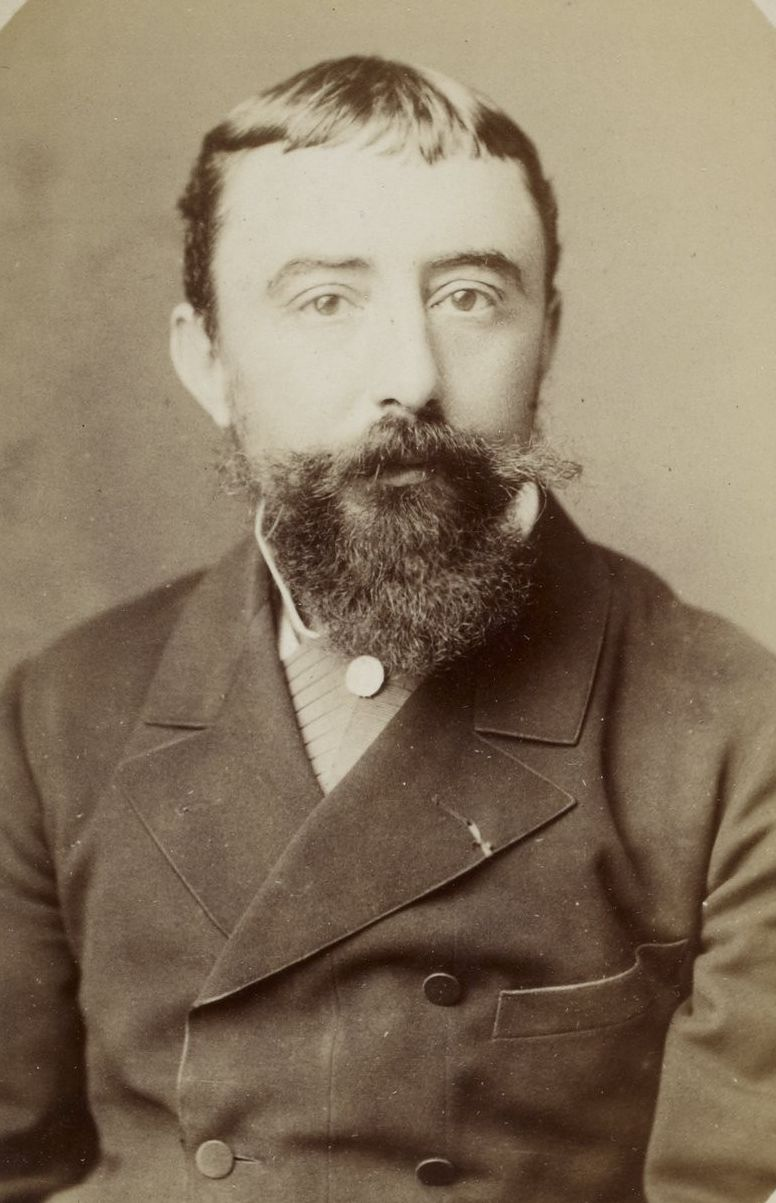
- Jean-Marie Bayol in 1883
- Born: 24 December 1849; Eyguières, Bouches du Rhone, France
- Died: 3 October 1905 (aged 55); Paris, France
- Occupations: Doctor, Colonial administrator
- Known for: Conakry city plan

Jean-Marie Bayol (24 December 1849 – 3 October 1905) was a French army doctor, colonial administrator and politician.

== Early years ==
Jean-Marie Bayol was born on 24 December 1849 in Eyguières, Bouches du Rhone, France. He studied medicine in Montpellier, then joined the naval health department in 1869. He was given his doctorate in 1874. He was assigned to the marine artillery.

Bayol's first assignment was on the Venus, which visited the coast of West Africa between 1875 and 1876. He undertook some minor explorations of the Como and Romboé tributaries of the Gabon Estuary in 1878 and explored the Crique Obelo to its source. In 1879 he was made a first-class naval doctor. In 1880 he was assigned by Senegal Governor Louis Brière de l'Isle to Captain Joseph Gallieni's expedition in the Upper Niger region. He was give the title of second in command.

== Explorer ==
Bayol left the naval health service after the Gallieni expedition and joined the colonial administration. In 1881-1882 Bayol and the artist and photographer Ernest Noirot explored part of the Rivières du Sud region of Senegal, which roughly corresponded to modern Guinea. They left on 4 May 1881 on a journey that took them to Fouta Djallon and Bambouk. The expedition aimed to promote trade with the French as an alternative to existing arrangements with British traders in Freetown, Sierra Leone. Bayol found a still-independent theocratic state in the Imamate of Futa Jallon. In July 1881 a treaty between France and Fouta Jallon was signed at Douhol-Fella by the almami Ibrahim Sory, where the French gained various commercial rights in exchange for an annual subsidy of 2,000 francs. The Almamis of Futa Jallon, Ibrahima and Amadou, sent an embassy of five notables that accompanied Bayol and Noirot on their return journey to France in January 1882.

Bayol was assigned a new mission to the Bambara kingdom of Kaarta, leaving Kayes on 23 December 1882. He had to turn back at Touba due to threats from Toucouleur warriors. Returning to Bafoulabé he explored the Guinina and Bamako regions. He left Bamako on 13 March 1883 and again traveled east towards the region near Timbuktu. He signed a treaty with the formerly hostile Bambara chiefs. He returned to Bamako on 27 May 1883.

== Colonial administrator ==
On 12 October 1883, Bayol was made lieutenant-governor of Senegal, in charge of the Rivières du Sud region. He undertook a further trip to the area in 1885 accompanied by the photographer Pierre Camille Victor Huas. In 1887 he was made governor of French Guinea. He drew up the plans for the city of Conakry. He undertook a diplomatic mission in Dahomey. He was a member of the commission to define the boundaries between the French and British possessions in West Africa. On 14 July 1889 he was made an Officer of the Legion of Honor.

Glele, King of Dahomey, attacked the protectorate of Porto-Novo in March 1889. Bayol was sent Abomey to negotiate, and was taken prisoner. The king ordered him to abandon Porto-Novo and Cotonou. Under duress, on 27 December 1889 Bayol signed an act that made Porto-Novo subject to Dahomey. After returning to Kotonou on 31 December 1889 he dispatched two companies of troops, which made contact with the Dahomey forces on 19 February 1890. However, he fell out with the Minister, who wanted to follow a defensive policy while Bayol advocated an advance on Abomey. In 1892 he was made an honorary governor and retired to Eyguières.

== Politician ==
Bayol entered politics and was elected councilor for Bouches-du-Rhône on 31 July 1898. He was elected to the Senate on 4 January 1903, where he joined the democratic left. He was involved in various measures related to the navy, army and marine corps. On 3 October 1905 he died in Paris.

== Bibliography ==
- Bayol, Jean (1880). Papiers du Docteur Bayol, médecin de la mission Gallieni dans le Haut-Sénégal et le Haut-Niger.
- Bayol, Jean (1881). Voyage au pays de Bamako sur le Haut-Niger (Soudan occidental).
- Bayol, Jean (1881). Papiers du Docteur Bayol, chargé de mission dans le Fouta-Djalon, 1881, puis au Soudan français, 1882-1883.
- Bayol, Jean (1888). Voyage en Sénégambie: Haut-Niger, Bambouck, Fouta-Djallon et Grand-Bélédougou 1880-1885. Baudoin.
- Bayol, Jean (1893). Les Dahoméens au Champ de Mars (Palais des Arts libéraux): moeurs et coutumes : exposition d'ethnographie coloniale. A. Herment.
- Laumann, E. M.; Bayol, Dr. Jean (1894). A la côte occidentale d'Afrique, par E.-M. Laumann,... Préface de Jean Bayol,... Firmin-Didot.
- Bayol, Jean (1903). Rapport fait au nom de la commission de la marine, chargée d'examiner la proposition de loi, adoptée par la chambre des députés, portant création d'un cadre de réserve pour les officiers généraux des différents corps de la marine autres que les officiers de vaisseau, par M. Bayol,... (5 février 1903.). Impr. de P. Mouillot.
- Bayol, Jean (1904). Rapport fait au nom de la Commission de la marine, chargée d'examiner le projet de loi portant organisation du corps de santé de la marine. P. Mouillot.
