= Coyah Prefecture =

Coordinates: 9°42′01″N 13°23′02″W

- Prefecture
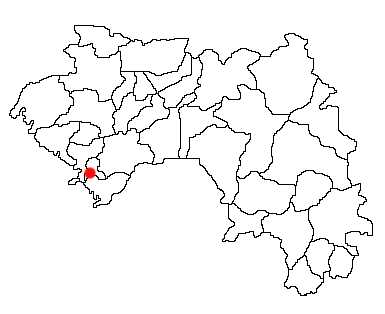
- Location of Coyah Prefecture and seat in Guinea
- Country: Guinea
- Region: Kindia Region
- Capital: Coyah

Area
  - Total: 1,275 km^{2} (492 sq mi)

Population (2014 census)
  - Total: 263,861
  - Density: 206.9/km^{2} (536.0/sq mi)
- Time zone: UTC+0 (Guinea Standard Time)

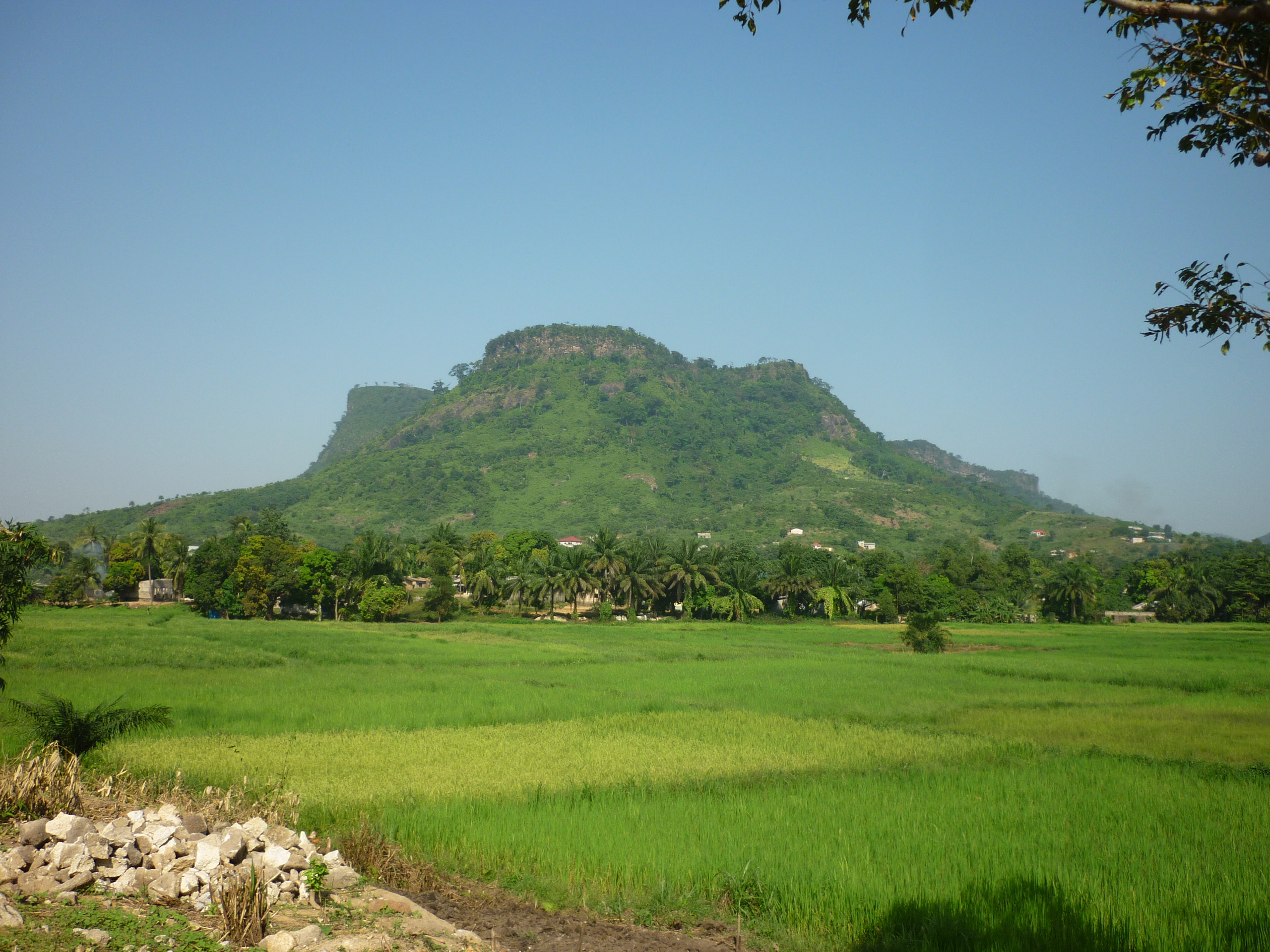
Mountain of Coyah

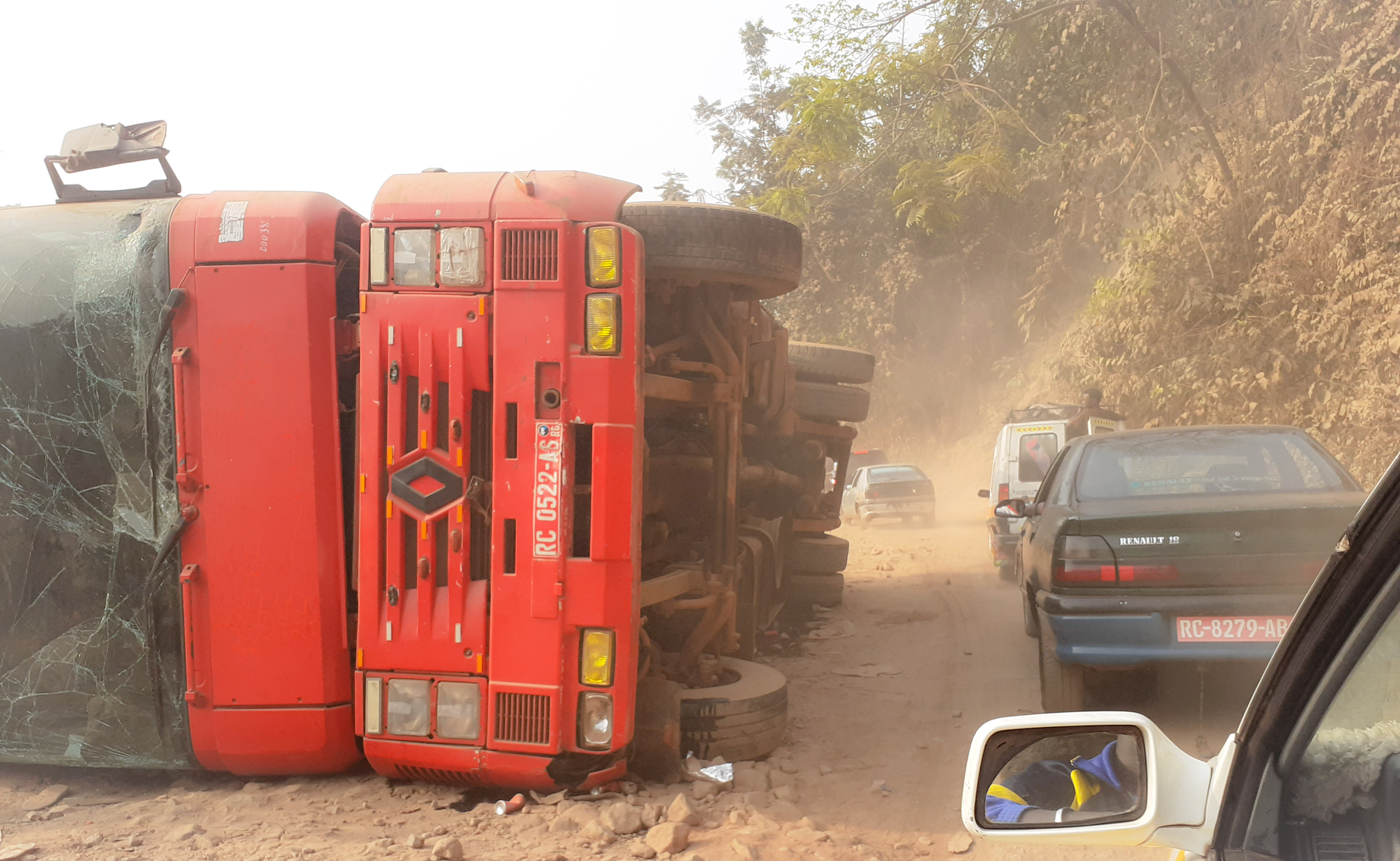
Truck accident on Kaka road

Coyah is a prefecture located in the Kindia Region of Guinea. The capital is Coyah. The prefecture covers an area of 1,375 km² and has a population of 263,861.

== Sub-prefectures ==
The prefecture is divided administratively into four sub-prefectures:

1. Coyah-Centre
2. Kouriah
3. Manéah
4. Wonkifong
