= Kindia Region =

Region of Guinea

Coordinates: 10°15′N 13°0′W

Kindia
- Region
- Kindia Region in Guinea
- Country: Guinea
- Capital: Kindia

Area
  - Total: 28,873 km^{2} (11,148 sq mi)

Population (2025 census)
  - Total: 2,275,620
  - Density: 78.815/km^{2} (204.13/sq mi)
- HDI (2023): 0.493 low · 2nd of 8

Kindia Region (Pular: 𞤁𞤭𞥅𞤱𞤢𞤤 𞤑𞤭𞤲𞤣𞤭𞤴𞤢𞥄) is a region located in western Guinea. It is bordered by the country of Sierra Leone and the Guinean regions of Conakry, Labé, Mamou, and Boké.

== Administrative divisions ==
Kindia Region is divided into five prefectures; which are further sub-divided into 45 sub-prefectures:

- Coyah Prefecture (4 sub-prefectures)
- Dubréka Prefecture (7 sub-prefectures)
- Forécariah Prefecture (10 sub-prefectures)
- Kindia Prefecture (10 sub-prefectures)
- Télimélé Prefecture (14 sub-prefectures)
