= Timeline of Conakry =

The following is a timeline of the history of the city of Conakry, Guinea.

== Prior to 20th century ==
- 1885 – French in power on Tombo Island.
- 1891 – Conakry becomes capital of French colonial Riviéres du Sud.
- 1893 – Conakry becomes part of colonial French Guinea.

== 20th century ==
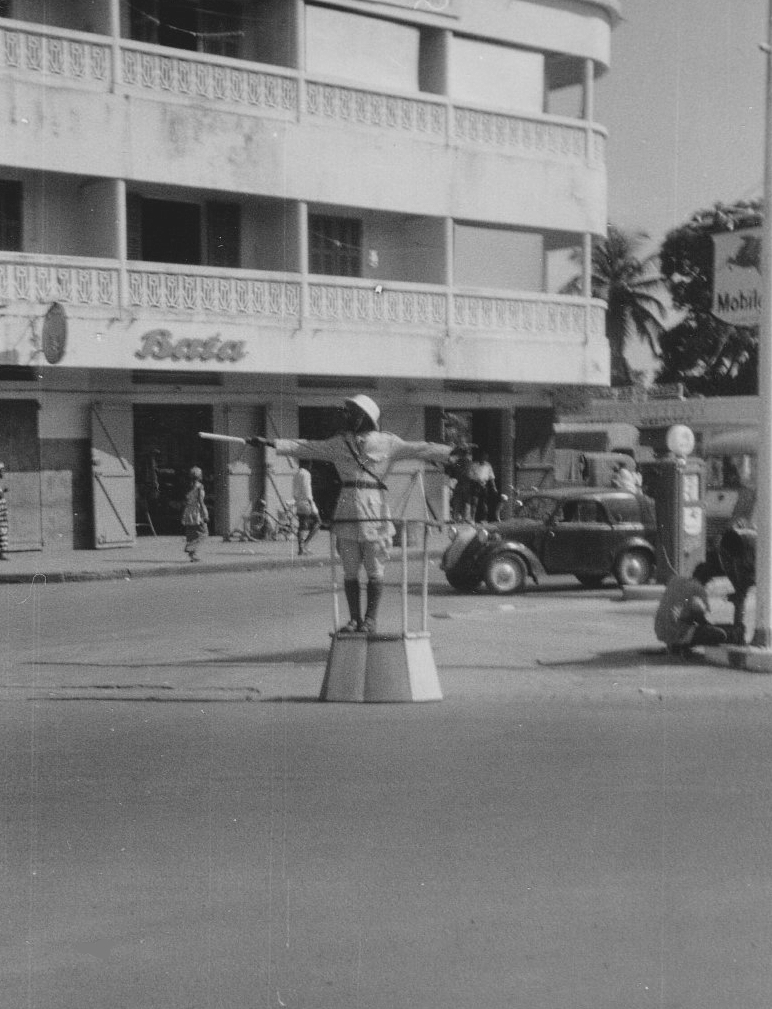
Conakry, 1956

- 1904 – Conakry municipality established.
- 1914 – Kankan-Conakry railway begins operating.
- 1928 – Cathedrale Sainte-Marie construction begins.
- 1937 – La Douce Parisette (musical group) active.
- 1943 – Population: 21,217 city; 5,586 suburbs.
- 1947 – Franco-Guinean Union (political party) headquartered in city.
- 1948 – Population: 30,000 city.
- 1951 – Hafia Football Club formed.
- 1954 – Hotel de France in business.
- 1955 – Catholic Metropolitan Archdiocese of Conakry established.
- 1956 – Ahmed Sékou Touré elected mayor.
- 1958
  - City becomes part of independent Guinea.
  - Population: 78,388 city.
  - Area of city: 2,000 hectares.
- 1959 – Donka Hospital built.
- 1960
  - Camp Boiro concentration camp begins operating.
  - Sandervalia National Museum established.
- 1960s – Bembeya Jazz band active.
- 1961 – Horoya newspaper begins publication.
- 1962
  - Polytechnical Institute of Conakry established.
  - Stade du 28 Septembre opens.
- 1964
  - Quinzaines Artistiques cultural festival begins.
  - Hotel Palm Camayenne in business.
  - Population: 175,000 urban agglomeration (including city).
- 1966 – Palais du Peuple built.
- 1967 – Population: 197,267 urban agglomeration (estimate).
- 1970 – 22 November: Portuguese invasion of Guinea-Conakry.
- 1971
  - January: Hanging of government officials on 8 November Bridge.
  - Monument du 22 Novembre 1970 erected.
- 1973 – 20 January: Assassination of Bissau-Guinean revolutionary Amílcar Cabral.
- 1975 – Horoya Athlétique Club formed.
- 1982 – Conakry Grand Mosque opens.
- 1983
  - Population: 100,000 city.
  - Area of city: 6,900 hectares.
- 1984 – March: Funeral of Ahmed Sékou Touré.
- 1985 – Conakry International Airport terminal built.
- 1991 – City administration sectioned into 5 communes: Dixinn, Kaloum, Matam, Matoto, Ratoma.
- 1992 – Le Lynx satirical newspaper begins publication.
- 1998 – Presidential Palace rebuilt.
- 1999 – Hotel Mariador Palace in business.

== 21st century ==
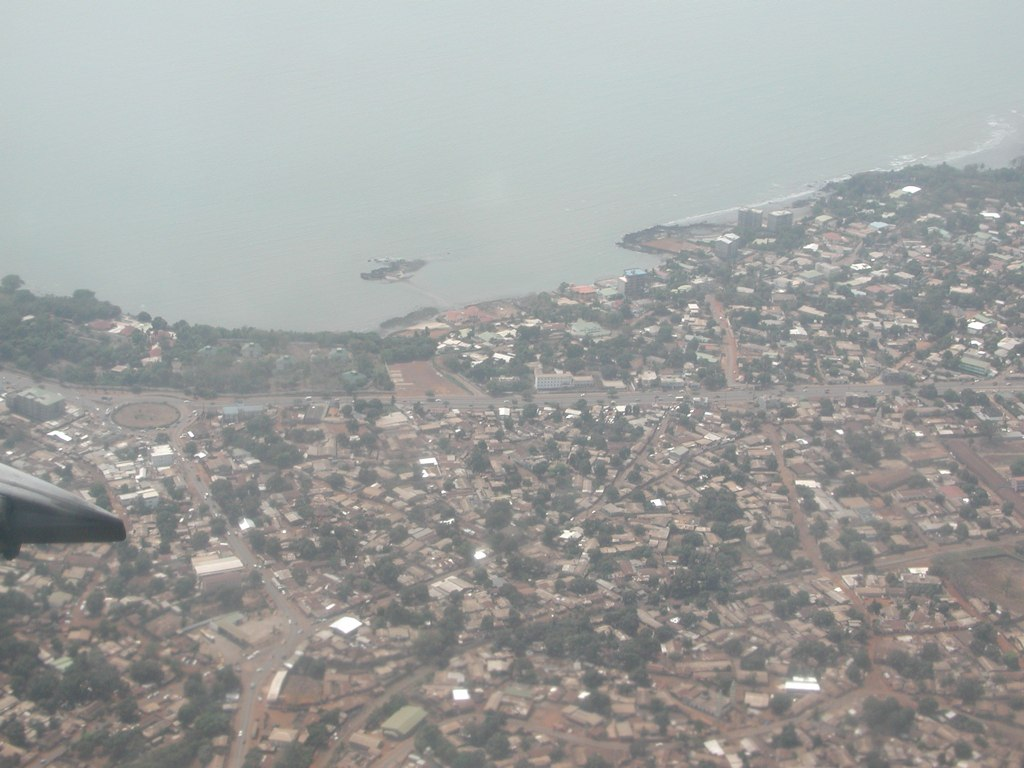
Aerial view of Conakry, 2004

- 2004 – Maison du Livre (bookshop) in business.
- 2007 – January–February: 2007 Guinean general strike.
- 2008
  - 26 September: Funeral of Lansana Conté.
  - 23 December: 2008 Guinean coup d'état.
- 2009 – 28 September: 2009 Guinea protest and crackdown.
- 2010 – September: Pre-election unrest.
- 2011
  - Nongo Stadium built.
  - Population: 1,786,000 (urban agglomeration).
- 2014
  - March: Conakry regional governor Sékou Resco Camara leaves office.
  - Population: 1,659,785.
- 2017 – City named World Book Capital by UNESCO
- 2021
- 5 September – 2021 Guinean coup d'état.

== See also ==
- List of Conakry mayors and other local officials (in French)
- History of Guinea
- Politics of Guinea

== Bibliography ==
in English

- Odile Goerg (1998). "From Hill Station (Freetown) to Downtown Conakry (First Ward): Comparing French and British Approaches to Segregation in Colonial Cities at the Beginning of the Twentieth Century". Canadian Journal of African Studies. 32 (1): 1–31. doi:10.2307/486222. JSTOR 486222.
- Nicole D. Anderson (2003). "Conakry, Guinea". In Paul Tiyambe Zeleza and Dickson Eyoh (ed.). Encyclopaedia of Twentieth-Century African History. Routledge. ISBN 978-1-134-56584-9.
- Odile Goerg (2005). "Conakry". In Kevin Shillington (ed.). Encyclopedia of African History. Fitzroy Dearborn. ISBN 978-1-135-45670-2.
- Odile Goerg (2006). "Chieftainships between Past and Present: From City to Suburb and Back in Colonial Conakry, 1890s-1950s". Africa Today. 52 (4): 3–27. doi:10.1353/at.2006.0044. JSTOR 4187737. S2CID 143660664.
- "Guinea: Conakry". West Africa. Lonely Planet. 2009. pp. 401+. ISBN 978-1-74104-821-6.
- Odile Goerg (2011), "Conakry", in Simon Bekker and Goran Therborn (ed.), Capital Cities in Africa: Power and Powerlessness, Dakar: Council for the Development of Social Science Research in Africa, ISBN 978-2-8697-8495-6, archived from the original on 2016-03-04
- Joschka Philipps (2013). "Youth gangs and urban political protests: a relational perspective on Conakry's 'Axis of Evil'". In Brigit Obrist; et al. (eds.). Living the City in Africa: Processes of Invention and Intervention. Lit Verlag. ISBN 978-3-643-80152-4.

in French

- Ch. Brossard, ed. (1906). "Afrique occidentale française: Guinée française: Villes principales: Conakry". Colonies françaises. Géographie pittoresque et monumentale de la France (in French). Paris: Flammarion. hdl:2027/mdp.39015005579753. (+ table of contents)
- Odile Goerg (1985). "Conakry: un modèle de ville coloniale française? Règlements fonciers et urbanisme, de 1885 aux années 1920". Cahiers d'Études africaines (in French). 25 (99): 309–335. doi:10.3406/cea.1985.1733 – via Persee.fr.
- Julie Kébé-Gangneux (2016). "Quand les citadins font et défont la ville à Conakry: le droit à l'espace" [When citizens assemble and disassemble the city in Conakry: the right to space]. Environnement Urbain (in French). 10. Montreal: INRS-Urbanisation, Culture et Société – via Revues.org.
