= Aboubacar Sylla =

Aboubacar Sylla may refer to:

- Aboubacar Sylla (footballer, born 1983), Guinean international football striker
- Aboubacar Sylla (footballer, born 1993), Guinean international football midfielder
- Aboubacar Adama Sylla, Guinean deputy in the National Assembly of Guinea

== See also ==
- Abu Bakar Sillah (born 1989), Australian football defender
