= Dixinn =

- Sub-prefecture and town
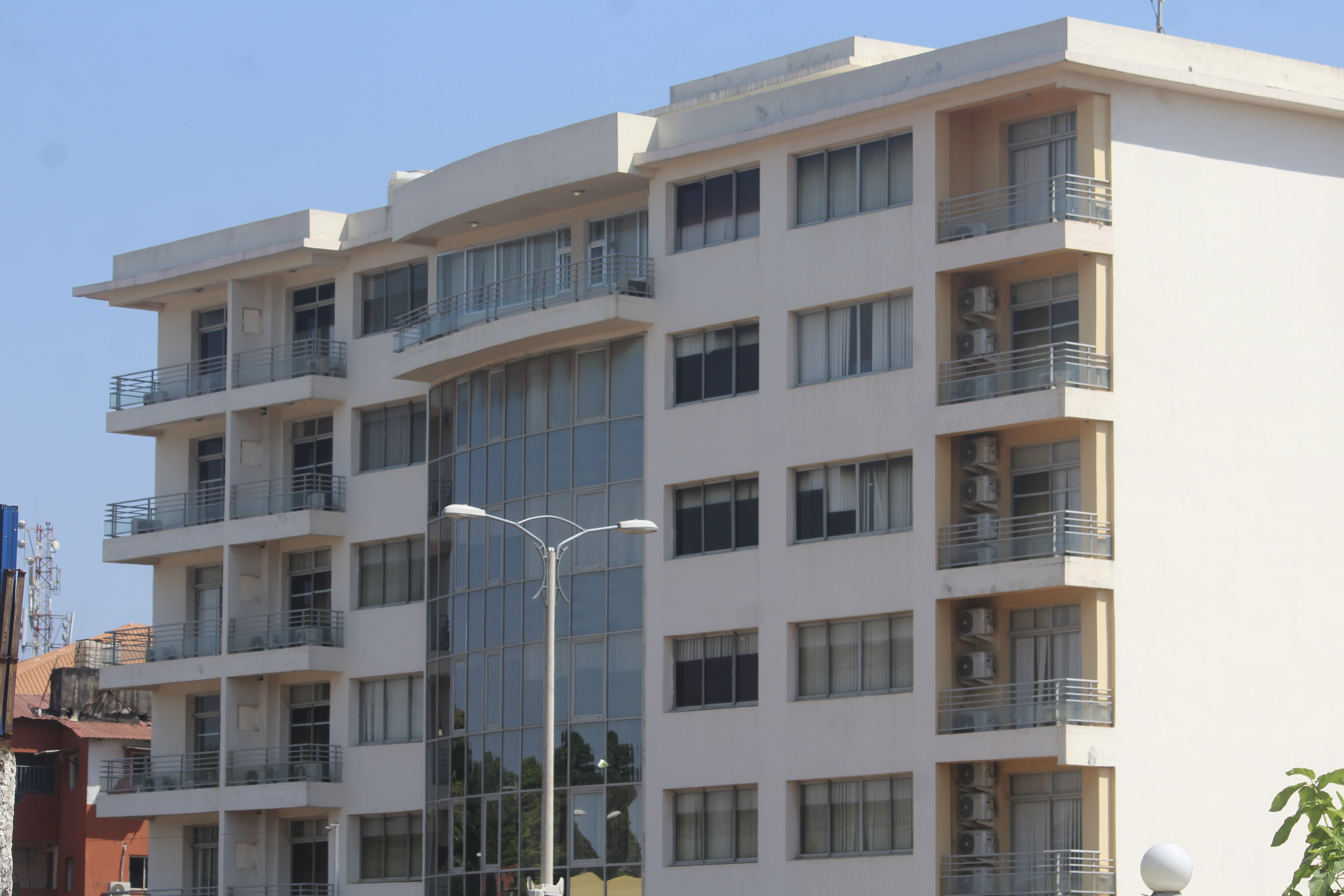

- Location in Guinea
- Coordinates: 9°33′4″N 13°40′23″W
- Country: Guinea
- Region: Conakry Region

Area
  - Total: 2.98 sq mi (7.71 km^{2})

Population (mid 2025 Census)
  - Total: 186,553
  - Density: 62,700/sq mi (24,200/km^{2})
- Time zone: UTC+0 (GMT)

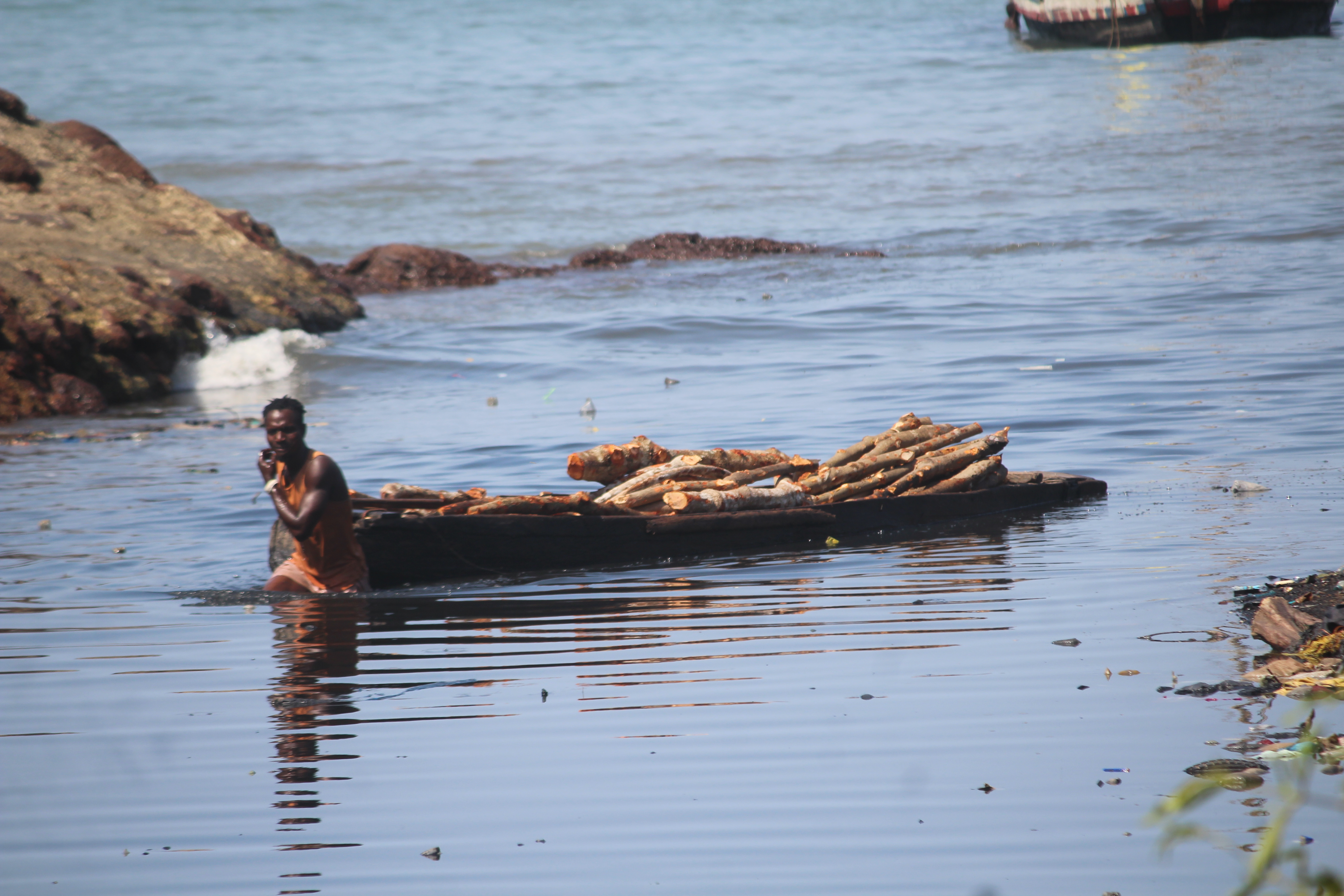
A boatman in Dixinn

Dixinn is an urban sub-prefecture (commune) in the Conakry Region of Guinea and one of thirteen in the capital Conakry. It is situated on the west side of the Conakry peninsula, directly to the northeast of the city centre at Kaloum. As of 2014 it had a population of 137,287 people; at the 1 July 2025 Census this had grown to 186,553 (preliminary census return).

The University of Conakry, Donka Hospital, Conakry Botanical Garden, the Grand Mosque of Conakry and Camp Boiro are located in Dixinn.
