= Sans fil =

Sans fil may refer to:

- Quartier Sans fil (Guinea)

== See also ==
- Wireless communication
