= Matam, Guinea =

Matam
- Sub-prefecture
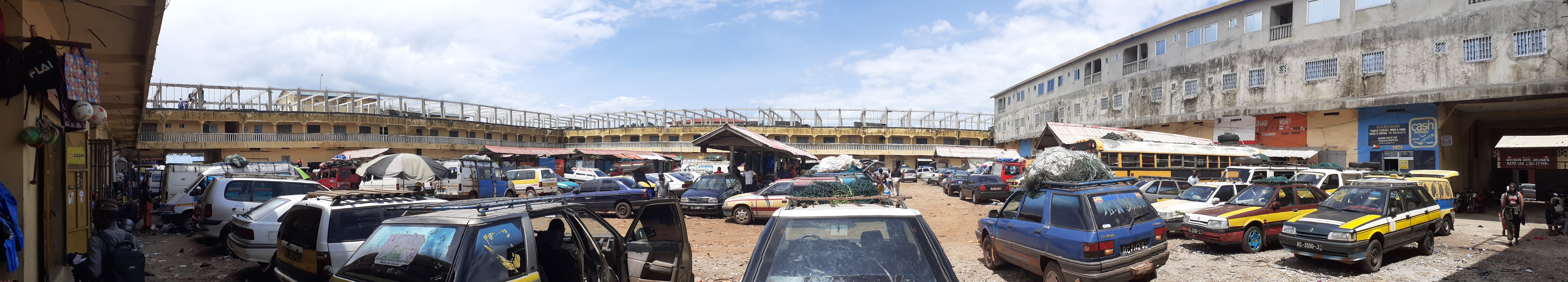

- Flag

- Location in Guinea
- Coordinates: 9°34′N 13°38′W
- Country: Guinea
- Region: Conakry Region

Area
  - Total: 2.39 sq mi (6.20 km^{2})

Population (2014)
  - Total: 177,271
  - Density: 74,100/sq mi (28,600/km^{2})
- Time zone: UTC+0 (GMT)

Matam is an urban sub-prefecture (commune) in the Conakry Region of Guinea and one of thirteen in the capital Conakry. Situated on the east coast of the Conakry peninsula (and immediately adjacent to the city centre at Kaloum), it covers an area of 6.2 km^{2} and at the 2014 Census it had a population of 143,658 people; at the 1 July 2025 Census the population had risen to 177,271 (preliminary census return).
