= Aboubacar Adama Sylla =

Guinean politician

Deputy in the National Assembly (Guinea), Rapporteur General
- President: Alpha Conde
- Preceded by: Mohamed Momo Camara
- Constituency: Matoto

Personal details
- Party: Rally of the Guinean People

Aboubacar Adama Sylla is a Guinean politician who represents the constituency of Matoto, in the National Assembly (Guinea). He is a member of the Majority Rally of the Guinean People Party of former president Alpha Conde.
