= M'Mahawa Sylla =

Guinean army officer

Governor of Conakry
- Incumbent
- Assumed office 10 September 2021
- Preceded by: Mathurin Bangoura

Personal details
- Born: Guinea

Military service
- Allegiance: Guinea
- Branch/service: Republic of Guinea Armed Forces
- Years of service: 1985–present
- Rank: Brigadier general

M'Mahawa Sylla is a Guinean army officer.

She is the one and only woman to have reached the rank of general since the creation of the Guinean army in 1960.

Since September 10, 2021, she has been the governor of the city of Conakry.

== Education ==
M'Mahawa Sylla studied in Guinea and graduated with a higher education diploma in economics and management from the Gamal Abdel Nasser University of Conakry. She graduated from the CISD of the Higher Defense College in Beijing in 2014.

== Officer career ==
Captain of the Guinean women's handball team, M'Mahawa Sylla was chosen by the Guinean army to join the Sports Association of the Armed Forces of Guinea (Asfag) in 1985.

She participated in the United Nations mission in Côte d'Ivoire called ONUCI.

In 2013, she became a colonel in the army. From the end of 2017 to September 2021, she was the Deputy Secretary General of the National Defense Council.

== Governor ==
After the coup d'état of September 5, 2021 by the CNRD, Brigadier General M'Mahawa Sylla was appointed to the post of governor of the city of Conakry, replacing General Mathurin Bangoura, in office since 2016.

== Awards and recognition ==
- 2021: First female brigadier general.
- 2021: First female governor of the city of Conakry.
- 2022: Grand Officer of the National Order of Merit.
