= French Guinea =

French colony in West Africa (1891-1958); now the country of Guinea

Coordinates: 9.5092°N 13.7122°W

French Guinea Guinée française (French)
- Constituent of French West Africa
- 1891–1958
- Flag

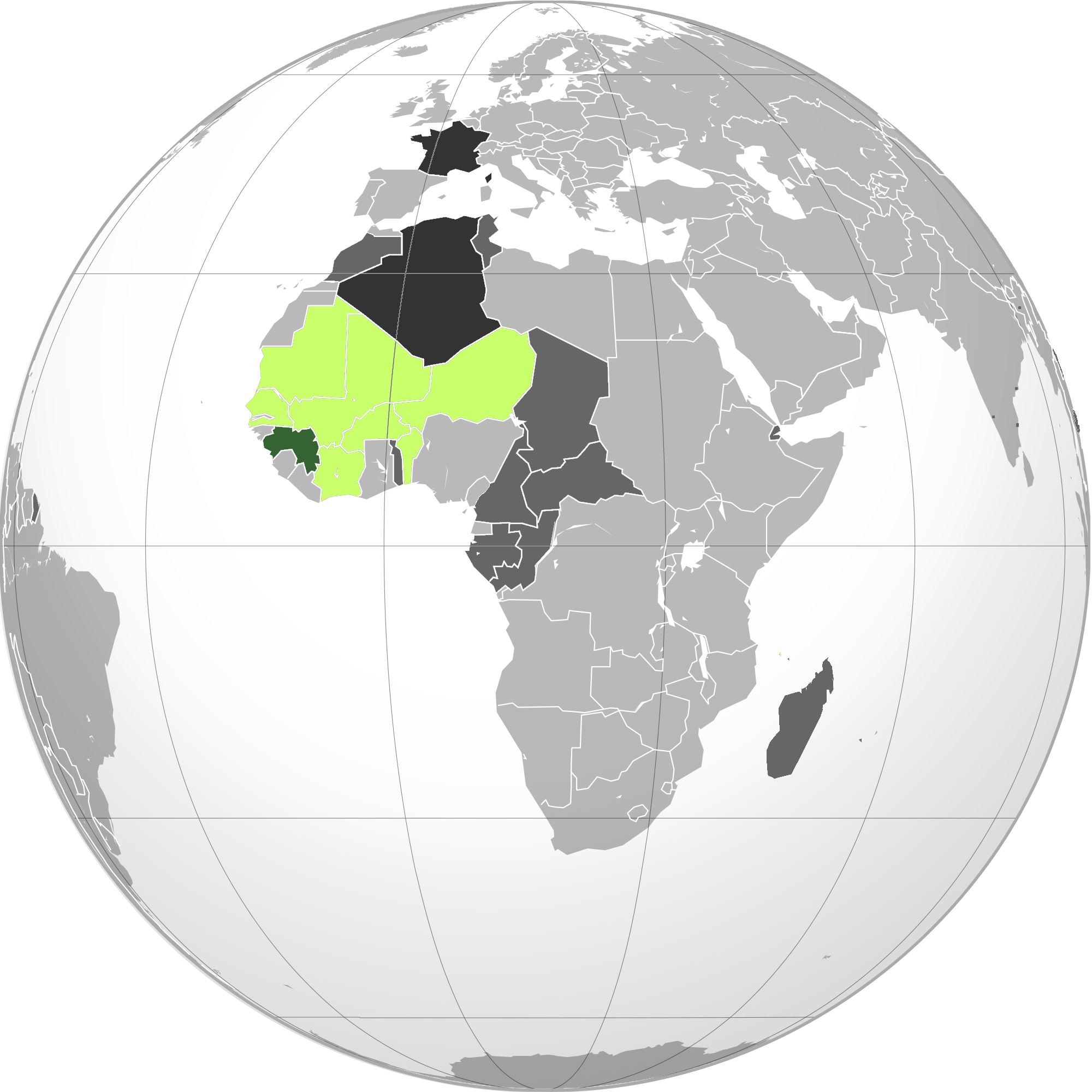
- Green: French Guinea; Lime: French West Africa; Dark gray: Other French possessions Darkest gray: French Republic

Anthem
- "La Marseillaise"
- Capital: Conakry
- Government
- Governor
  - 1891–1900: Noël Ballay
  - 1956–1958: Jean Ramadier
- History
  - Established: 1891
  - Independence: 2 October 1958
Preceded by	Succeeded by
Rivières du Sud	Guinea
- Today part of: Guinea

French Guinea (French: Guinée française) was a French colonial possession in West Africa. Its borders, while changed over time, were in 1958 those of the current independent nation of Guinea.

French Guinea was established by France in 1891, within the same borders as its previous colony known as Rivières du Sud (1882–1891). Prior to 1882, the coastal portions of French Guinea were part of the French colony of Senegal.

In 1891, Rivières du Sud was placed under the colonial lieutenant governor at Dakar, who had authority over the French coastal regions east to Porto-Novo (modern Benin). In 1894 Rivières du Sud, Côte d'Ivoire and Dahomey were separated into 'independent' colonies, with Rivières du Sud being renamed as the Colony of French Guinea. In 1895, French Guinea was made one of several dependent colonies and its Governor became one of several Lieutenant Governors who reported to a Governor-General in Dakar. In 1904, this federation of colonies was formalised as French West Africa. French Guinea, Senegal, Dahomey, Côte d'Ivoire and Upper Senegal and Niger, were each ruled by a lieutenant governor, under the Governor General in Dakar.

== Colonial history ==
Guinea was ruled by France until 1958. It became independent from France in 1958 following its voters' rejection of Charles de Gaulle's Constitution of 1958. At the time French Guinea was the only colony to reject the new constitution. French Guinea became the modern-day country of Guinea, keeping French as its official language.

== See also ==
- Guinea
- History of Guinea
- French West Africa
- List of French possessions and colonies
- Timeline of Conakry
