= Tombo Island =

Island in Guinea

Coordinates: 9.5100°N 13.7100°W

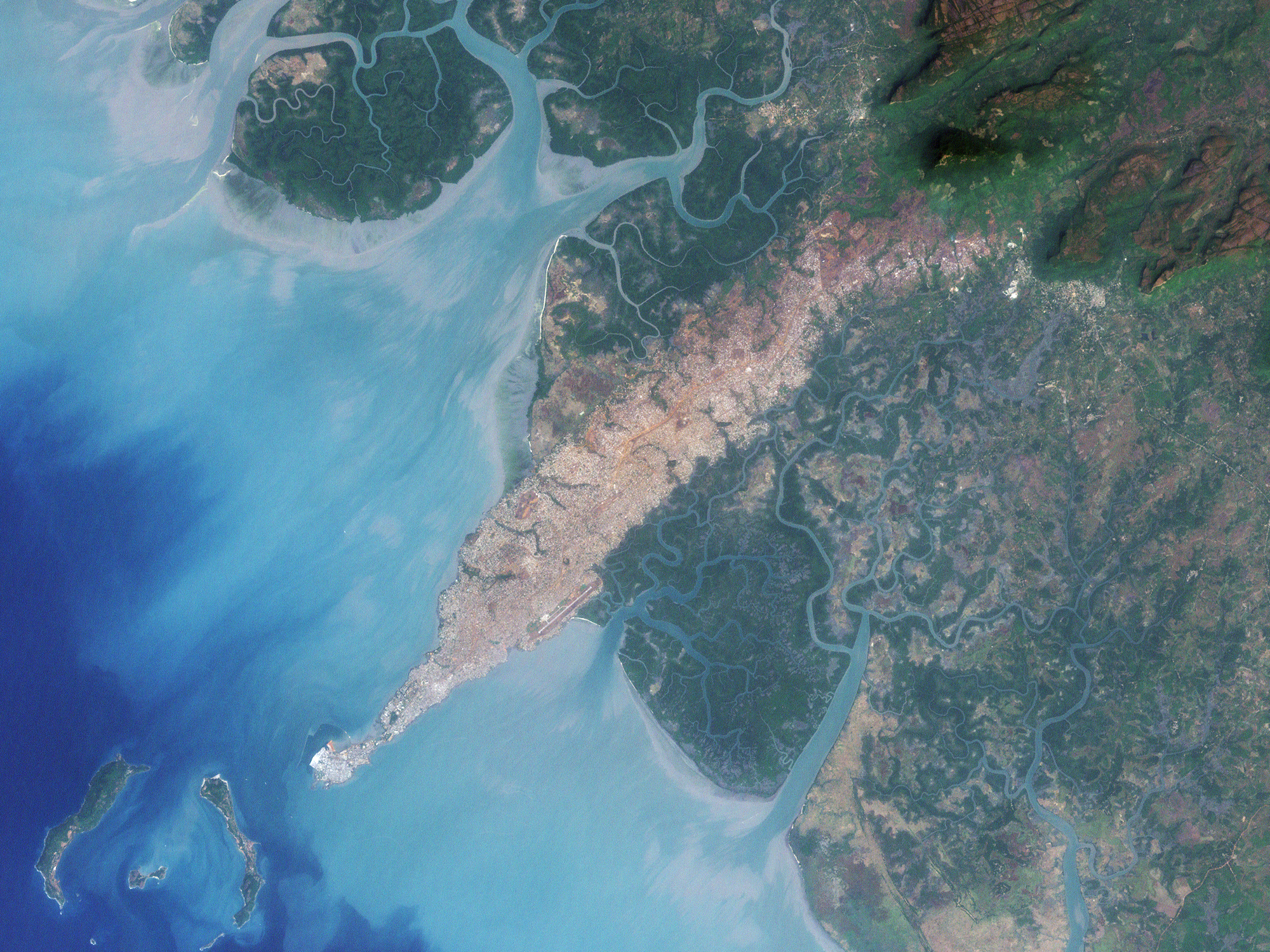
Tombo Island is at the end of the Kaloum Peninsula

Tombo Island is an island in the Atlantic Ocean at the tip of the Guinean Kaloum Peninsula, about 4 km (2.5 mi) east of the Îles de Los.

The capital Conakry was built on the island, which is the site of the old city of Conakry; the new colonial city is located at Kaloum. It is linked to the peninsula by a causeway.

The island was placed under a French protectorate by the king of Dubréka on 20 January 1880. This step was aimed to counter the English influence growing in the region. On 24 December 1885, the Germans renounced to be established on the Island of Tombo and obtain a territory at the border between Togo and Dahomey. The island became a French territory after its acquisition on 8 June 1889.

== See also ==
- Islands of Africa
