= Conakry Botanical Garden =

Botanical garden in Conakry, Guinea

Coordinates: 9.531°N 13.686°W

Conakry Grand Mosque from the botanical garden

Conakry Botanical Garden is a botanical garden in Conakry, Guinea. It is located in the Camayenne part of the city, with the Ambroise Paré Hospital to the south and Conakry Grand Mosque to the north. It is noted for its kapok trees.

== See also ==
- List of buildings and structures in Guinea
