= Conakry =

Capital and largest city of Guinea

Conakry: Kɔnakiri (Susu); ߞߐߣߊߞߙߌ߫ (N'Ko); 𞤑𞤮𞤲𞤢𞥄𞤳𞤭𞤪𞤭 (Fula)
- Capital city
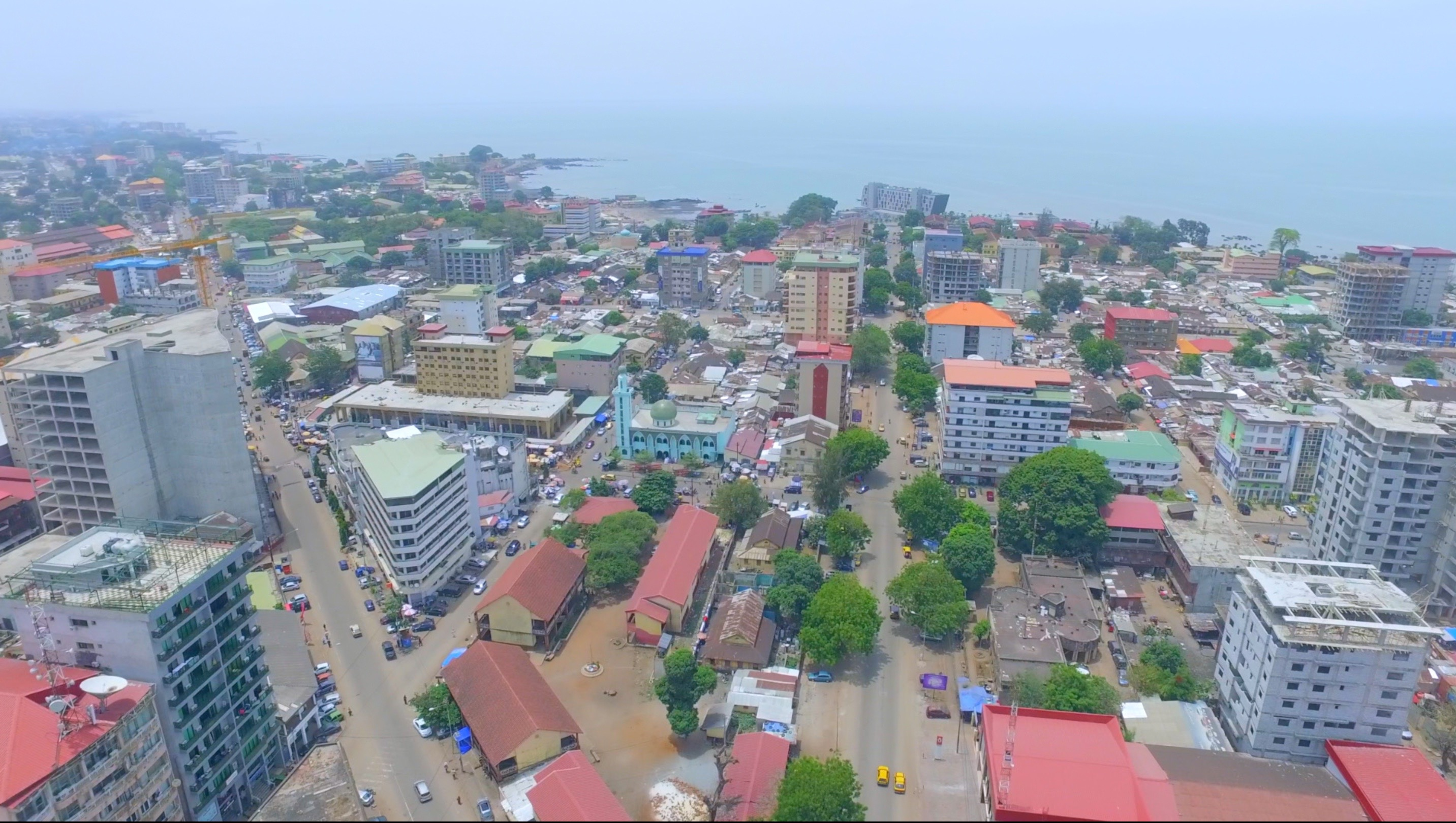
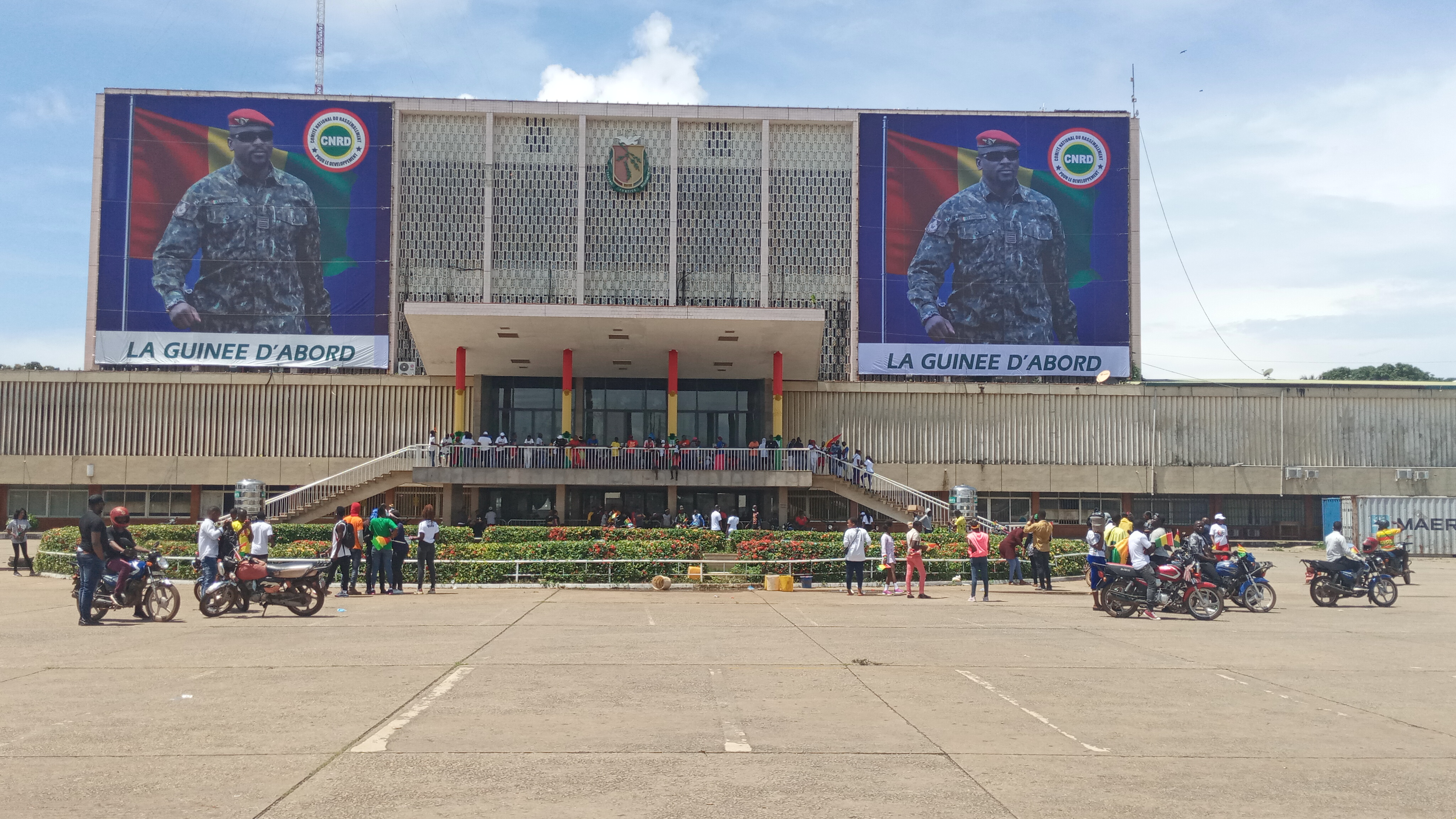
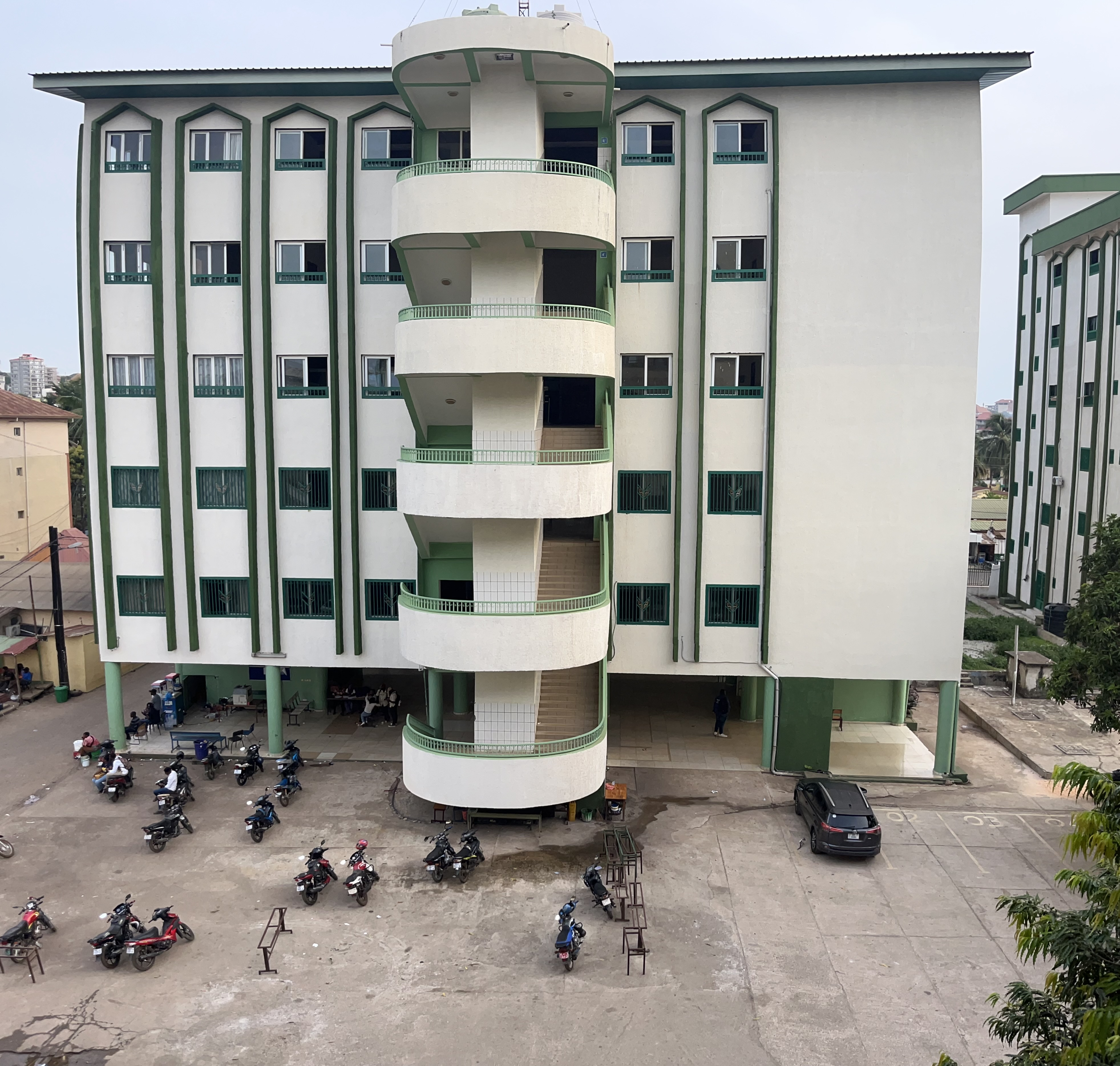
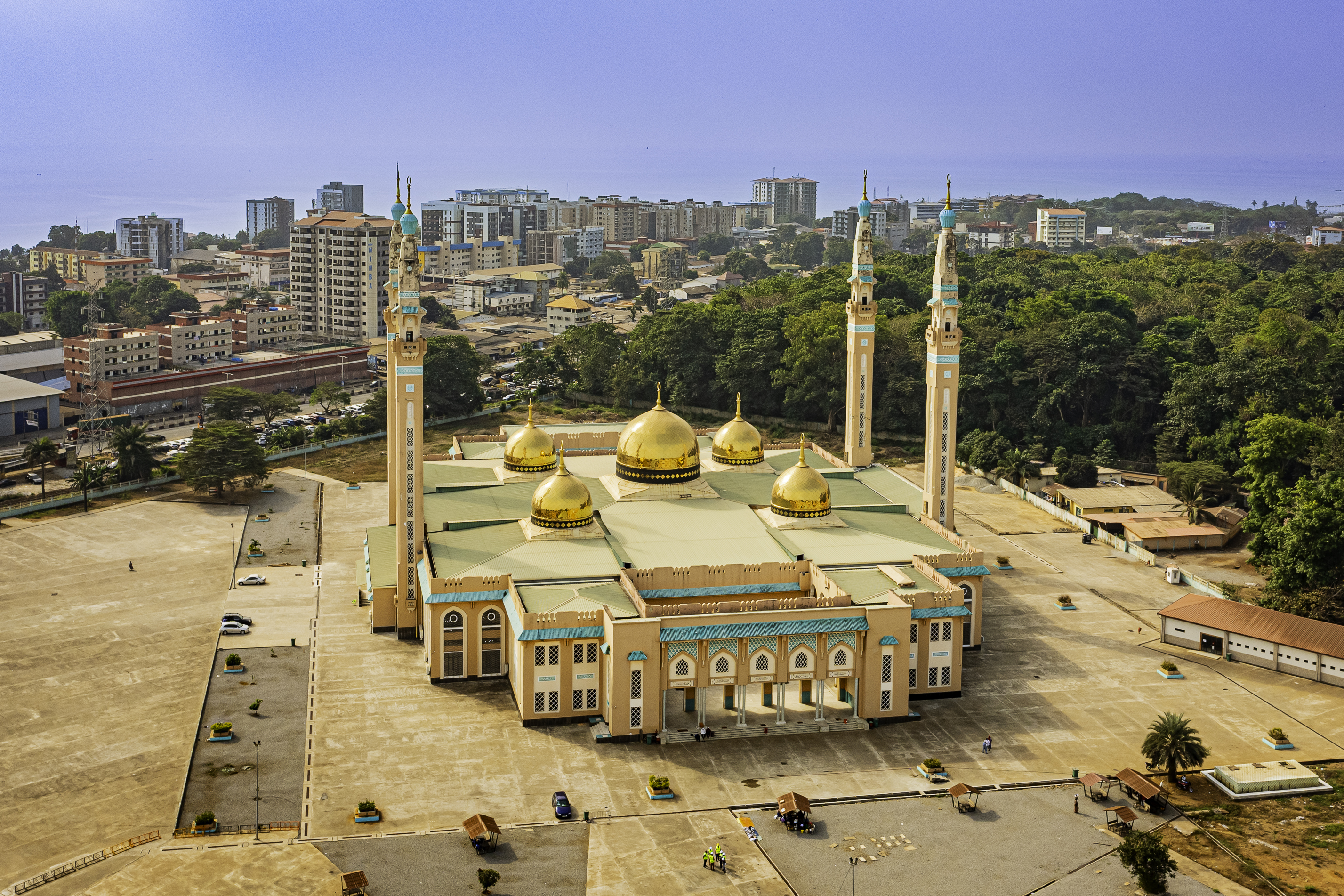
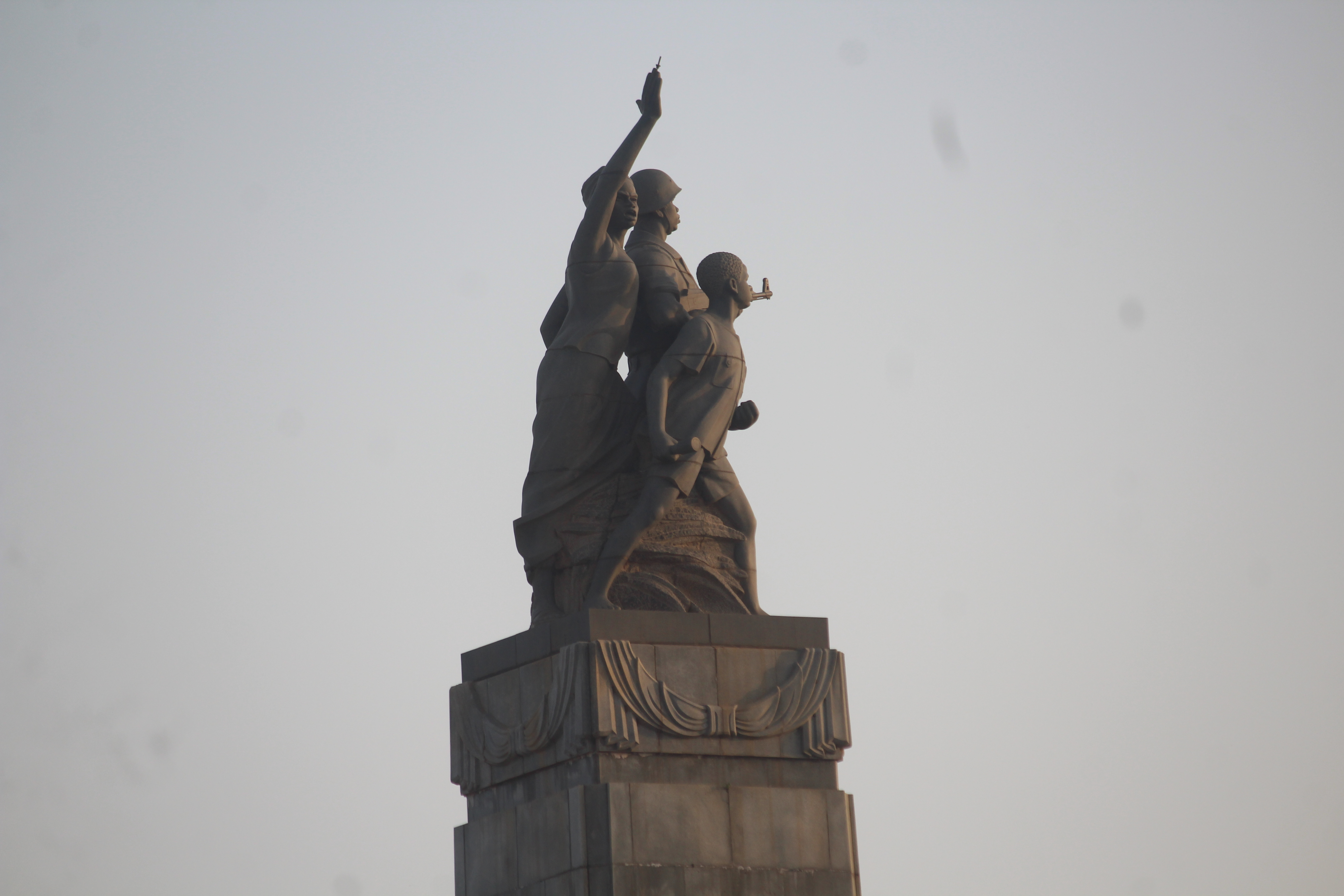
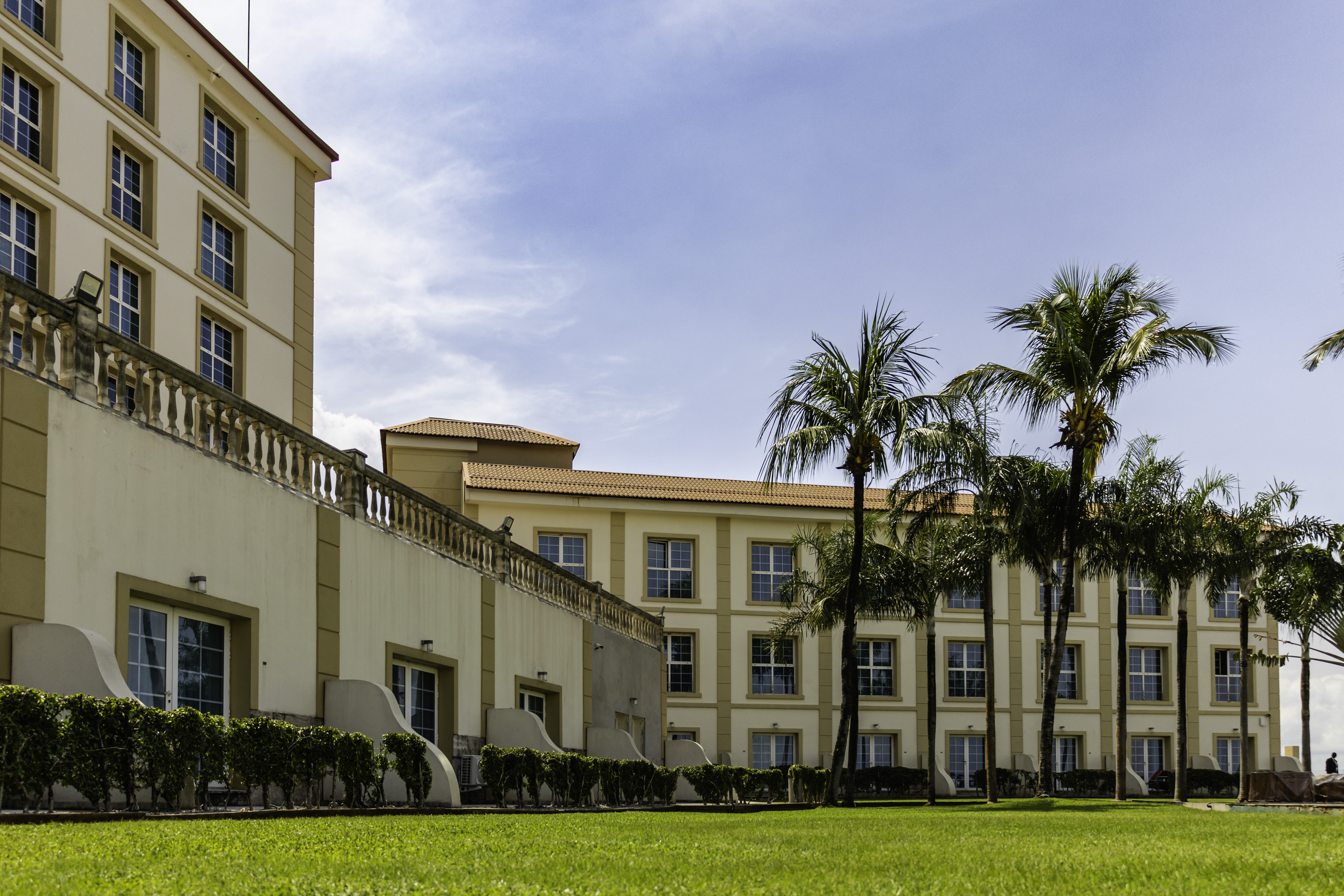
- View of Conakry Palais du Peuple Kofi Annan University Grand Mosque of Conakry Monument du 22 Novembre 1970 Palm Camayenne Hotel

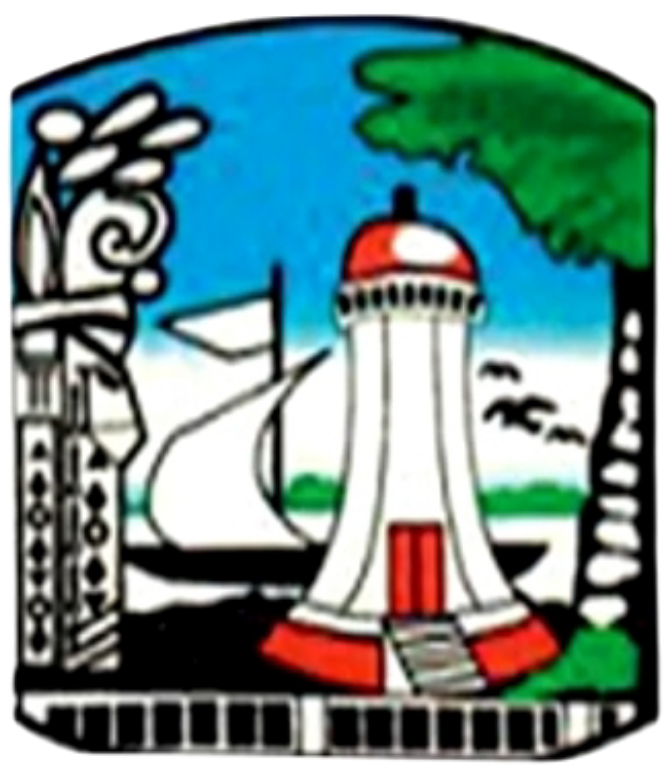
- Seal

- Conakry Region in Guinea

- Location within Guinea Location within Africa
- Coordinates: 09°30′33″N 13°42′44″W
- Country: Guinea
- Region: Conakry Region

Government
  - Governor: M'Mahawa Sylla

Area
  - Total: 450 km^{2} (170 sq mi)
- Elevation: 8.8 m (29 ft)

Population (2025 census)
  - Total: 3,407,327
  - Rank: 1st
  - Density: 7,600/km^{2} (20,000/sq mi)
- Demonym: Conakryka
- Time zone: UTC+00:00 (GMT)
- HDI (2023): 0.697 medium· 1st of 8

Conakry (/ˈkɒnəkri/ KON-ə-kree, French: [kɔnakʁi]; Susu: Kɔnakiri; N'Ko: ߞߐߣߊߞߙߌ߫, romanized: Kɔnakrí; Fula: 𞤑𞤮𞤲𞤢𞥄𞤳𞤭𞤪𞤭, romanized: Konaakiri) is the capital and largest city of Guinea. A port city, it serves as the economic, financial and cultural centre of Guinea. Its population as of the 2025 Guinea census was 3,407,327, making it the largest city in Guinea and making up approximately one-fifth of the country's population.

== History ==
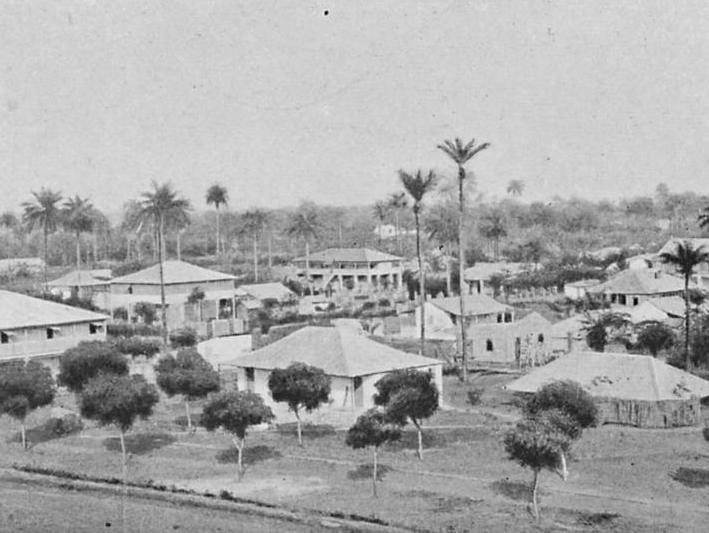
The city in 1912

Conakry was originally settled on the small Tombo Island and later spread to the neighboring Kaloum Peninsula, a 36-kilometer-long (22 mi) stretch of land 0.2 to 6 kilometers (1/8 to 3 3/4 mi) wide. The city was essentially founded after Britain ceded the island to France in 1887. In 1885, the two island villages of Conakry and Boubinet had fewer than 500 inhabitants. Conakry became the capital of French Guinea in 1904, and prospered as an export port, particularly after a railway (now closed) to Kankan opened up the interior of the country for the large-scale export of groundnut.

In the decades after Guinea gained independence in 1958, the population of Conakry boomed, from 50,000 inhabitants in 1958 to 600,000 in 1980 to more than 3.4 million today. The city's small land area and relative isolation from the mainland, while an advantage to its colonial founders, has created an infrastructural burden since independence.

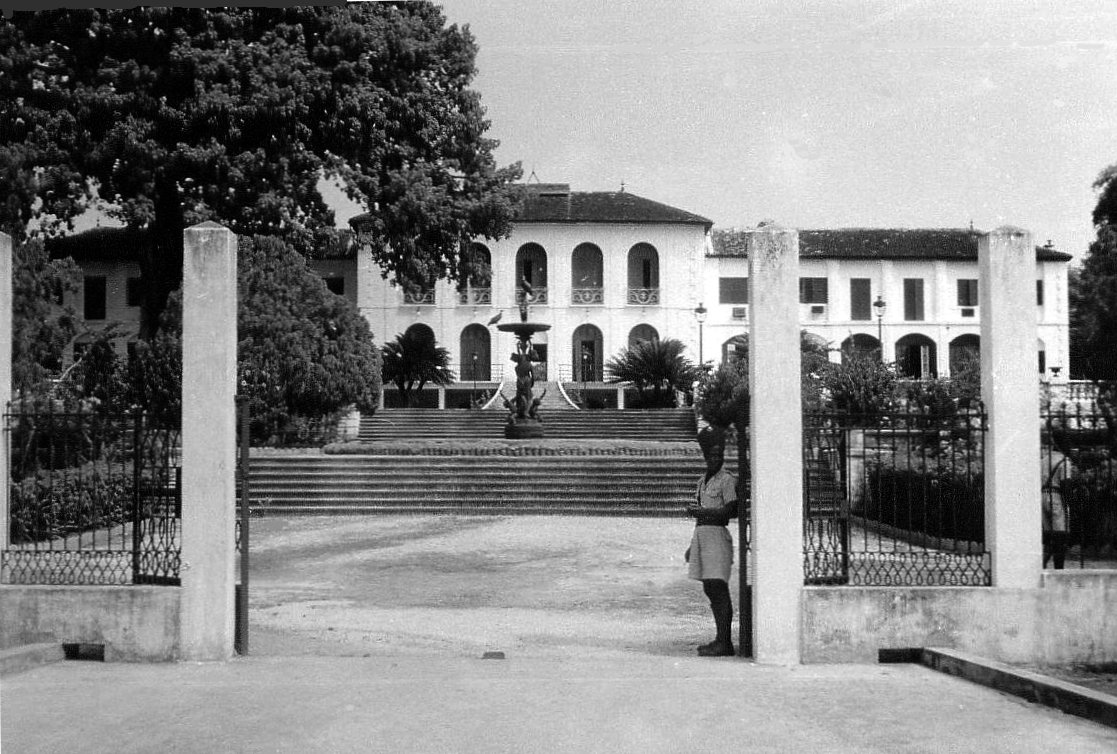
Conakry – French Governor's Palace in 1956

In 1970, conflict between Portuguese forces and the belligerent PAIGC independence campaigners in neighbouring Portuguese Guinea (now Guinea-Bissau) spilled into the Republic of Guinea when a group of 350 Portuguese troops and Guinean loyalists landed near the capital Conakry, attacked the city and freed 26 Portuguese prisoners of war held by the PAIGC before retreating, having failed to overthrow the government or kill the PAIGC leadership.

Camp Boiro, a feared concentration camp during the rule of Sekou Touré, was located in Conakry.

According to human rights groups, 157 people died during the 2009 Guinean protests when the military junta opened fire against tens of thousands of protesters in the city on 28 September 2009.

== Geography ==
Originally situated on Tombo Island, one of the Îles de Los, the capital was subsequently moved to the neighbouring tip of the Kaloum peninsula, and the expanding urban area has since spread northeastwards to occupy the whole of the peninsula.

=== Climate ===
Conakry, Guinea

Climate chart (precipitation, max. and min. temperature)
J	F	M	A	M	J	J	A	S	O	N	D
1 32 19	1 33 20	3 33 21	22 34 22	137 33 21	396 32 20	1130 30 20	1104 30 21	617 31 21	295 31 20	70 32 21	8 32 20
- █ Average max. and min. temperatures in °C
- █ Precipitation totals in mm
- Source: HK
Imperial conversion
J	F	M	A	M	J	J	A	S	O	N	D
0 90 66	0 92 68	0.1 92 70	0.9 92 72	5.4 92 69	16 89 68	44 86 69	43 86 69	24 87 69	12 88 69	2.8 90 70	0.3 90 68
- █ Average max. and min. temperatures in °F
- █ Precipitation totals in inches

According to Köppen climate classification, Conakry features a tropical monsoon climate (Köppen climate classification: Am). Conakry features a wet season and a dry season. Like most of West Africa, Conakry's dry season is dominated by the harmattan wind between December and April. As a result, almost no rain falls in the city during these months.

Compared to most of West Africa, Conakry's wet season sees an extraordinary amount of rainfall, averaging more than 1,100 millimetres (43 in) in both July and August. As a result, Conakry's average annual rainfall totals nearly 3,800 millimetres (150 in). However, the dry season is still dry, with January and February only receiving 1 millimetre (0 in) of rainfall on average. Sunshine is lower in the wet season than the dry season, with August receiving the least sunshine and March receiving the most.

Climate data for Conakry (1991–2020)
Month	Jan	Feb	Mar	Apr	May	Jun	Jul	Aug	Sep	Oct	Nov	Dec	Year
Mean daily maximum °C (°F)	31.6 (88.9)	31.9 (89.4)	32.2 (90.0)	32.3 (90.1)	31.9 (89.4)	30.3 (86.5)	28.8 (83.8)	28.4 (83.1)	29.5 (85.1)	30.4 (86.7)	31.4 (88.5)	31.8 (89.2)	30.9 (87.6)
Daily mean °C (°F)	26.9 (80.4)	27.6 (81.7)	28.2 (82.8)	28.4 (83.1)	28.3 (82.9)	27.0 (80.6)	25.9 (78.6)	25.7 (78.3)	26.3 (79.3)	26.8 (80.2)	27.7 (81.9)	27.6 (81.7)	27.2 (81.0)
Mean daily minimum °C (°F)	22.3 (72.1)	23.2 (73.8)	24.1 (75.4)	24.6 (76.3)	24.6 (76.3)	23.6 (74.5)	23.1 (73.6)	23.1 (73.6)	23.2 (73.8)	23.2 (73.8)	24.1 (75.4)	23.3 (73.9)	23.5 (74.3)
Average precipitation mm (inches)	2.5 (0.10)	1.4 (0.06)	3.4 (0.13)	17.9 (0.70)	112.5 (4.43)	433.6 (17.07)	1,082.6 (42.62)	1,142.1 (44.96)	555.2 (21.86)	293.2 (11.54)	80.0 (3.15)	5.5 (0.22)	3,729.9 (146.85)
Average precipitation days (≥ 1.0 mm)	0.3	0.2	0.5	2.0	8.5	19.2	26.4	28.2	23.0	17.0	5.2	0.4	130.9
Average relative humidity (%)	71	70	68	70	74	81	85	87	85	81	79	73	77
Mean monthly sunshine hours	223	224	251	222	208	153	109	87	135	189	207	214	2,222
Source: NOAA (humidity, sun 1961–1990)

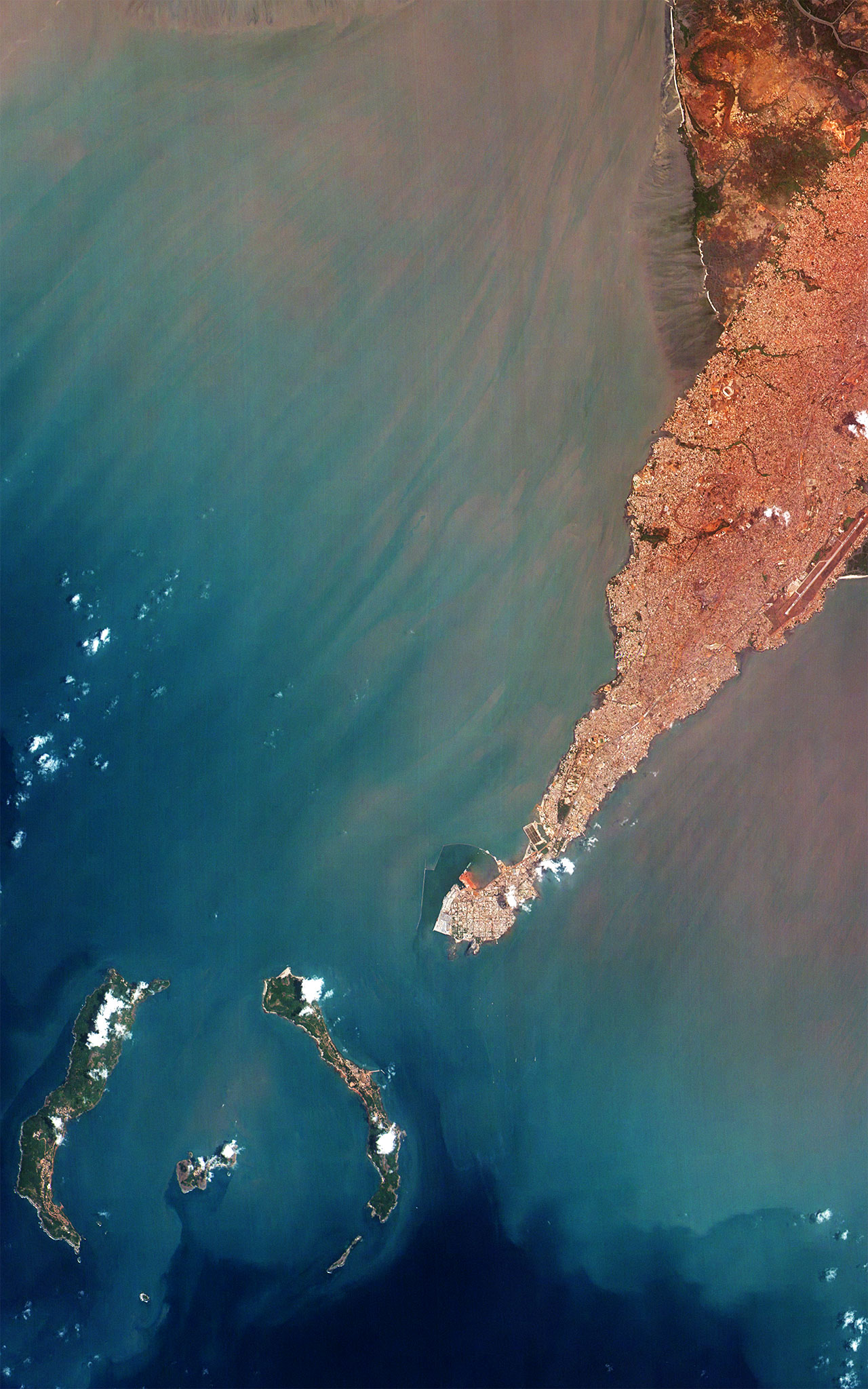
Conakry Peninsula and Îles de Los

== Population ==
Historical population
Year	Pop.	±%
1958	78,388	—
1983	710,372	+806.2%
1996	1,092,631	+53.8%
2014	1,660,973	+52.0%
2025	3,407,327	+105.1%

== Government and administration ==
Conakry is a special city with a single region and prefecture government. The local government of the city was decentralized in 1991 between five municipal communes headed by a mayor. From the tip in the southwest, these were in 2014:

- Kaloum – the city centre at the end of the peninsula, together with the Iles de Los off the southwest of the peninsula.
- Dixinn – along the west side of the peninsula, adjoining the city centre and including the University of Conakry and many embassies.
- Ratoma – further along the west side of the peninsula, and known for its nightlife.
- Matam - along the east side of the peninsula, adjoining the city centre.
- Matoto – further along the east side of the peninsula, and home to Ahmed Sékou Touré International Airport.

By the 2025 Census, the original five communes had been split, with a new Kassa Commune split from Kaloum to create a new commune to cover the archipelagic Iles de Los. Ratoma was split into three communes, with the new communes of Lambanyi and Sonfonia formed from the northeast parts of the original commune. Matoto was similarly split into three communes, with a new Gbessia commune (including the airport) formed from the southern part of the original commune, and a new Tombolia commune formed from the eastern part of the original commune. Three additional communes has been added to Conakry Special Zone from former parts of Kindia Region, namely Kagbélen commune from Dubréka Prefecture on the west side and Sanoyah and Manéah communes from Coyah Prefecture on the east side. Thus there are now thirteen communes within the expanded area of Conakry.

Name of commune	Area (km^{2})	Census 2014 (1 March)	Census 2025 (1 July)
Kassa	14.28	^{(a)}	9,257
Kaloum	4.64	62,675	49,364
Dixinn	7.71	137287	186,553
Ratoma	18.50	653,934	187,265
Lambanyi	23.35	^{(b)}	385,884
Sonfonia	51.66	^{(b)}	310,474
Kagbélen	104.20	^{(c)}	395,370
Matam	6.20	142,658	177,271
Gbessia	15.61	^{(d)}	520,284
Matoto	21.37	670,310	257,026
Tombolia	161.00	^{(d)}	373,424
Sanoyah	24.11	^{(e)}	322,419
Manéah	49.11	^{(e)}	232,736
Total Conakry	500.74	1,940,544	3,407,327

Notes: (a) Included in 2014 figure for Kaloum, from which it was cut out. (b) included in 2014 figure for Ratoma, from which it was cut out.
(c) Not part of Conakry Special Zone in 2014, when it was part of Dubréka Prefecture (with Kindia Region). (d) included in 2014 figure for Matoto, from which it was cut out.
(e) Not part of Conakry Special Zone in 2014, when it was part of Coyah Prefecture (within Kindia Region).

The thirteen urban communes make up the Conakry Region, one of the eight Regions of Guinea, which is headed by a governor. At the second-tier prefecture level, the city is designated as the Conakry Special Zone, though the prefecture and regional government are one and the same. At 3.4 million inhabitants at the 2025 Census, it is far and away the largest city in Guinea, making up almost a fifth of the nation's population and making it more than eight times bigger than its nearest rival, Kankan (which had 410,542 inhabitants in 2025.

== Economy ==
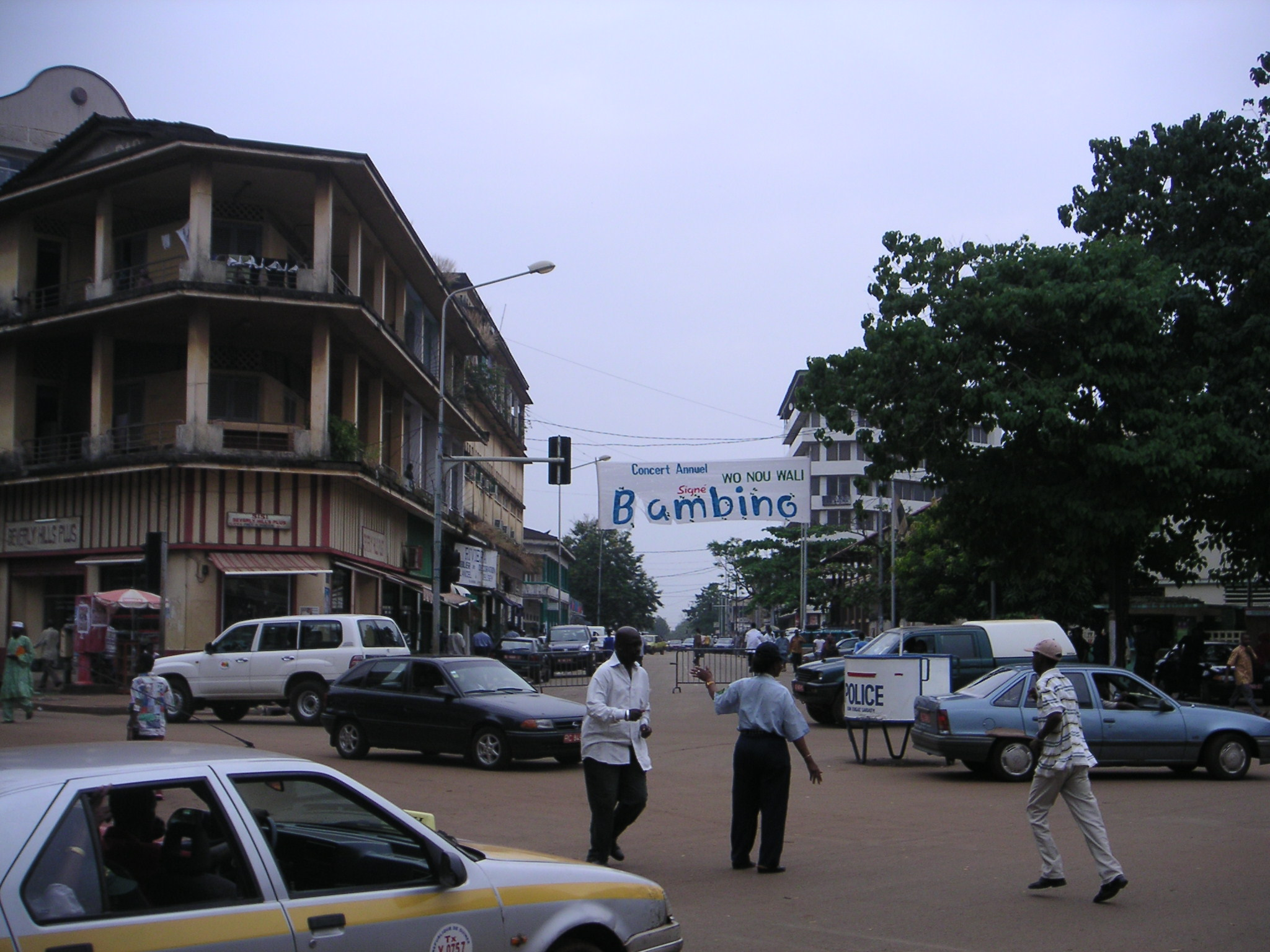
A street scene in Conakry

Conakry is Guinea's largest city and its administrative, communications, and economic centre. The city's economy revolves largely around the port, which has modern facilities for handling and storing cargo, through which alumina and bananas are shipped. Manufactures include food products and cement, metal manufactures, and fuel products.

=== Markets ===
- Marché Madina
- Marché du Niger

=== Infrastructure crisis ===
Periodic power and water cuts have been a daily burden for Conakry's residents since early 2002. Government and power company officials blame the drought of February 2001 for a failure of the hydro-electric supply to the capital, and a failure of aging machinery for the continuation of the crisis. Critics of the government cite mismanagement, corruption and the withdrawal of the power agency's French partner at the beginning of 2002. As of 2007, much of the city has no traffic lighting in the overnight hours.

Popular anger at shortages in Conakry was entwined with anti-government protests, strikes, and violence against the rule of President Lansana Conté and the successive prime ministers Cellou Dalein Diallo and Eugène Camara appointed to fill the post after the resignation of Prime Minister François Lonseny Fall in April 2004. Violence reached a peak in January–February 2007 in a general strike, which saw over one hundred deaths when the Army confronted protesters.

== Transportation ==
Conakry is served by Conakry International Airport which has flights to several cities in West Africa and Europe.

== Architecture ==
- Palais Mohammed V
- Presidential Palace
- Palais du Peuple

== Hospitals ==
- Donka Hospital
- Ignace Deen Hospital
- Clinique Ambroise Paré
- Clinique Pasteur

== Culture ==
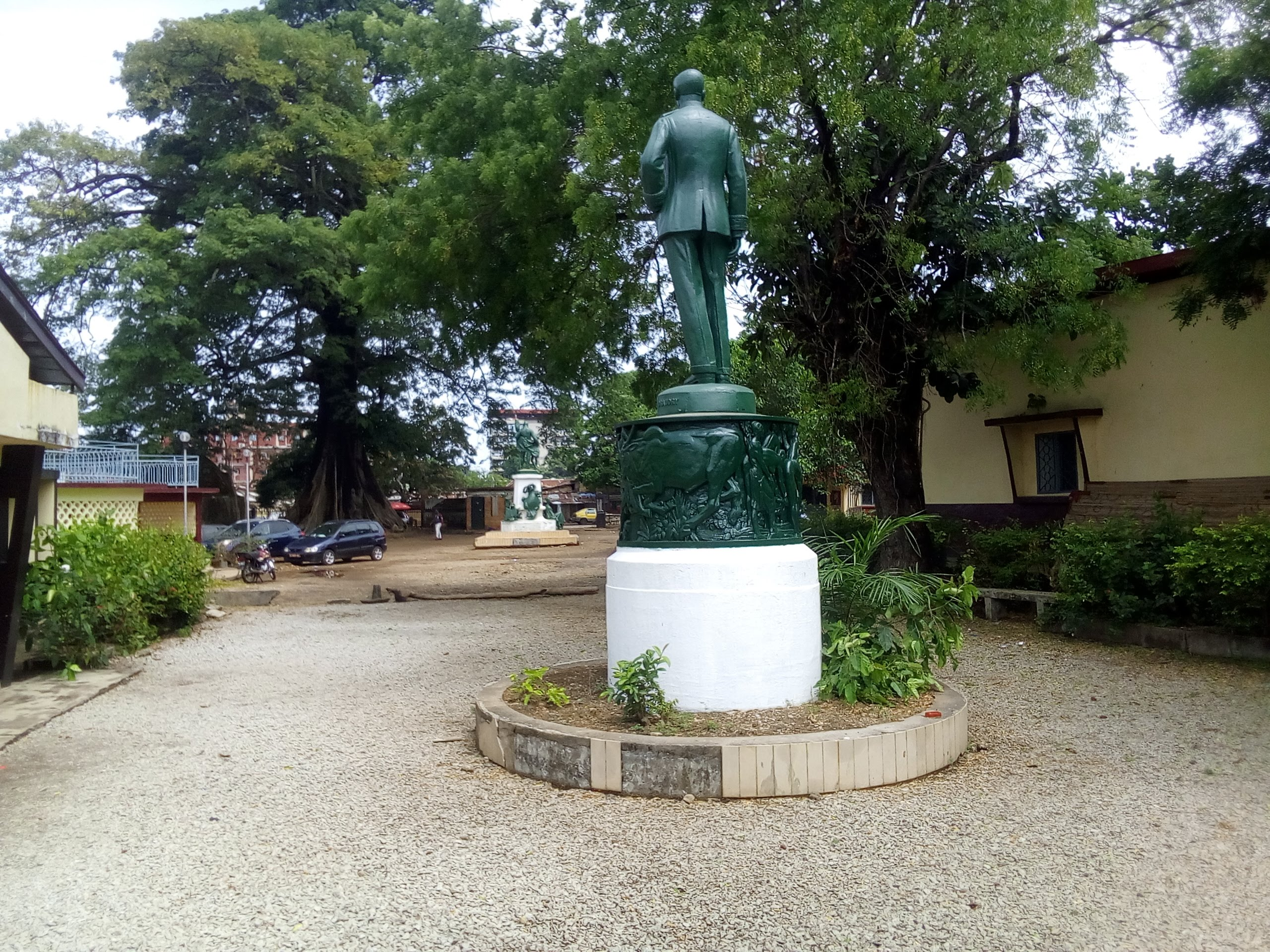
Courtyard at Sandervalia National Museum

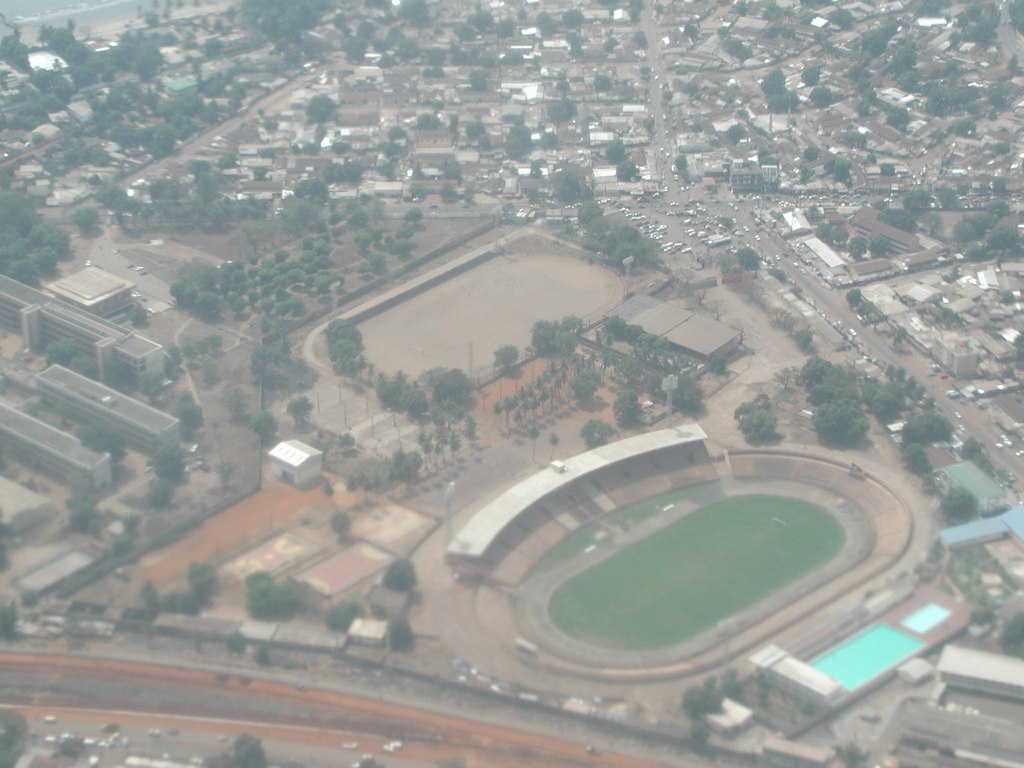
Stade du 28 Septembre

- Sandervalia National Museum
- National Library of Guinea and National Archives of Guinea
- Camp Boiro
- Monument du 22 Novembre 1970

=== Places of worship ===
The Grand Mosque of Conakry

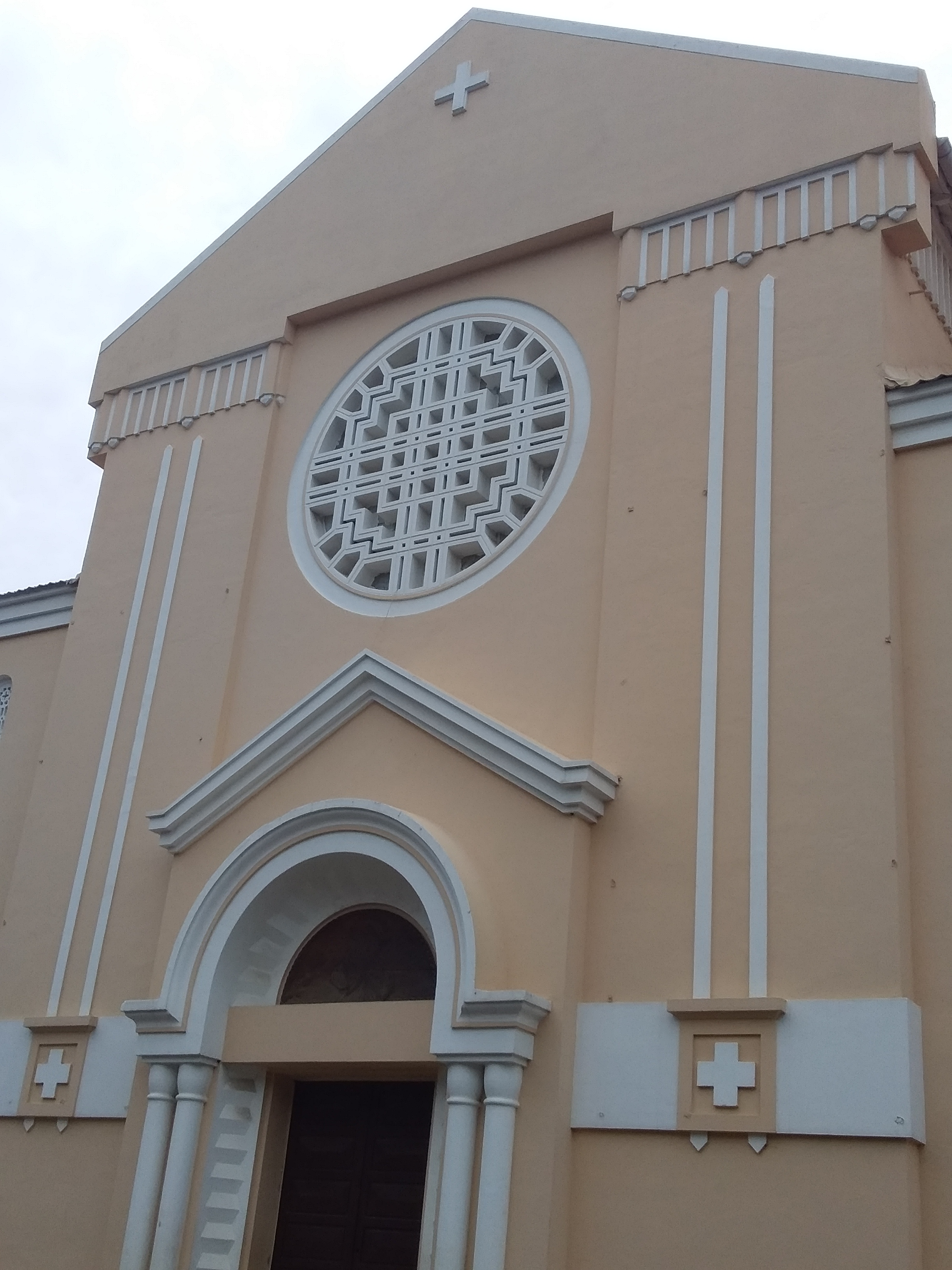
St. Mary's Cathedral

Islamic mosques in the city include the Grand Mosque of Conakry. There are also Christian churches and temples, including the Roman Catholic Archdiocese of Conakry's Cathédrale Sainte-Marie, the Église Protestante Évangélique de Guinée (Alliance World Fellowship), and the Assemblies of God.

=== Universities and education ===
- Collège Gbessia Centre
- Collège-Lycée Sainte-Marie
- Gamal Abdel Nasser University (Institut Polytechnique de Conakry)
- Institut Géographique National (Guinea)
- Université Kofi Annan
- Lycée français Albert Camus

=== Parks and gardens ===
- Jardin 2 Octobre
- Conakry Botanical Garden

== Notable people ==
- Hadji Barry, professional footballer
- Moussa Cissé, NBA basketball player for the Dallas Mavericks
- Mamadi Diakite, former NBA basketball player for the New York Knicks
- Mamadou Diallo, professional footballer
- Queen Aminata, professional wrestler (AEW and ROH)
- Maciré Sylla, singer, dancer, author and composer
- M'Mahawa Sylla, Guinean army officer
- Mohamed Yattara, professional footballer

== See also ==
- 2007 Guinean general strike
- 2009 Guinea protest
- Île Tamara Lighthouse
