= Ratoma =

- Sub-prefecture

- Location in Guinea
- Coordinates: 9°35′N 13°39′W
- Country: Guinea
- Region: Conakry Region

Area
  - Total: 7.14 sq mi (18.50 km^{2})

Population (mid 2025 Census)
  - Total: 187,265
  - Density: 26,220/sq mi (10,120/km^{2})
- Time zone: UTC+0 (GMT)

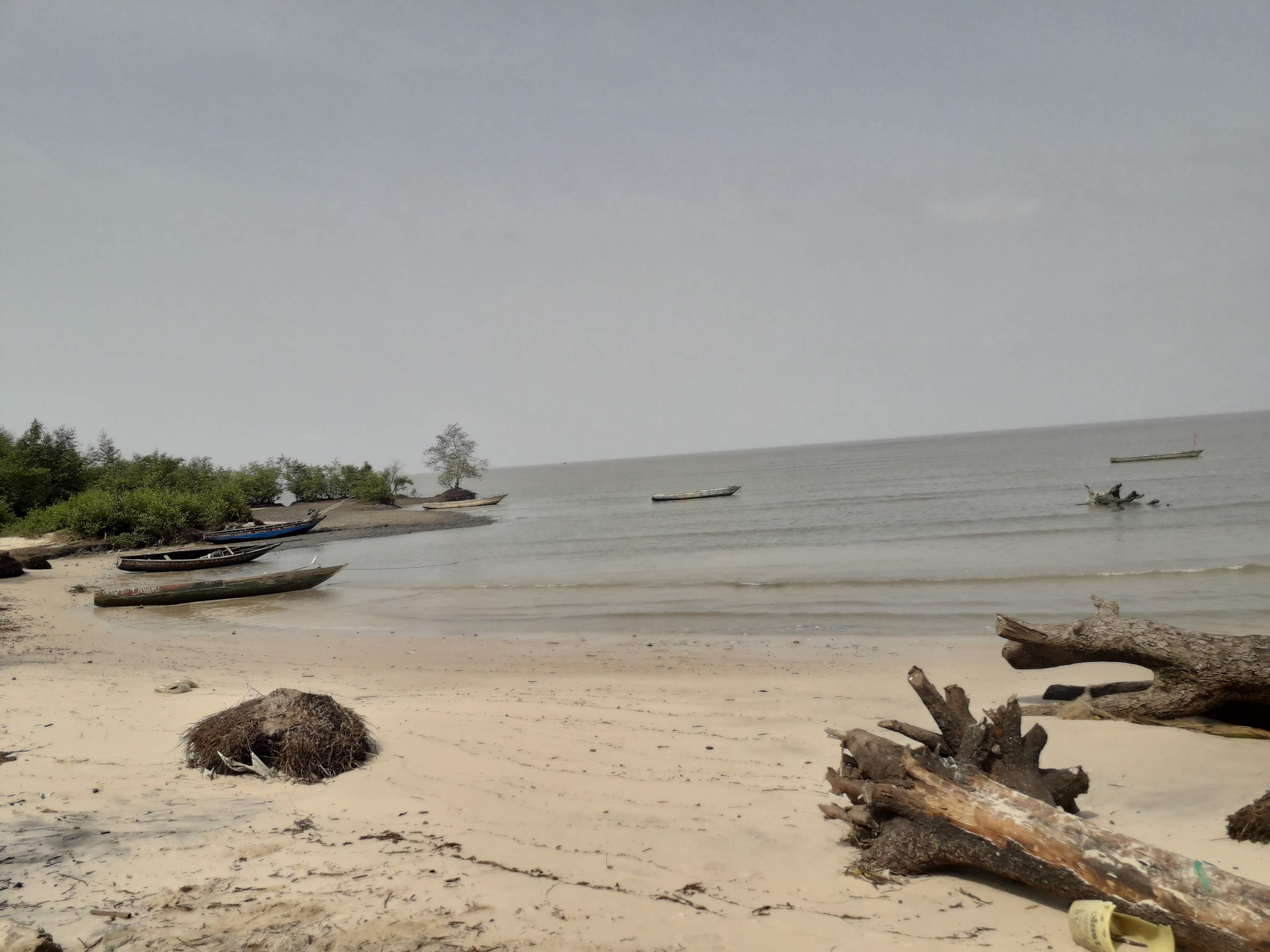
Beach of Tayaki

Ratoma is an urban sub-prefecture (and commune) in the Conakry Region of Guinea and now one of thirteen in the capital Conakry. As of 2014 it covered 93.51 km^{2} along the west side of the Conakry peninsula and had a population of 653,934 people. However by 2025 it had been split into three communes, with the new communes of Lambanyi and Sonfonia being split off to the northeast of the residual Ratoma, which now covers 18.5 km^{2} with a Census 2025 population of 187,265 (preliminary census return). The new Lambanyi commune covers 23.35 km^{2} with a population of 385,884 at the 2025 Census, while the new Sonfonia commune covers 51.66 km^{2} with a population of 310,474 at the 2025 Census (preliminary census return).
