= Monument du 22 Novembre 1970, Conakry =

Coordinates: 9.521468°N 13.690515°W

Monument du 22 Novembre 1970
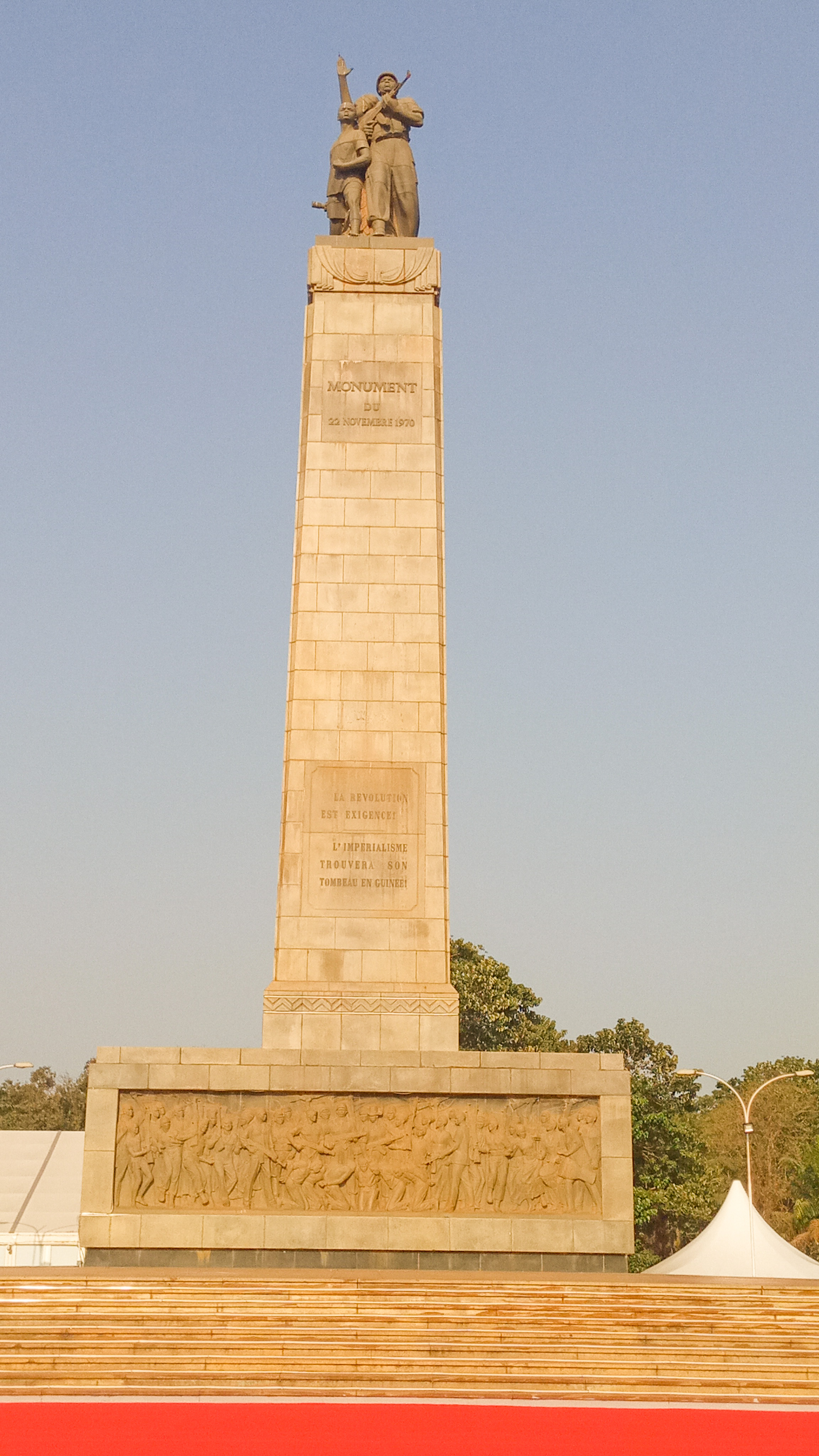
- Guinean monument
- Interactive map of Monument du 22 Novembre 1970
- Location: Conakry, Guinea
- Opening date: 22 November 1971
- Dedicated to: Victims of Operação Mar Verde

The Monument du 22 Novembre 1970 is a monument in Conakry, Guinea that celebrates the defeat of the attempted coup led by Portuguese troops in 1970, named Operation Green Sea.

On 21 November 1970 a group of Portuguese troops assisted by Guinean fighters invaded Conakry from the sea in an attempt to overthrow the Touré regime. They captured Camp Boiro and liberated the prisoners. The camp commandant Siaka Touré managed to hide, but General Lansana Diané, minister of Defense, was captured. He later escaped and took refuge with the ambassador of Algeria.

The coup attempt failed, and in the aftermath many opponents of the regime were rounded up and imprisoned in Camp Boiro.

Construction of the monument began before 22 November 1971 in memory of the victims of the coup attempt. President Sékou Touré laid the foundation stone. The occasion was attended by many Guinean officials, and by Guinean and Chinese workers at the construction site. The Chinese chargé d'affaires Tsao Kouan-lin made a speech praising the militant friendship between the people of Guinea and of China.

The monument has the legend:

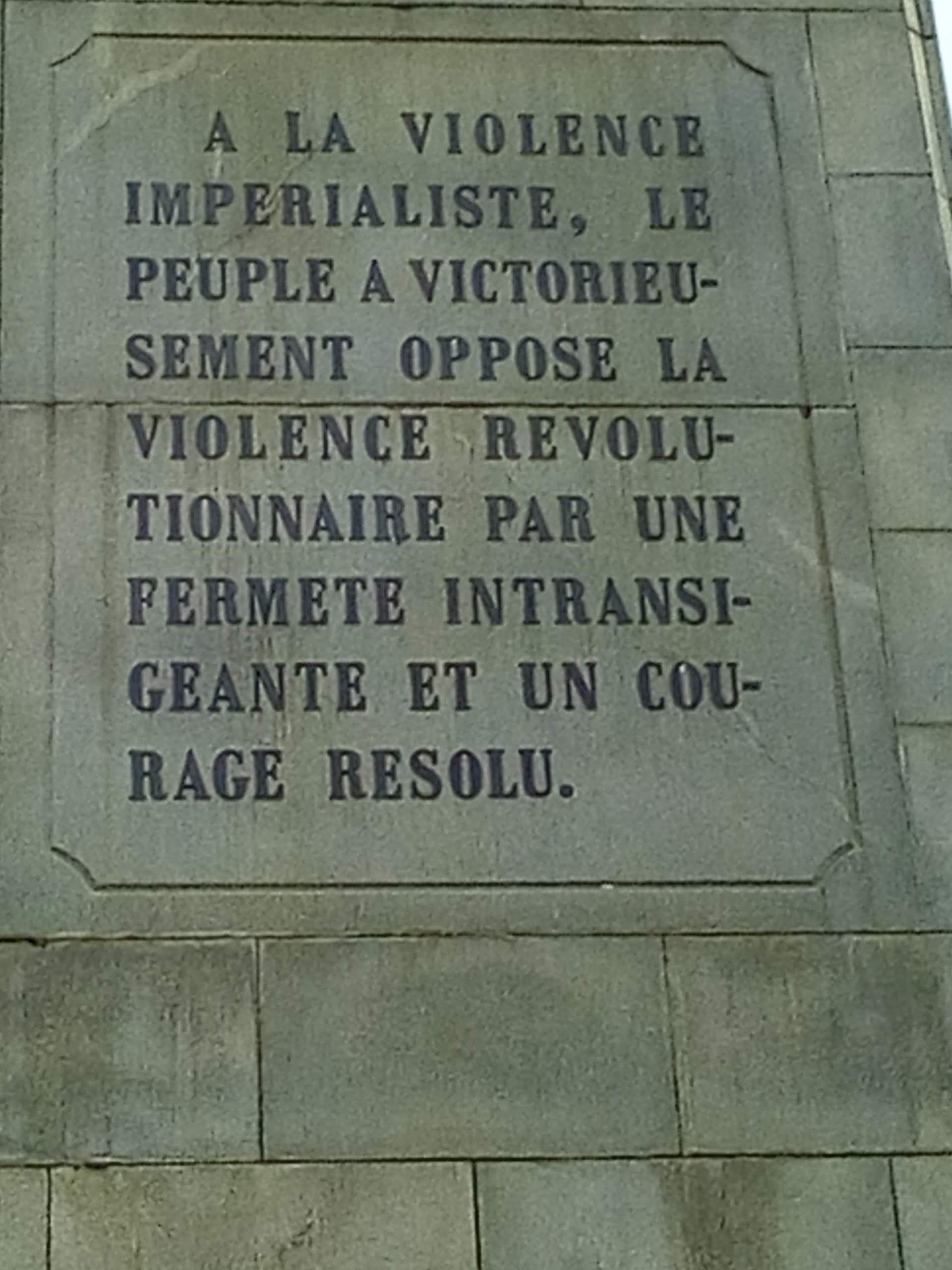

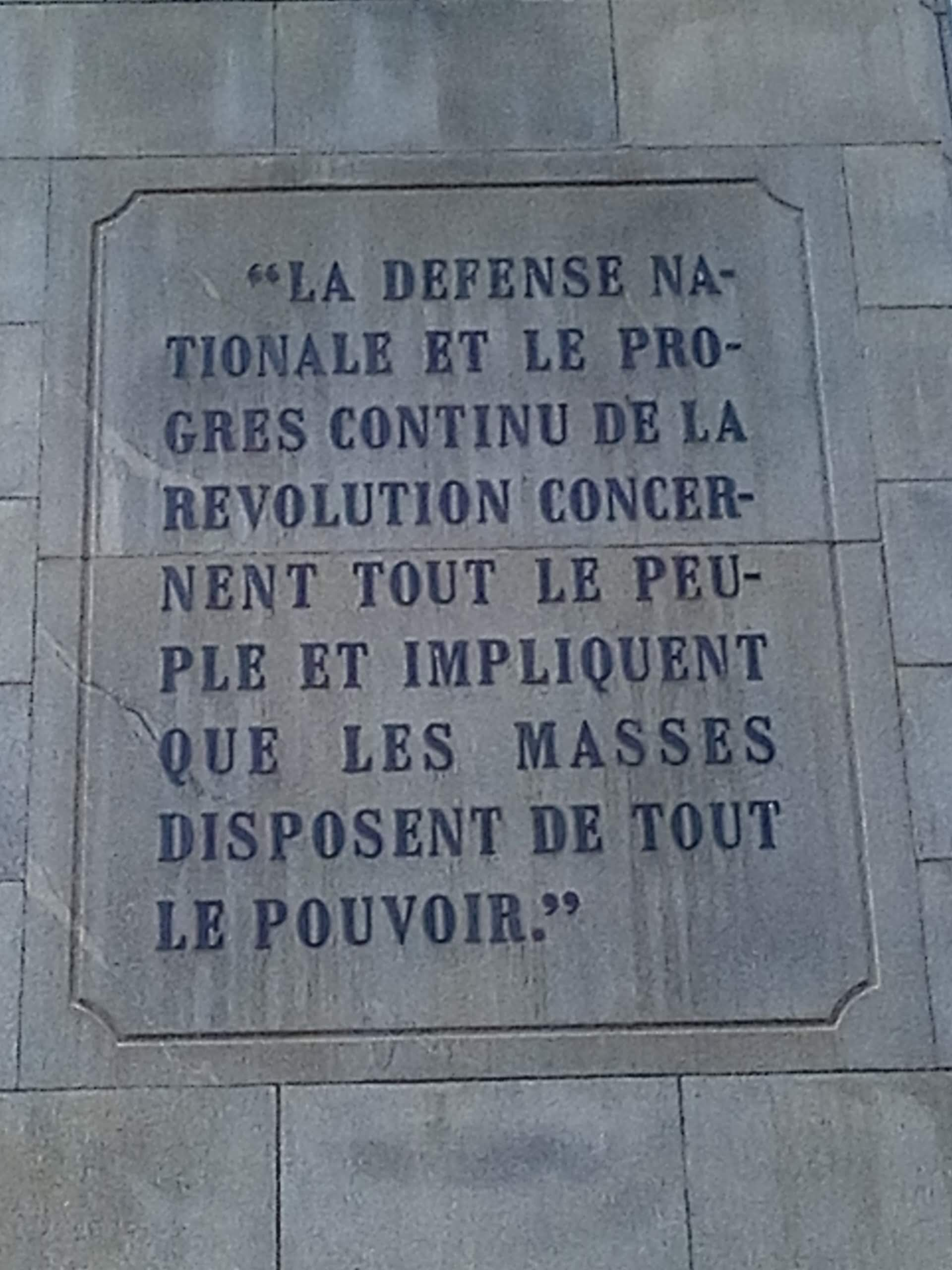

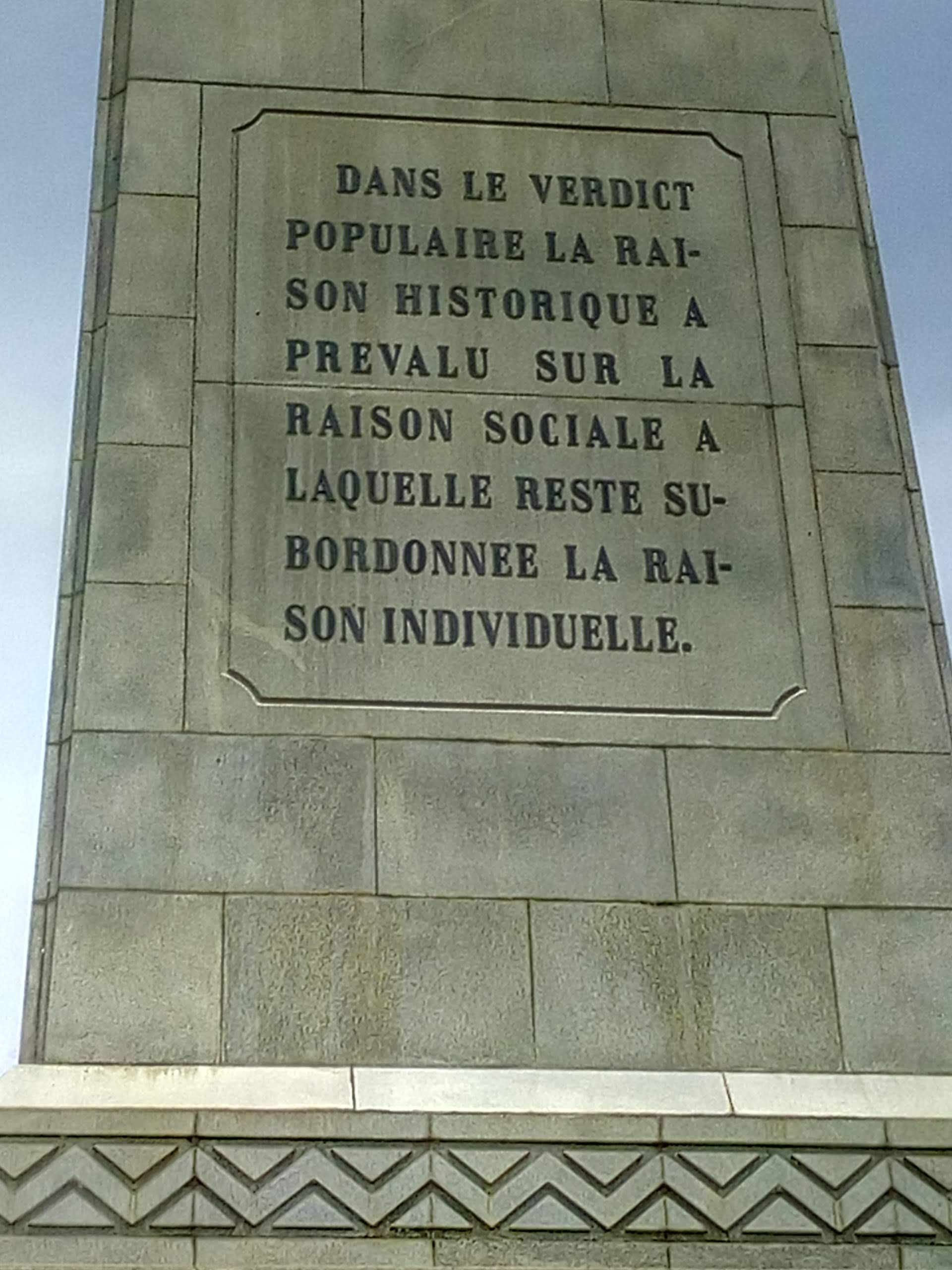

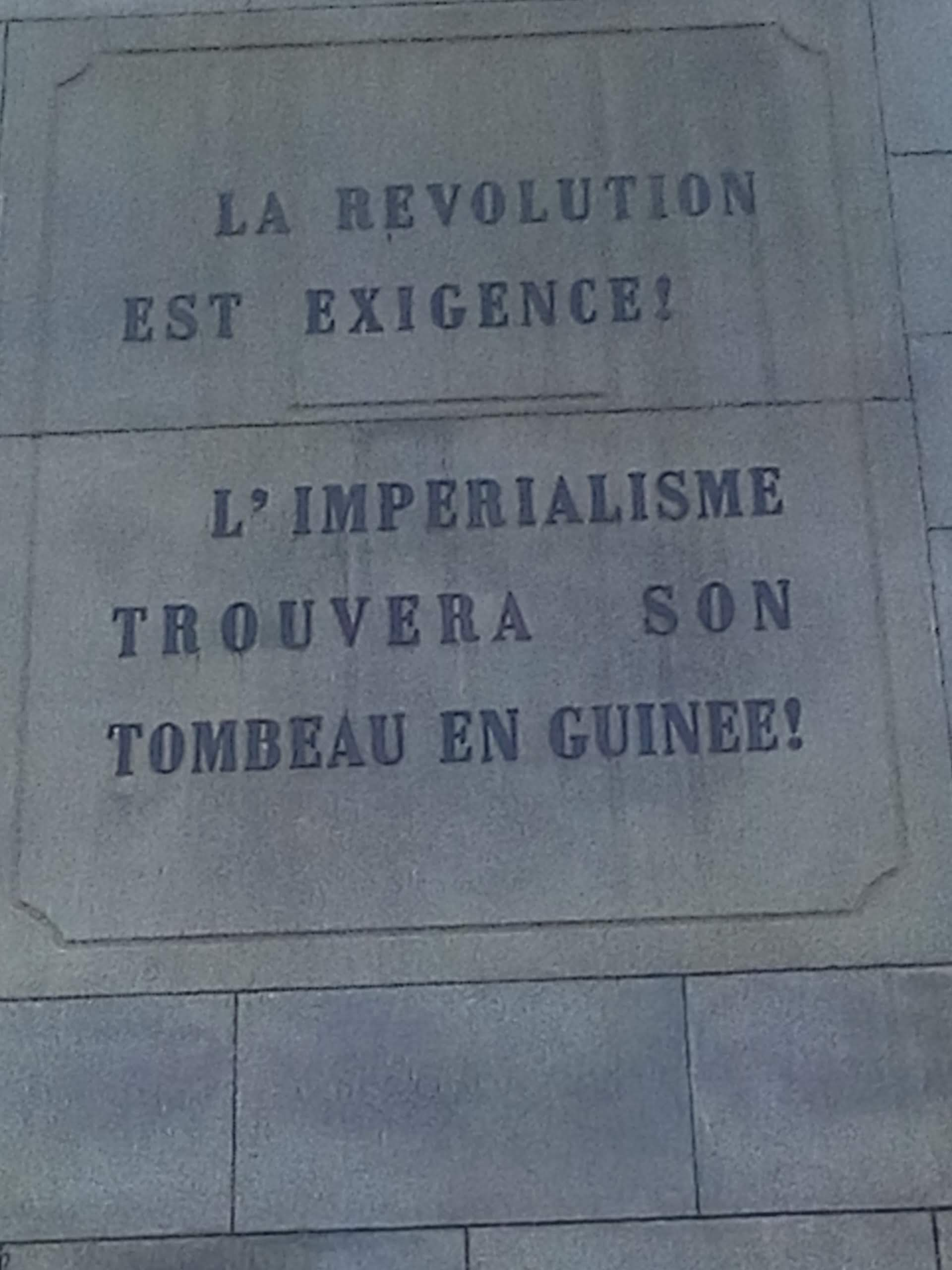

MONUMENT DU 22 NOVEMBRE 1970.
LA REVOLUTION EST EXIGENTE!
L´IMPERIALISME TROUVERA SON TOMBEAU EN GUINEE!

(Monument of 22 November 1970. The Revolution is Imperative! Imperialism finds its grave in Guinea!)
