= Kaloum =

- Sub-prefecture
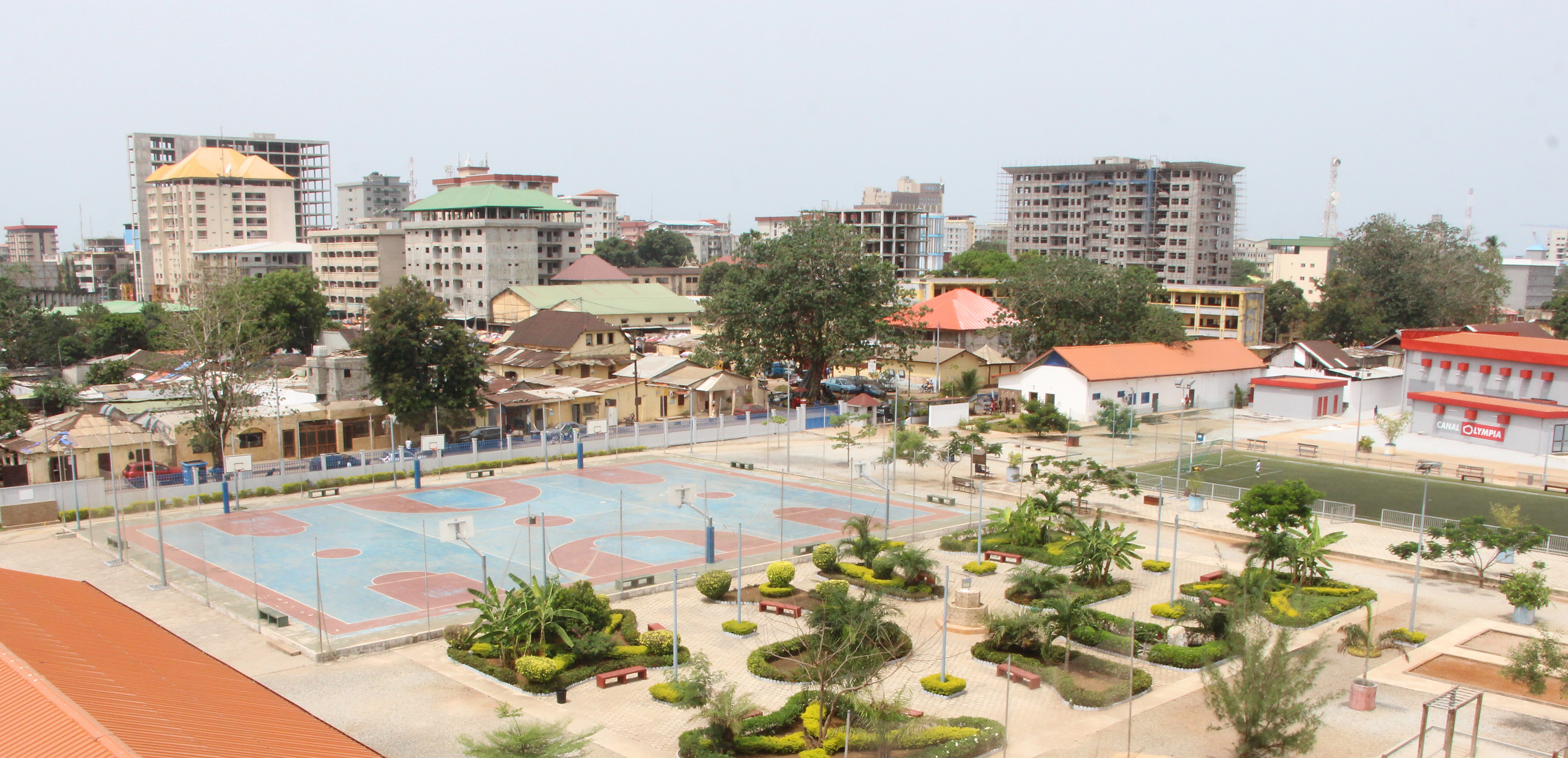

- Location in Guinea
- Coordinates: 9°30′33″N 13°42′44″W
- Country: Guinea
- Region: Conakry Region

Area
  - Total: 1.79 sq mi (4.64 km^{2})

Population (2025 census)
  - Total: 49,364
  - Density: 27,550/sq mi (10,639/km^{2})
- Time zone: UTC+0 (GMT)

Kaloum is an urban sub-prefecture (commune) in the Conakry Region of Guinea and one of thirteen in the capital Conakry. Kaloum includes the city centre of Conakry. As of 2014 it had a population of 62,675 people; at the 1 July 2025 census (following the separation of the achipelago of the Iles de Los to create a separate commune), the population of Kaloum was 49,364 (preliminary census return).

The seat of Government is located in Kaloum, including the Presidential Palace, the Palais du Peuple, many ministries, embassies and banks. The Port of Conakry and the fishing port are located there. The Ignace Deen Hospital, one of the first in the nation, was built there in the colonial era. Other notable features include the Sandervalia National Museum and St. Mary's Cathedral, Conakry.

While Air Guinée was in operation, its head office was in Kaloum.

== Gallery ==
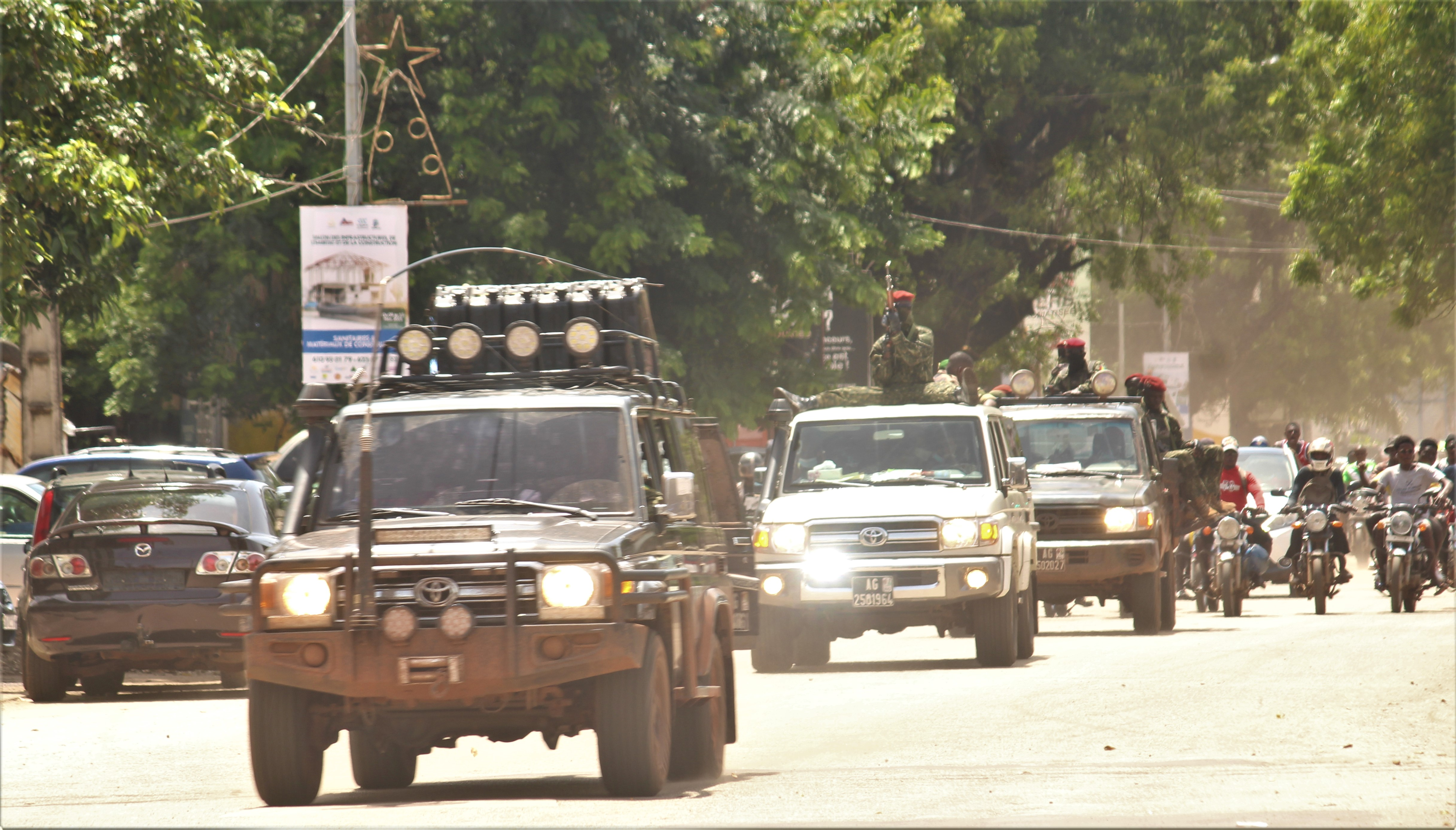

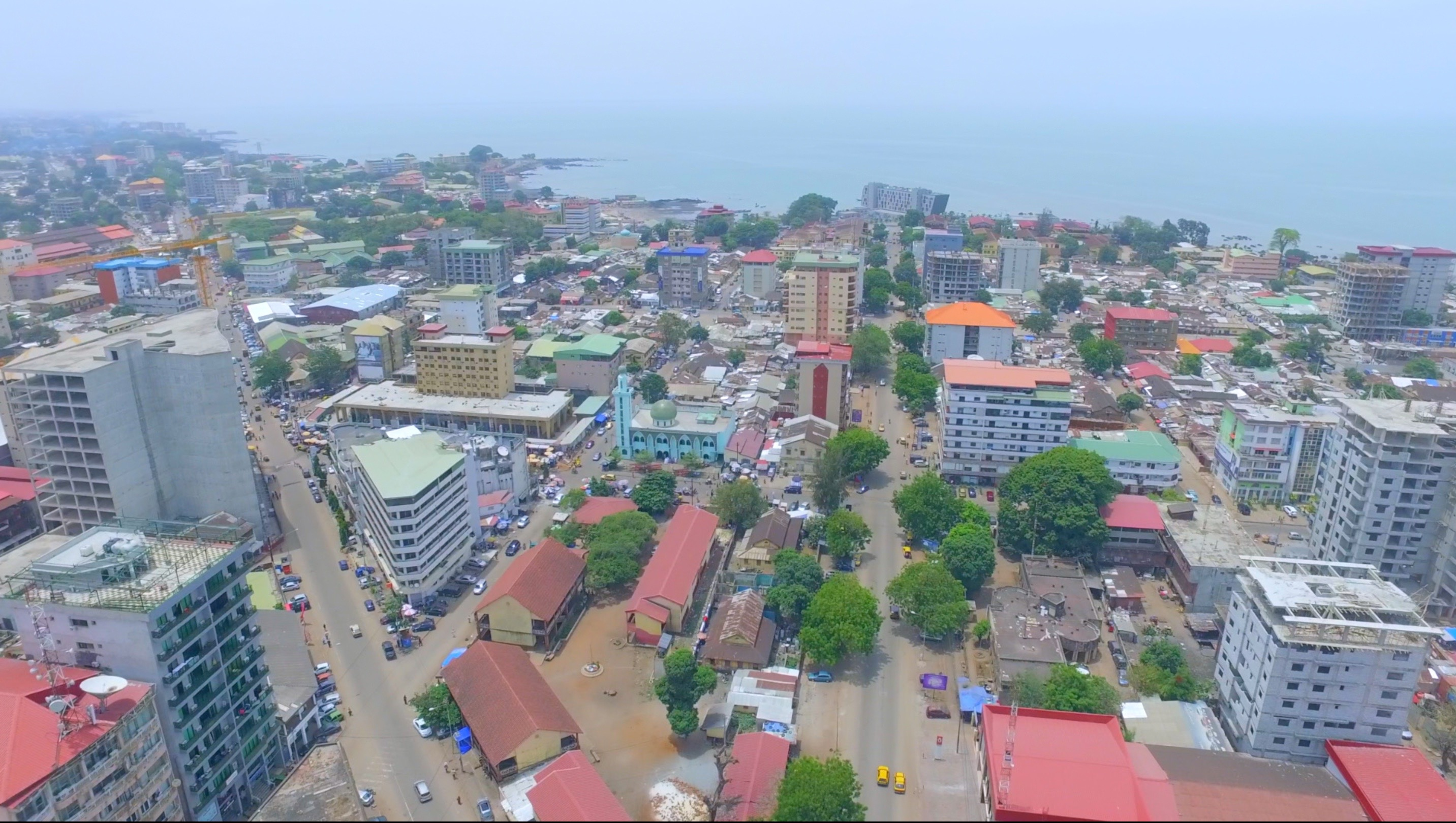

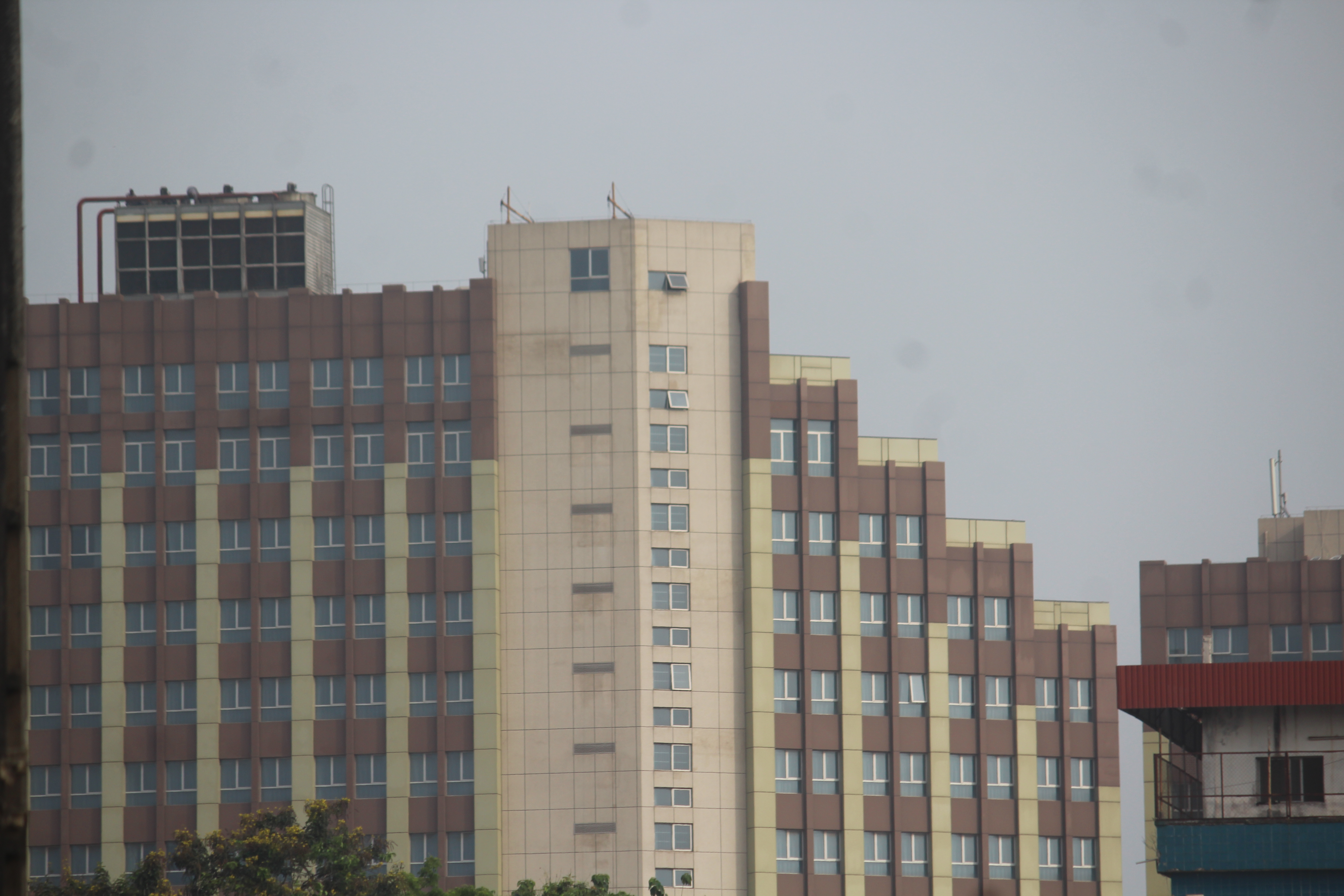

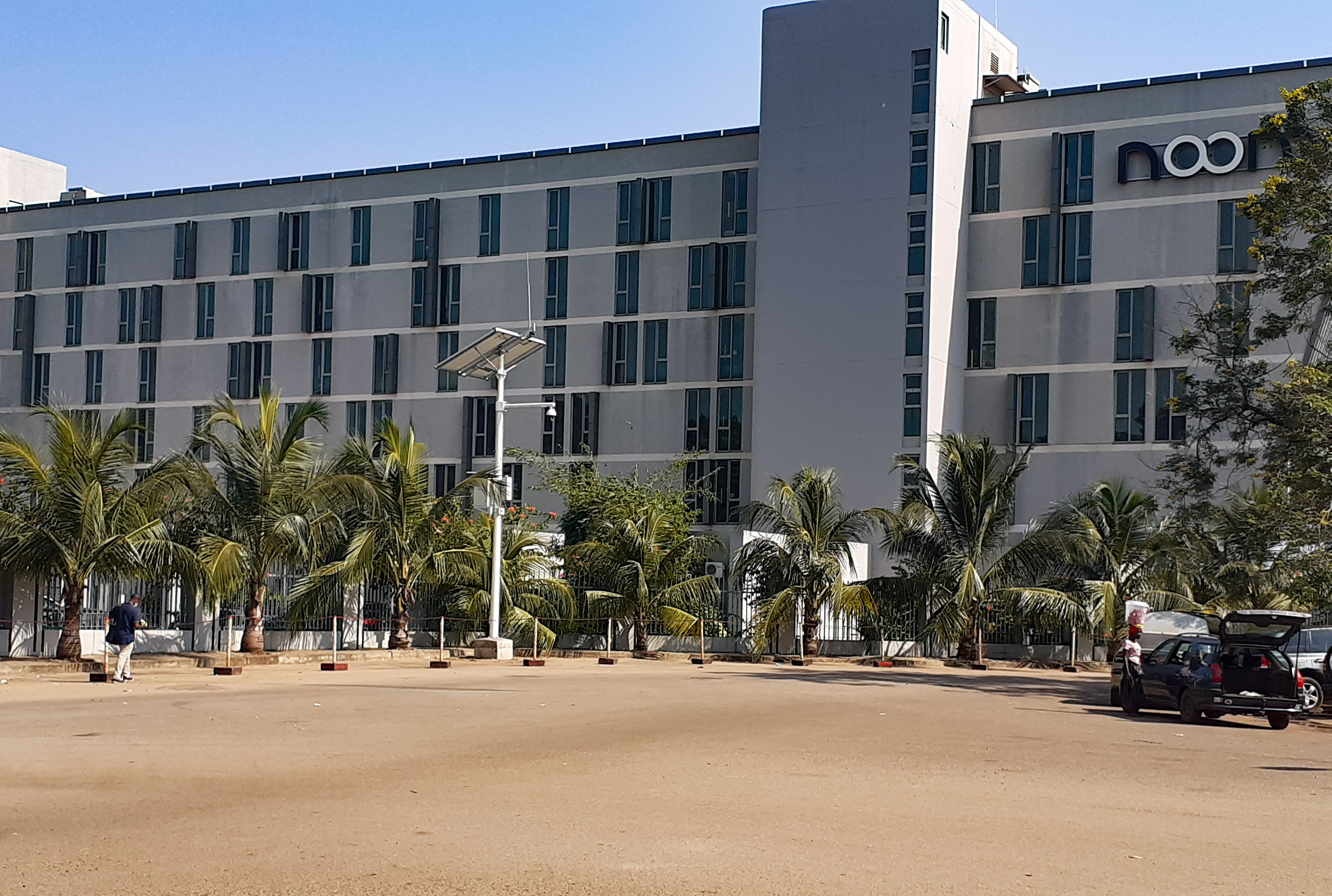
