= Sandervalia National Museum =

- Musée national de Sandervalia
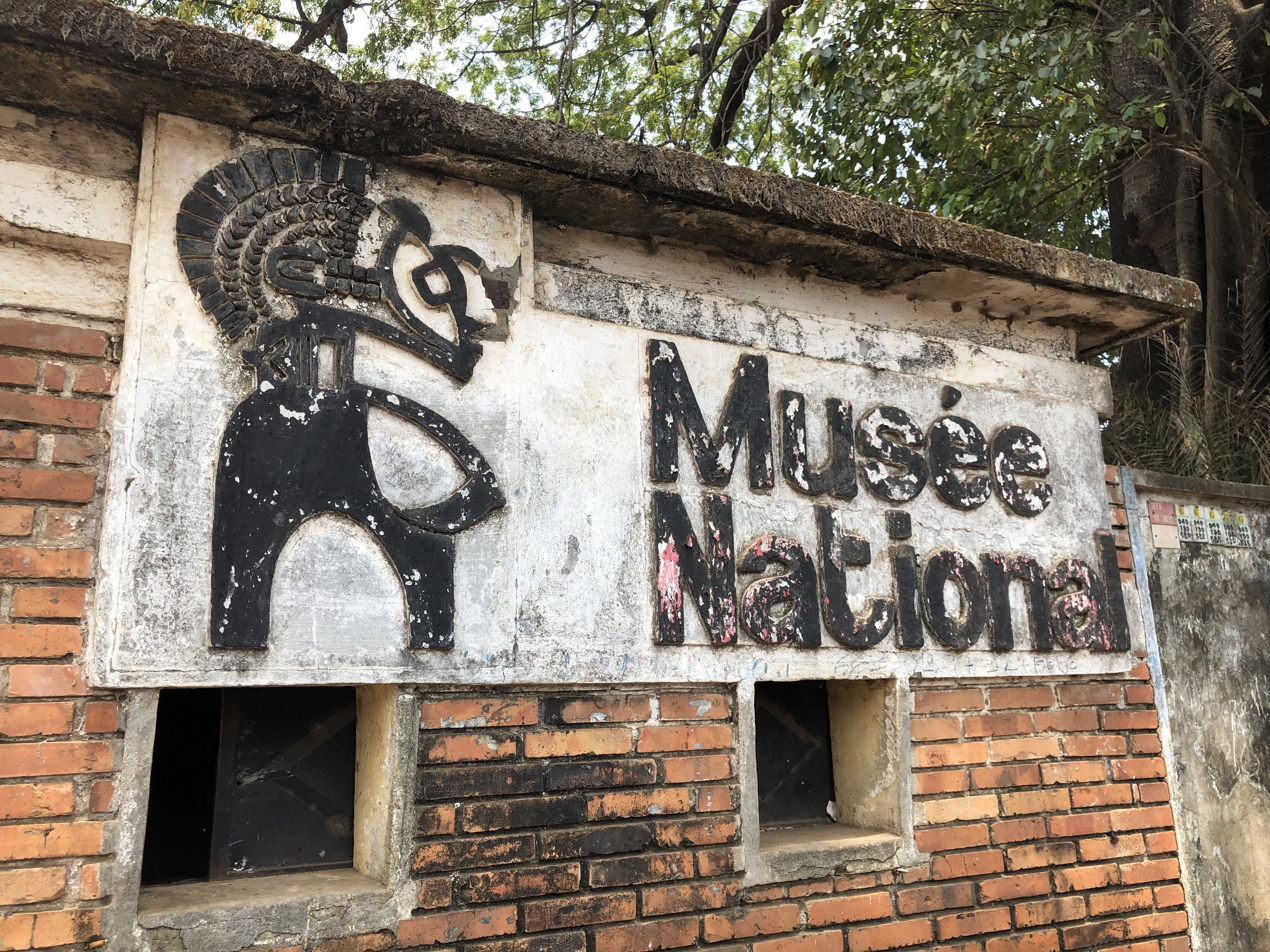
- The Noël Ballay monument stands in the courtyard of the museum

- Location within Guinea
- Established: 1960
- Coordinates: 9.504702°N 13.709003°W
- Type: National museum

The Sandervalia National Museum (French: Musée national de Sandervalia) is the national museum of Guinea, situated in the capital, Conakry. Most of the rooms are empty, but it contains a limited display of traditional objects from different regions of Guinea, as well as objects and statues from the colonial era. Various craft items are for sale.

== Location ==
The Sandervalia National Museum is located near the Ignace Deen Hospital on the 7th boulevard in Kaloum, in the Sandervalia quarter of Conakry. The museum is located in a park in the Sandervalia district that had large trees, all but one of which has been cut down. One wing has been restored with the support of the Embassy of Japan. A masonry box built in 1896 by Aimé Olivier de Sanderval is found to the right of the entrance. It is a curious concrete arch that is sometimes used informally by artists to exhibit their paintings.

== History ==
Between 1959 and 1984 Guinea was controlled by a totalitarian state that established Islam as the state religion and confiscated almost all religious art. In parallel, a policy to encourage traditional folklore led to foundation of the museum, Les Ballets Africains and Radio Télévision Guinéenne. The museum was founded in 1960 to house examples of traditional arts. After the military coup of 1984 the restrictions on indigenous religion were lifted. The museum, with much of its collection now lost, became a center for the small artistic community in Conakry. In the early 1990s it sponsored various conferences for citizens interested in culture.

As of 2007 the oldest pieces had long disappeared and the museum was described as more of a shop than a museum. The museum was used as a meeting place in 2014 for the steering committee organizing the festivities in Mamou for the 56th anniversary of independence. In 2016 the painter Papus had his workshop in the museum. The museum was open from 9:00 to 15:00 and from 16:00 to 18:00 on Sundays, and from 16:00 to 18:00 on public holidays. It is also used for art exhibitions and other cultural events.

== Collection ==
The museum has a collection of antique objects from around the country that represent different cultures and ethnicities, as well as objects from the colonial era. The collection included masks and a sacred forest. As of 2016 the building was empty apart from one room, which had a number of masks and musical instruments from different parts of Guinea. There is a model at the end of the permanent exhibition representing the houses of different regions of the country. Beside this room there is an artisan gallery where various items were exhibited for sale such as fabrics, traditional costumes, wooden statues and embossed Tuareg leather.

Statues from the colonial era are collected in the courtyard of the museum. They represent historical figures of Guinea and included Almamy Samori Ture. There are statues of Sanderval, of the Governor Noël Ballay by the sculptor H. Allourd, of Doctor Victor Le Moal (1876–1908), and of Monseigneur Raymond René Lérouge (1876–1949) surrounded by musicians and a fisherman with his wife and children. The courtyard contains a buffet restaurant. Its railings are curiously decorated with colonial helmets. The cafeteria is in a hut wearing a giant colonial helmet, apparently an empty tribute to the French colonialists.

== See also ==
- List of buildings and structures in Guinea

== Sources ==
- Auzias, Dominique; Labourdette, Jean-Paul; Gazel, Alexandra (2007), République de Guinée, Guinée-Bissau, Petit Futé, ISBN 978-2-7469-1603-6
- Bloom, Jonathan M.; Blair, Sheila S. (2009), The Grove Encyclopedia of Islamic Art and Architecture, Oxford University Press Incorporated, ISBN 978-0-19-530991-1
- "Comité de pilotage des festivités du 56ème anniversaire ...", Guinée Matin (in French), 20 August 2014
- Conakry, Guinea: Musée National de Conakry, SIBMAS: International Directory of Performing Arts Collections and Institutions, archived from the original on 2011-09-28
- "Le Musée national de Sandervalia au coeur de Conakry", Guinée Culture (in French), 4 May 2013, archived from the original on 2016-10-19
- Mogenet, Luc, "Le Musée National Sandervalia", GuineeConakry.info (in French), archived from the original on March 17, 2014
- Musée national (in French), Petit Futé
