= Matoto =

- Sub-prefecture
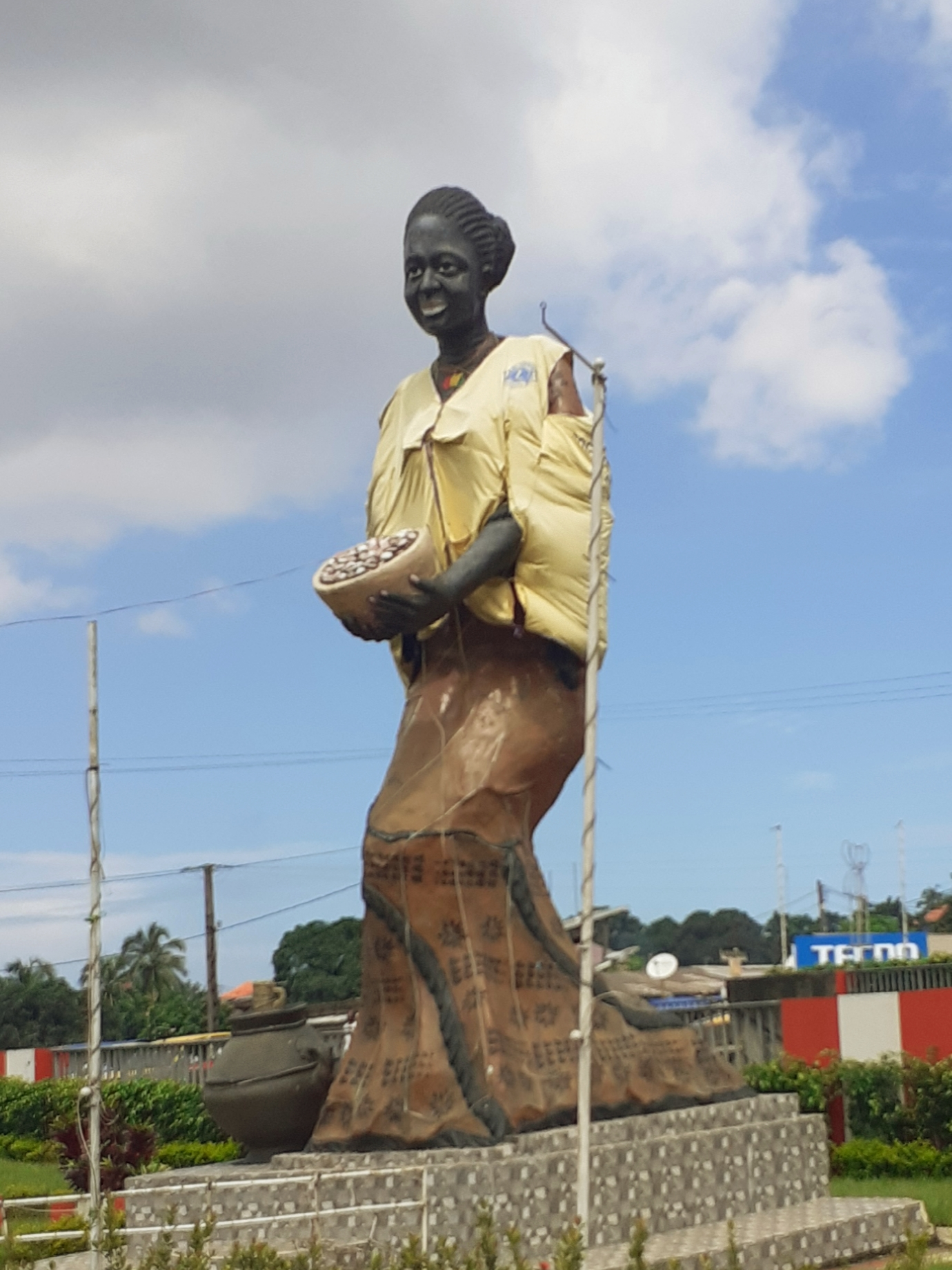

- Location in Guinea
- Coordinates: 9°34′37″N 13°36′43″W
- Country: Guinea
- Region: Conakry Region

Area
  - Land: 8.25 sq mi (21.37 km^{2})

Population (mid 2025 Census)
  - Total: 257,026
  - Density: 31,150/sq mi (12,030/km^{2})
- Time zone: UTC+0 (GMT)

Matoto is an urban sub-prefecture (commune) in the Conakry Region of Guinea and one of thirteen in the capital Conakry. Situated along the east side of the Conakry peninsula, at the 2014 Census it covered an area of 197.98 km^{2} and had a population of 670,310 people; however by 2025 it had been split into three communies, with the new commune of Gbessia created to its southwest and the new commune of Tombolia created to its east.

The residual Matoto commune covers an area of 21.37 km^{2} and had a population of 257,026 at the 2025 Census. The new Gbessia commune covers an area of 15.61 km^{2} and had a population of 520,284 in 2025. The new Tombolia commune covers an area of 161 km^{2} and had a population of 373,424 in 2025 (preliminary census returns).

Gbessia Airport is located in Gbessia commune (and thus originally in Matoto commune).
