= Presidential Palace, Conakry =

Official residence of the President of Guinea

Coordinates: 9.5102°N 13.7175°W

The Sekhoutoureah Presidential Palace (French: Palais présidentiel Sekhoutoureah) in Conakry, Guinea, is the official residence of the president of Guinea. The Palais Presidentiel Sekhoutoureah is behind the Cathédrale Sainte-Marie.

== See also ==
- List of buildings and structures in Guinea
