= Kissi Kaba Keita =

19th century Kissi warrior and chief

Kissi Kaba Keita was a Kissi warrior and chief in the 19th century who managed to unite many Kissi chiefdoms under his reign and resist French conquest for many years.

== Accession to the throne ==
Kissi Kaba Keita was the son of Suleimani Leno, son of Fadaka. He adopted a Mandinka name to prove his legitimacy to the throne as a supposed relative of Sundiata Keita. Intrigues around the throne brought Kissi Kaba in direct conflict with his cousin Asana Leno, son of Sépé of Korodou. His success led to his coronation with the support of his adoptive father Soulemani Savané. Hence, he extended his control to the border with Soulemani Savané. During his reign, he rallied the Kurankos of Morige, and the Leles of Yombiro. When pressed into battle, he would assemble an army led by divisions according to their origin: The Kurankos under Kourani-Sori Mara, the warriors from the Faramayan, his place of origin, under himself and divisions from Buye and Nbelto. His general was Dawo Leno, and under him were Masa, Uri Mano from Bendu and Bampo Tenkiano from Nende Lane. With this army, he had mainly attempted to conquer Bendu, Fermesadou and Tenkin.

== Resistance to French conquest ==
When the French arrived in 1892, he had to let the relatively autonomous chiefs of the respective areas defend themselves. Due to the French's technological superiority, Kissi Kaba resorted mainly to guerilla tactics: His warriors would wait for French troops while hidden close to rivers or in forests and would attack the French by surprise with the main goal of kidnapping or killing the French officers. Furthermore, they would cut down all liana bridges to slow down the French advance. However, by 1893, Kissi Kaba realized that his resistance would fail and subjected himself to them. As such, they recognized him as chief of the northern Kissi territory. However, he his relationship with the French gradually worsened, which first led to the French appointing his rivals in a number of his chiefdoms, until he was finally executed in Siguiri.

== Return of his ashes to Kissidougou ==
In 1978, the ashes of Kissi Kaba were finally brought back to Kissidougou from Siguiri where had been shot by the French colonial power. While known as a kissi (son of Suleimani Leno, son of Fadaka), Kissi Kaba had claimed kinship to Sundiata Keita, the emperor of Mali. During the ceremony of his ashes' return, this relationship was retold by some griots: According to those reports, Kissi Kaba was descended from Mansa Dankaran Touman, the first son of faama Naré Maghann Konaté. Dankaran Touman was the older brother of Sundiata Keita.
