= Bardou =

Bardou may refer to:

== Places ==
- Bardou, Dordogne, commune in the Dordogne, France
- Bardou, Guinea, town in the Kissidougou Prefecture in Guinea
- Bardou, Hérault, village in the Hérault, France

== People with the surname ==
- Denis Albert Bardou (1841–1893), French optics manufacturer
- Emanuel Bardou (1744–1818), Swiss sculptor
- Jorge Bardou (born 1965), Spanish tennis player
- Miguel Arias Bardou (1841–1915), Spanish born Cuban painter
- Pierre Bardou-Job (1826–92), French manufacturer of JOB cigarette papers
