= Kissidougou =

- Sub-prefecture and town
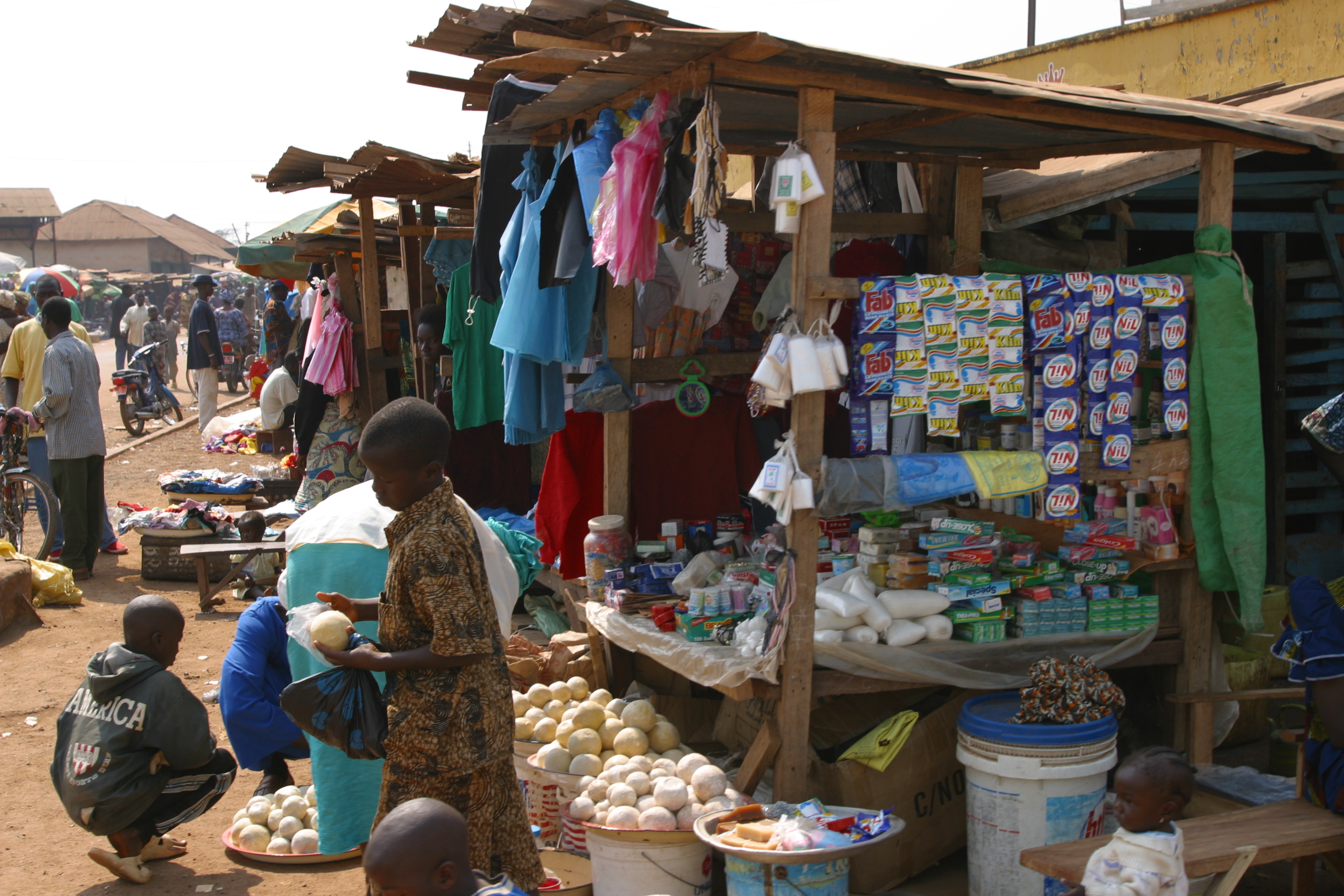
- Kissidougou market on a quiet day

- Location within Guinea
- Coordinates: 09°11′0″N 10°6′0″W
- Country: Guinea
- Region: Faranah Region
- Prefecture: Kissidougou Prefecture

Government
  - Mayor: Yomba Sanoh
- Elevation: 520 m (1,710 ft)

Population (2025 census)
  - Total: 167,985

Kissidougou (French pronunciation: [kisidugu]; N'Ko: ߞߛߌ߬ߘߎ߯; pronounced like Kiss-eh-dow-goo) is a city in southern Guinea. It is the capital of in the Kissidougou Prefecture. As of 2025 it had a population of 167,985 people.

The town is served by Kissidougou Airport, and the Niandan river flows past the city. The city is known for the coffee plantations and large expanses of nearby forest. Other attractions in Kissidougou include a museum, a football team and a major bridge.

== History ==
Kissidougou was reportedly founded by Mansa Dankaran Toumani, who was driven out of Dakajalan by Soumaoro Kante in the early 13th century. The word Kissidougou means a place of refuge in Malinke.

=== Refugee crisis ===
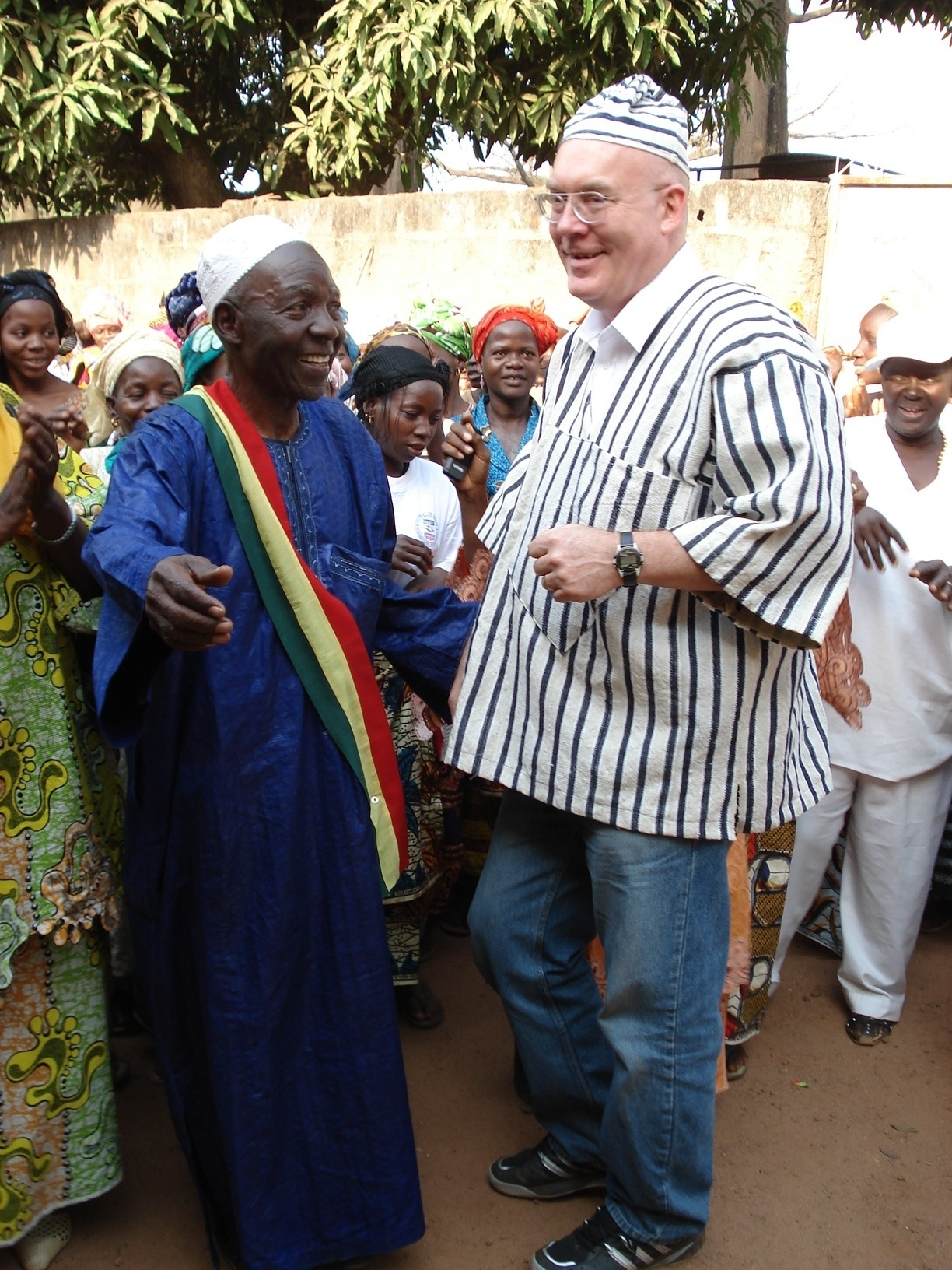
Paul Keita, mayor of Kissidougou

Throughout the 1990s, the government of Guinea, in cooperation with the United Nations High Commission for Refugees (UNHCR), provided international protection and assistance to Sierra Leonian and Liberian refugees residing along Guinea's southern border. In December 2000 and January 2001, a series of cross border attacks resulted in a massive shift in refugee (and Guinean) populations. Many fled to the Kissidougou and N'Zérékoré Prefectures in the Forest Region of Guinea. In February 2001, relocation of the Gueckédou and Faranah camps began with the transfer of temporary refugee settlements to new camps in the Albadariah sub-prefecture of Kissidougou.

Throughout 2001, there were more than 400,000 refugees in Guinea, many in Kissidougou. This massive influx of Sierra Leonian refugees placed great stress on the government of Guinea as well as upon international aid organizations' ability to provide a stable, secure refuge. There were widespread accounts of sexual violence throughout the camps, despite the best efforts of the international relief organizations.

== Ethnic Makeup ==
The Kouranko, a subgroup of the Malinke people, are the largest local ethnic group. Besides them and the Kissi, there are many other ethnic groups living in Kissidougou, including the Malinké and Fula. Many Loma people live in this region as well, especially between Kissidougou and Macenta.

The Guinean musician and singer Mory Kanté was from Kissidougou.

== Climate ==
Kissidougou has a tropical savanna climate (Köppen climate classification Aw).

Climate data for Kissidougou
Month	Jan	Feb	Mar	Apr	May	Jun	Jul	Aug	Sep	Oct	Nov	Dec	Year
Mean daily maximum °C (°F)	35.0 (95.0)	36.7 (98.1)	36.8 (98.2)	35.7 (96.3)	34.3 (93.7)	31.7 (89.1)	30.2 (86.4)	30.5 (86.9)	31.1 (88.0)	31.6 (88.9)	32.4 (90.3)	33.5 (92.3)	33.3 (91.9)
Daily mean °C (°F)	22.5 (72.5)	24.5 (76.1)	26.9 (80.4)	26.5 (79.7)	25.6 (78.1)	24.6 (76.3)	23.8 (74.8)	23.8 (74.8)	24.1 (75.4)	24.4 (75.9)	24.0 (75.2)	22.3 (72.1)	24.4 (75.9)
Mean daily minimum °C (°F)	8.5 (47.3)	10.9 (51.6)	14.6 (58.3)	18.0 (64.4)	17.9 (64.2)	17.9 (64.2)	17.9 (64.2)	18.2 (64.8)	17.6 (63.7)	16.8 (62.2)	13.6 (56.5)	9.3 (48.7)	15.1 (59.2)
Average rainfall mm (inches)	7 (0.3)	26 (1.0)	46 (1.8)	129 (5.1)	206 (8.1)	257 (10.1)	264 (10.4)	339 (13.3)	328 (12.9)	244 (9.6)	77 (3.0)	16 (0.6)	1,939 (76.3)
Average rainy days (≥ 1.0 mm)	1	2	4	9	16	18	19	21	22	18	7	1	138
Average relative humidity (%)	54	55	58	69	76	80	82	83	81	79	75	62	71
Source: NOAA

== Environment ==
Kissidougou’s landscape is primarily savanna, with patches of semi-deciduous humid forest. During the dry season, fires burn off the grasses and defoliate the few savanna trees within the savanna regions. The few forest patches left are considered “relics” of an originally extensive and dense forest cover. Deforestation is an urgent policy concern with local, regional, and global implications. At the local level, it leads to soil degradation, resulting in less productive and less sustainable agriculture. At the regional level, deforestation is thought to have caused irregularities in the downstream river flow of the Niger and in the rainfall watershed. Deforestation in Kissidougou also contributes to climate change. Historically and currently, social analyses have aimed to explain the causes and consequences of this environmental issue.

=== Degradation Narratives ===
Early analyses by French colonial botanist Auguste Chevalier attributed the increase in fire-setting to greater movement and trade in the post-occupation period. More recent studies, often funded by international environmental programs, have attributed deforestation to factors such as urban development, population growth, commercialization, and monetarization of the rural social environment. Each of these analyses contributed to the emerging narrative that Kissidougou once had an extensive forest cover, which was maintained by low population densities and by a functional social order whose regulations controlled and limited people’s inherently degrading land and vegetation use. Population growth and the breakdown of organized resource management under internal and external pressures have led to deforestation. Following this narrative, policy responses have been altered very little from the colonial period. Historically, policy has focused on reducing upland farming, controlling bushfires, regulating timber felling, and attempting forest reconstitution through tree planting. The narrative of environmental destruction/degradation justified the removal of the villagers' “control” over resources in favor of the state, leading to government administrations taking over resource tenure and regulating local use through permits, fines, and sometimes even military repression.

=== Counternarratives ===
In 1995, anthropologists James Fairhead and Melissa Leach challenged the degradation narrative that the inhabitants of Kissidougou are responsible for the decrease in forest cover. Historical evidence, including aerial photographs from 1952-53, descriptions and maps from the early French military occupation (1890s-1910), oral histories, and personal accounts, indicate that the vegetation pattern and forest cover in Kissidougou has remained relatively stable or even increased during these periods. Interviews conducted as part of the study included accounts of villagers establishing forest islands around their settlements and the formation of secondary forest thickets in the savanna. In 27 of the 38 villages Fairhead and Leach investigated, they report that “elders recounted how their ancestors had founded settlements in savanna and gradually encouraged the growth of forest around them.” This counters the interpretations that suggest forest loss due to local practices. Fairhead and Leach further cite earlier documentary sources from the 1780s-1860s to demonstrate that the forest cover is increased as a result of human intervention, rather than degraded. Oral history accounts also support this historical data.

Based on their historical research, Fairhead and Leach argue that the local land use can be both vegetation enriching as well as degrading. In Kissidougou, vegetation enrichment has often involved encouraging the formation of forest patches around their villages for various reasons. The Kissidougou villagers have accomplished this through both routine activities on the village periphery as well as intentional techniques. Routine activities include collecting thatch and fence grass, tethering cattle to reduce flammable grasses, and depositing household waste that fertilizes developing forest successions. Intentional methods involve planting trees that initiate forest growth and cultivating margins to establish soil conditions conducive to tree growth.

== Notable people ==
- Hadja Nima Bah (born 1927 or 1937), writer and politician.
- Fode Baro
