= Hadja =

Hadja is a given name. Notable people with the name include:

- Hadja Idrissa Bah (born 1999), Guinean activist
- Hadja Nima Bah (born 1927, or 1937), Guinean writer
- Hadja Cissé (born 1991), Senegalese handball player
- Hadja Djakagbè Kaba, Guinean politician
- Hadja Saran Daraba Kaba (born 1945), Guinean activist
- Hadja Lahbib (born 1970), Belgian journalist
- Hadja Fatimata Ouattara, Burkina Faso politician
- Cissé Hadja Mariama Sow (born 1942), Guinean politician
