= Beindou =

Beindou may refer to:

- Beindou, Kissidougou, Guinea
- Beindou, Faranah, Guinea
