= Bardou, France =

Bardou, France may refer to:

- Bardou, Dordogne, commune in the Dordogne, France
- Bardou, Hérault, village in the Hérault, France
