= Gnaléah =

- Sub-prefecture and town
- Location in Guinea
- Coordinates: 9°58′N 10°32′W
- Country: Guinea
- Region: Faranah Region
- Prefecture: Faranah Prefecture

Population (2014)
  - Total: 15,221
- Time zone: UTC+0 (GMT)

Gnaléah is a town and sub-prefecture in the Faranah Prefecture in the Faranah Region of Guinea. As of 2014 it had a population of 15,221 people.
