= Banama =

- Sub-prefecture and town
- Location in Guinea
- Coordinates: 9°4′N 9°45′W
- Country: Guinea
- Region: Faranah Region
- Prefecture: Kissidougou Prefecture

Population (2014)
  - Total: 8,994
- Time zone: UTC+0 (GMT)

Banama (N'Ko: ߓߣߊߡߊ) is a town and sub-prefecture in the Kissidougou Prefecture in the Faranah Region of Guinea. As of 2014 it had a population of 8,994 people.
