= Firawa =

- Sub-prefecture and town
- Location in Guinea
- Coordinates: 9°13′N 9°47′W
- Country: Guinea
- Region: Faranah Region
- Prefecture: Kissidougou Prefecture

Population (2014)
  - Total: 11,407
- Time zone: UTC+0 (GMT)

Firawa is a town and sub-prefecture in the Kissidougou Prefecture in the Faranah Region of Guinea. As of 2014 it had a population of 11,407 people.
