= Sandéniah =

- Sub-prefecture and town
- Location in Guinea
- Coordinates: 10°09′N 11°03′W
- Country: Guinea
- Region: Faranah Region
- Prefecture: Faranah Prefecture

Population (2014)
  - Total: 17,454
- Time zone: UTC+0 (GMT)

Sandéniah is a town and sub-prefecture in the Faranah Prefecture in the Faranah Region of Guinea. As of 2014 it had a population of 17,454 people.
