= Sankiniana =

- Location in Guinea
- Coordinates: 10°47′N 10°11′W
- Country: Guinea
- Region: Faranah Region

Sankiniana is a town in the Faranah Region of Guinea.
