= Tiro, Guinea =

Tiro
- Sub-prefecture and town
- Location in Guinea
- Coordinates: 9°43′51″N 10°39′4″W
- Country: Guinea
- Region: Faranah Region
- Prefecture: Faranah Prefecture

Population (2014)
  - Total: 18,982
- Time zone: UTC+0 (GMT)

Tiro is a town and sub-prefecture in the Faranah Prefecture in the Faranah Region of Guinea. It lies on the upper reaches of the River Niger. As of 2014 it had a population of 18,982 people.

The terrain around Tiro is mainly flat. Tiro is located in a valley. The highest point nearby is 485 meters above sea level, 1.0 km northwest of Tiro. Around Tiro, it is sparsely populated, with 14 inhabitants per square kilometer. There are no other communities nearby. In the surroundings around Tiro grows mainly savanna forest . The Savanna climate prevails in the area. The average annual temperature in the neighborhood is 21 °C . The warmest month is February, when the average temperature is 25 °C, and the coldest is August, with 18 °C. average annual turnaround is 2,025 millimeters. The rainy month is September, with an average of 410 mm rainfall, and the driest is January, with 1 mm rainfall.
