= Gbangbadou =

- Sub-prefecture and town
- Location in Guinea
- Coordinates: 9°21′N 10°03′W
- Country: Guinea
- Region: Faranah Region
- Prefecture: Kissidougou Prefecture

Population (2014)
  - Total: 13,861
- Time zone: UTC+0 (GMT)

Gbangbadou is a town and sub-prefecture in the Kissidougou Prefecture in the Faranah Region of Guinea. As of 2014 it had a population of 13,861 people.
