= Yendé-Millimou =

- Sub-prefecture and town
- Location in Guinea
- Coordinates: 8°53′N 10°10′W
- Country: Guinea
- Region: Faranah Region
- Prefecture: Kissidougou Prefecture

Population (2014)
  - Total: 20,372
- Time zone: UTC+0 (GMT)

Yendé-Millimou is a sub-prefecture in the Kissidougou Prefecture in the Faranah Region of Guinea. It includes the settlements of Yendé and Millimou. As of 2014 it had a population of 20,372 people.
