= Sangardo =

- Sub-prefecture and town
- Location in Guinea
- Coordinates: 9°24′N 10°13′W
- Country: Guinea
- Region: Faranah Region
- Prefecture: Kissidougou Prefecture

Population (2014)
  - Total: 21,646
- Time zone: UTC+0 (GMT)

Sangardo is a town and sub-prefecture in the Kissidougou Prefecture in the Faranah Region of Guinea. As of 2014 it had a population of 21,646 people.
