= Kissi penny =

Historical currency from Sierra Leone

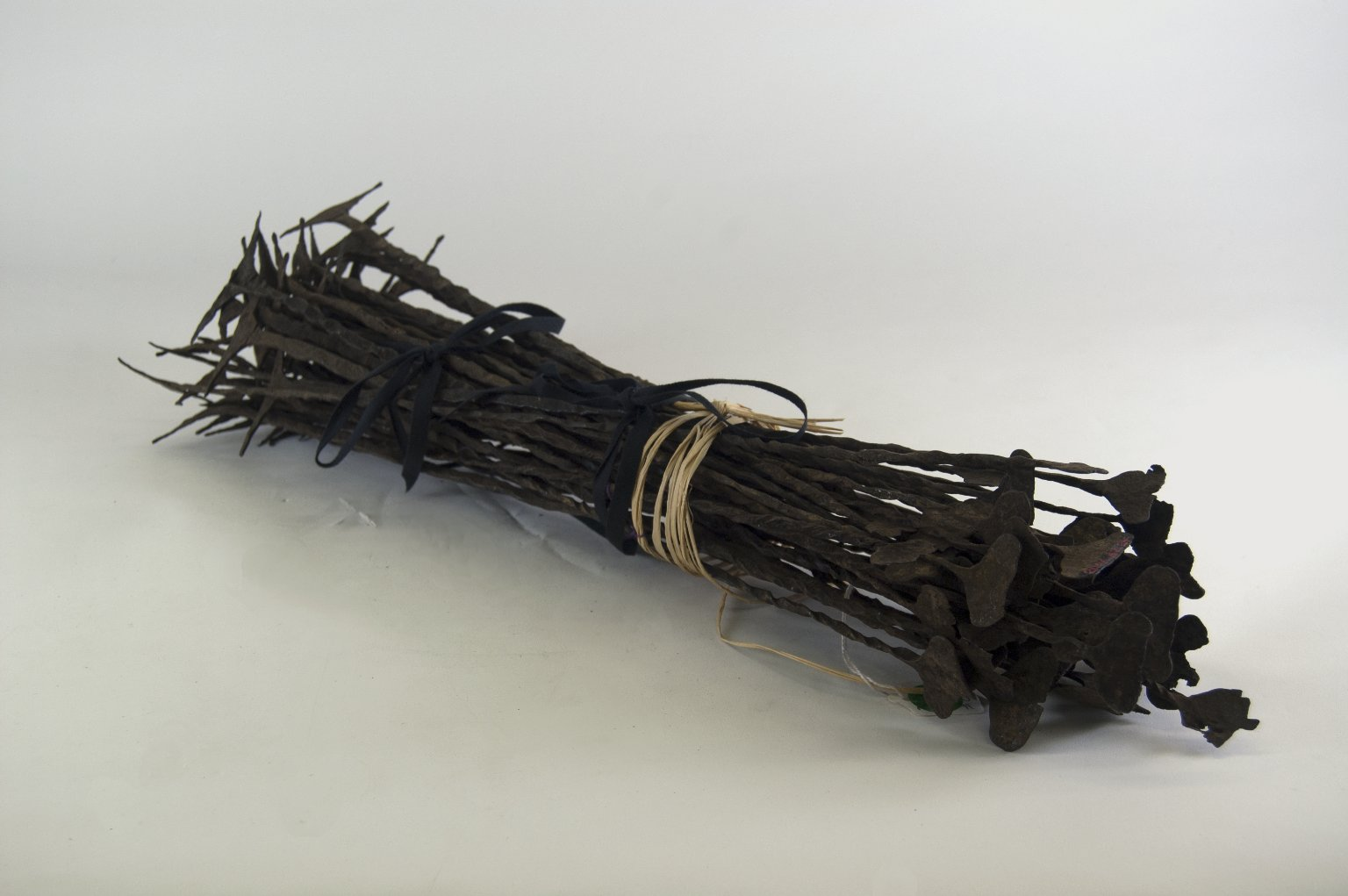
A bundle of Kissi pennies at the Brooklyn Museum.

The Kissi penny, also seen transcribed as kissy or kisi penny or known as guenze, koli, and kilindi, was an iron currency made in Sierra Leone that circulated widely in the immediate vicinity of its production among Gbandi (Bandi), Gola, Kissi, Kpelle, Loma, Mandinka and Mende and other people of Liberia, Sierra Leone, and Guinea-Conakry.

== Origin ==
West Africans from the region of modern-day Liberia and Sierra Leone have used iron as a trading good and standard of value for a long time. Iron working had developed in the region by ca. 600 B.C.E. and was of extremely high quality. Even in the early modern period, West African iron and steel easily exceeded the quality of European steel. However, the relative lack of available fuel meant that West African iron was expensive compared to European iron.

Portuguese records indicated that sailing voyages in the early sixteenth century carried iron bars among the trade good going farther north. During the period of the slave trade in the region, iron bars were a standard of payment and wealth. There is no reason to believe that these items were shaped as the Kissi penny was. Rather it seems that the currency began being manufactured in the specific form of the Kissi penny around 1880.

== Circulation ==
Due to the trading and nautical activities of the people of the region, especially the Kru, Kissi pennies circulated widely along the coast of West and Central Africa. Historical records do not note the use of this currency before the last years of the 19th century (c. 1880) and they continued in use as money until gradually replaced by colonial currencies, but were still in use as late as 1940 in Sierra Leone and even as late as the 1980s in Liberia.

== Production ==
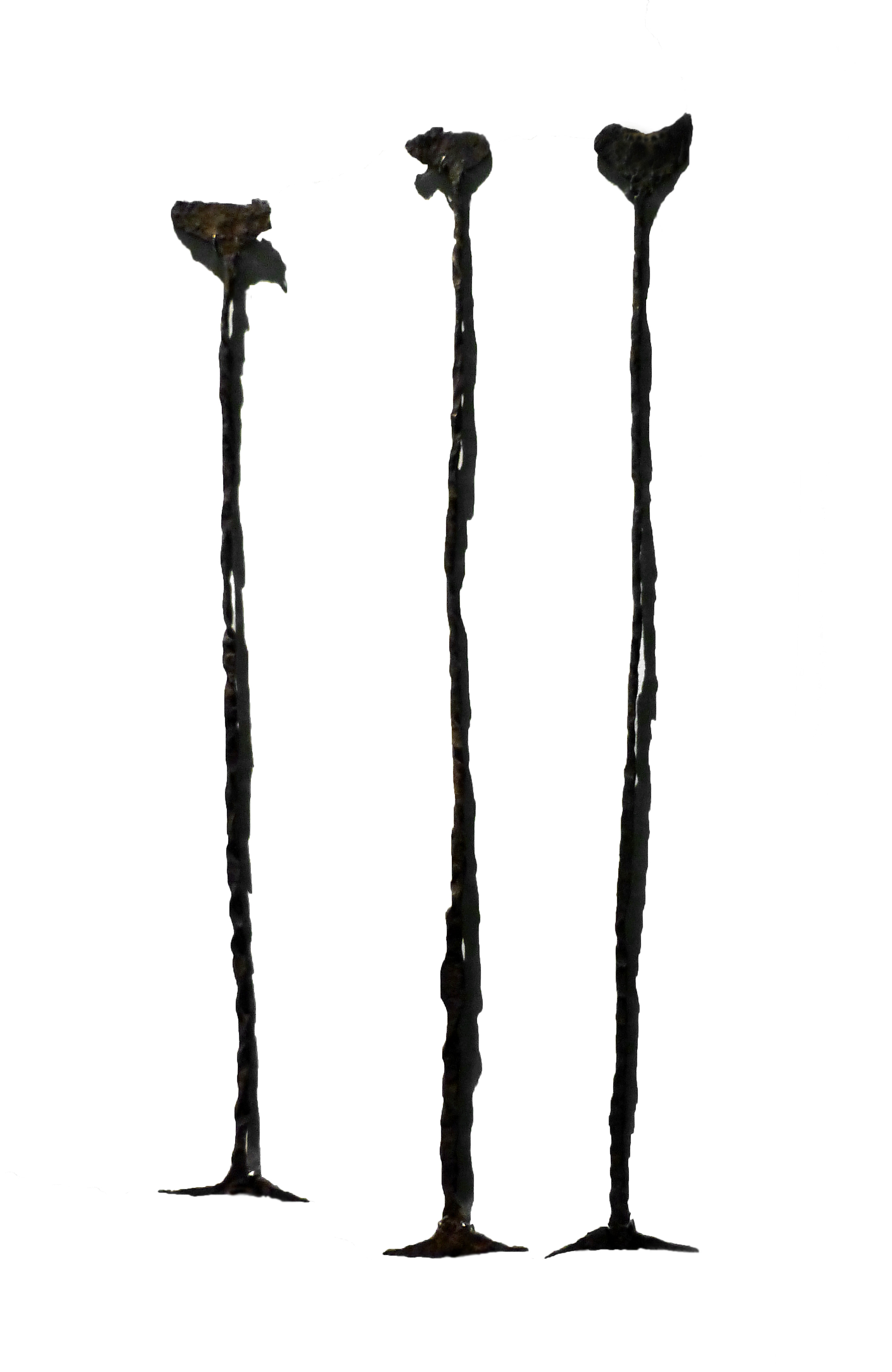
Individual Kissi pennies from the Musée des Confluences in France

Kissi pennies were made by smiths in the form of long rods, with a "T" on one end (called nling or "ear"), and a sort of blade, not unlike a hoe on the other end (called kodo or "foot"). They ranged in length from about 6 (15 cm) to as much as 16 inches (40 cm). A score of oranges or a bunch of bananas could be bought for two. Because each one had relatively small value, they were often gathered into bundles (usually of 20). Prices compiled in the early twentieth century put the cost of a cow, for example, at 100 bundles (around 2,000 total "pennies"), while bride price might be 200 bundles, and a slave, while the domestic slave trade was still operating, might sell for 300 bundles.

== Religious use ==
Even after they were discontinued for use as currency, Kissi pennies continued to be employed in the society of the region, for example, as tokens of completing rituals in the Poro and Sande Societies; as bridewealth, and also to be placed on tombs and graves, where they were believed to channel the souls of the dead. At some point, the currency acquired spiritual aspects, perhaps because of its use in graves, and as a result, when a penny broke it was considered without value until a Zoe, or religious practitioner, repaired it in a special ceremony. It was this feature that led to it being called "money with a soul."

European travelers regarded them as a curious form of primitive money, and as a result many were collected and deposited in museums. They continue to be sold on art and curio markets, as well as among numismatists to the present day.

== See also ==
- Cowry
- Katanga Cross, a similar currency used in Central Africa
- Manilla (money)

== Bibliography ==
- Béavogui, Facinet (2000). "Circulation monétaire en l'Afrique de l'Ouest: Le cas du guinzé (Guinėe, Liberia)," in Yasmine Marzouk, Christian Seignobos, François Sigaut, eds. Outils aratoires en Afrique: innovations, normes et traces. Paris: Karthala, pp. 175–190.
- Bunot, Raoul (1943). "Une monnaie de l'AOF le guinzé," Notes africaines 18: 2-3.
- Germann, Paul (1933) Die Volkesstämme in Norden von Liberia. Leipzig.
- Portières, Roland (1960). "La monnaie de fer dans l'ouest Africa au XX e siècle," Recherches africaines (Études guineénes), NS, 4: 3-13.
- Suret-Canale, Jean (1960). "A propos des guinzé en Guinée," Recherches africaines (Études guinéenes) NS, 2-3: 32-37.
