= Mama Diabaté =

Guinean singer and musician (1959–2023)

- Born: 1959; Banian, French Guinea, French West Africa
- Died: 5 December 2023 (aged 63); Conakry, Guinea
- Occupations: Singer; Musician

Mama Diabaté (1959 – 5 December 2023) was a Guinean singer and multi-instrument musician.

== Biography ==
Born in 1959 in Banian, Diabaté was a cousin of Sékou Diabaté. She began her career in 1970 and played music with six traditional instruments: the bolon, the kora, the dunun, the dan, the balafon, the djembe, and the guitar. She held numerous concerts in Africa, Europe, and the United States and recorded several albums. In 2002, she recorded an album titled Donkili Diarabi with her sisters Sona Diabaté and Sayon Diabaté. After living in Sierra Leone for several years, she returned to Guinea in 2021 to release an album.

Mama Diabaté died in Conakry on 5 December 2023, at the age of 63.

== Discography ==
Diabaté released three albums between 1993 and 1995.

- Koffi Cola Na Yo (1993)
- La Biche du Manding (1993)
- N'na niwalé (1995)
