= Kissidougou Airport =

Airport in Guinea

Kissidougou Airport Aéroport de Kissidougou (French)
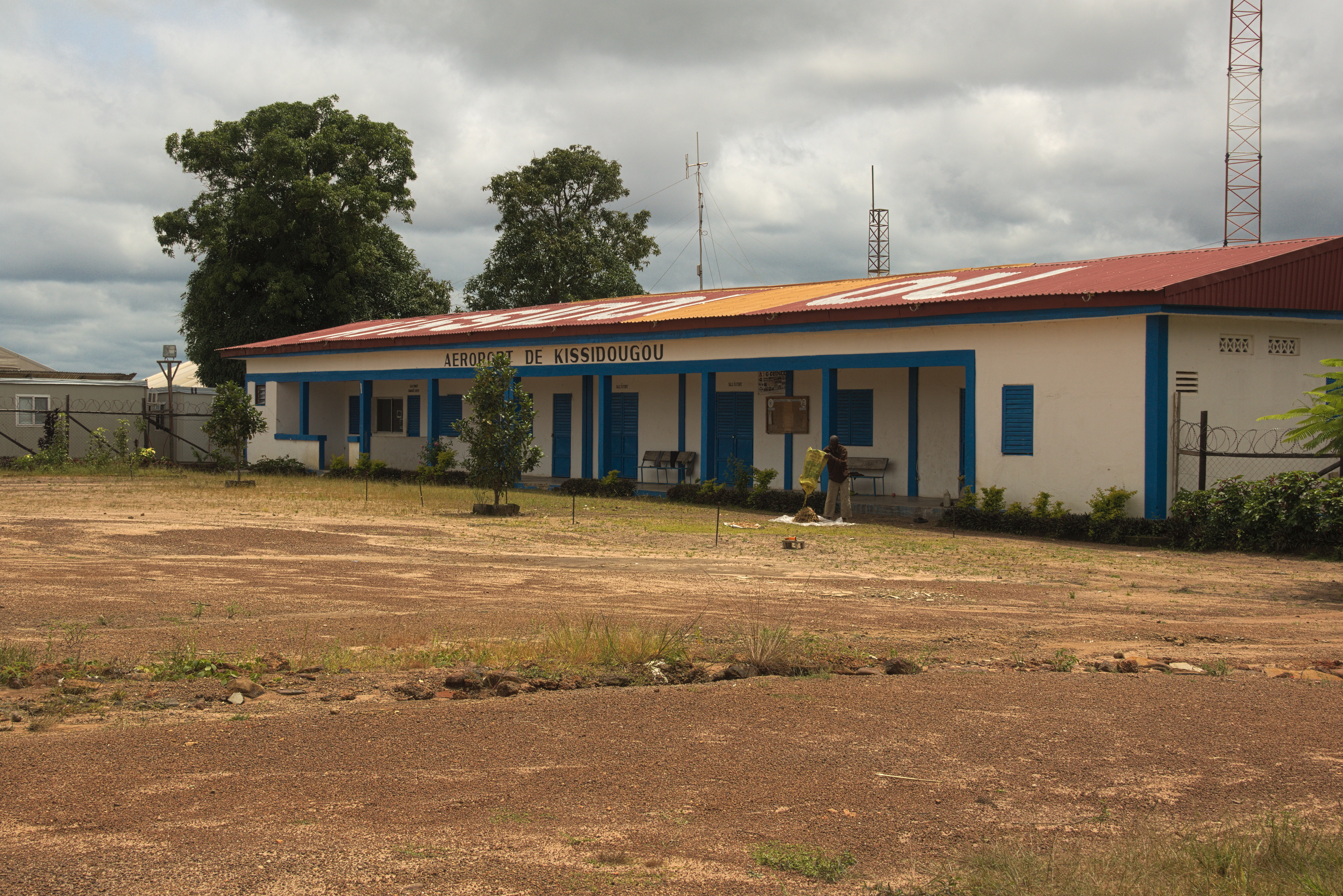

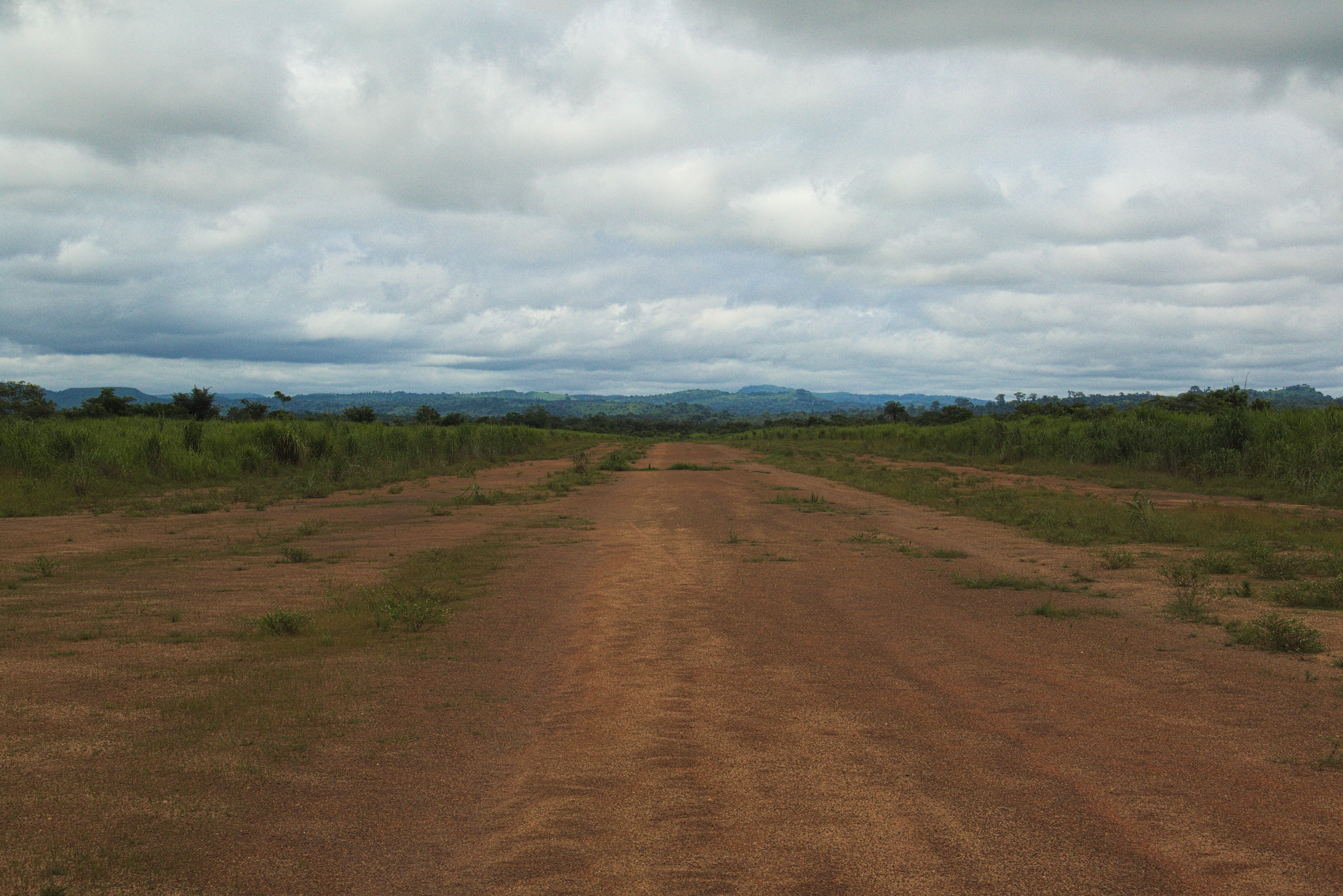
- IATA: KSI; ICAO: GUKU

Summary
- Airport type: Public
- Serves: Kissidougou, Guinea
- Elevation AMSL: 1,808 ft / 551 m
- Coordinates: 9°09′40″N 10°07′30″W

Map
- Location of the airport in Guinea

Runways
Direction	Length		Surface
Direction	m	ft	Surface
01/19	1,805	5,922	Dirt
- Source: Google Maps GCM

Kissidougou Airport (IATA: KSI, ICAO: GUKU) is an airport serving Kissidougou, a city in the Faranah Region of Guinea. The airport is 3 kilometres (1.9 mi) southwest of the city.

The Kissidougou non-directional beacon (Ident: KU) is located on the field.

== Accidents and incidents ==
- On 16 January 1984, Douglas C-47 9Q-CYD of Transport Aérien Zairois departed the runway following an engine failure on take-off. Dry grass was set on fire when it came into contact with the hot engine and the aircraft was subsequently destroyed by fire. All seventeen people on board escaped uninjured. The aircraft was operating a non-scheduled passenger flight in support of the Dakar Rally.

== See also ==
- Transport in Guinea
- List of airports in Guinea
