= Bendugu =

Bendugu may refer to:

- Beindou, Faranah
- Bendugu, Sierra Leone
- Bendougou, a region of Mali and former province of the Mali Empire
