= Tamba Borbor-Sawyer =

Sierra Leonean politician and police officer

Tamba Borbor-Sawyer is a Sierra Leonean politician and a retired officer in the Sierra Leone Police. He was a member of the third parliament from the opposition Sierra Leone People's Party (SLPP) representing Kailahun District, but was suspended from the party in 2010 after taking up a cabinet position in the government led by the All People's Congress.

Borbor-Sawyer is a member of the Kissi ethnic group.
