= List of museums in Guinea =

This is a list of museums in Guinea.

== Museums in Guinea ==
- Musée National de Sandervalia
- Musée Préfectoral de Boké
- Musée Préfectoral de Kankan
- Musée Préfectoral de Kissidougou
- Musée Préfectoral de Koundara
- Musée Préfectoral de N'zerekore
- Petit Musée du Fouta

== See also ==
- List of museums
