= Kai Abdul Foday =

Sierra Leonean politician (1924–2013)

Kai Abdul Foday (2 March 1924 – 29 March 2013) was a Sierra Leonean politician who served as member of Sierra Leone's parliament representing his hometown of Kono District. He was a member of the Sierra Leone People's Party (SLPP).

== Life and career ==
Kai Abdul Foday was born on 2 March 1924, in Kamiendor, Mafindor Chiefdom, Kono District. He came from the Kissi ethnic group.

He was first elected to parliament in the 2002 general elections, he again won re-election in the 2007 general election, although his political party, the SLPP presidential candidate Solomon Berewa lost the presidential election to the APC presidential candidate, Ernest Bai Koroma.

Kai died in Freetown on 29 March 2013, at the age of 89.
