= Kissidougou Prefecture =

Coordinates: 9°11′13″N 10°06′25″W

- Prefecture
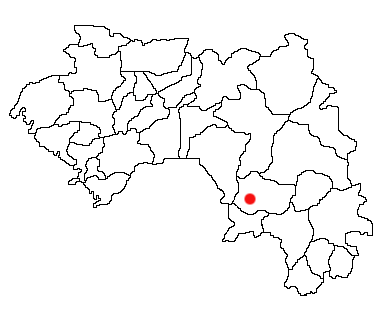
- Location of Kissidougou Prefecture and seat in Guinea
- Country: Guinea
- Region: Faranah Region
- Capital: Kissidougou

Area
  - Total: 8,300 km^{2} (3,200 sq mi)

Population (2014 census)
  - Total: 283,609
  - Density: 34/km^{2} (88/sq mi)
- Time zone: UTC+0 (Guinea Standard Time)

Kissidougou (N'Ko: ߞߛߌ߬ߘߎ߯ ߡߙߊ߬ߓߊ߰ߘߊ߮) is a prefecture located in the Faranah Region of Guinea. The capital is Kissidougou. The prefecture covers an area of 8,300 km² and has a population of 283,609.

The prefecture is largely savanna but villages are usually surrounded by semi-deciduous humid forests, termed “forest islands.” The composition, management, and use of these forests change based on the socioeconomic conditions and commercial signals experienced by the villages (e.g., being used as fortresses during warfare and growing coffee or fruit depending on market prices).

It was originally thought that the forest islands were remnants of a previous forest that was degraded into savanna by human activity. The forests surrounding villages were thought to be left behind for protection, shelter for tree crops, and seclusion for rituals. This drew internationally and bilaterally funded environmental programs to the region to determine causes of forest degradation. Among the causes identified were modern development, historic cultural practices, and peasant use of the land. Policies were created to prevent further forest destruction because it was linked to soil degradation and climate change and thought to cause river flow and rainfall irregularities. These policies include switching from upland to swamp farming; externally imposed bushfire prohibitions, regulations, and practices; prohibiting the felling of protected tree species; and tree planting in village territories.

These explanations, however, were trying to explain a trend that was opposite to what was actually occurring. An analysis of aerial photographs of the region from 1952 to 1994 by James Fairhead and Melissa Leach found that the forest islands had mainly remained stable, formed, or enlarged, contrary to popular belief. Landscape descriptions and maps from early French military occupation (roughly 1890s to 1910), documentary sources from the 1780s to 1860s, and village elders’ accounts of their ancestors encouraging forest growth around savanna settlements also demonstrate the trend of growing forest islands occurring before the 1950s. This forest growth was promoted through everyday activities in the village margin land (e.g., grass gathering, cattle tethering, and household waste disposal) as well as deliberate forest cultivation (e.g., planting forest-initiating trees and cultivating the soil to be suitable for trees). Farming and fire practices were found to maintain the forest cover, upgrade soils and vegetation to be suitable for forests, and reduce the risk of devastating fires.

== Sub-prefectures ==
The prefecture is divided administratively into 13 sub-prefectures:

1. Kissidougou-Centre
2. Albadaria
3. Banama
4. Bardou
5. Beindou
6. Fermessadou-Pombo
7. Firawa
8. Gbangbadou
9. Kondiadou
10. Manfran
11. Sangardo
12. Yendé-Millimou
13. Yombiro
