= Musée Préfectoral de Kissidougou =

- Location: Kissidougou, Guinea
- Coordinates: 9.188°N 10.0977°W
- Collections: masks

The Musée Préfectoral de Kissidougou is a regional museum in Kissidougou, Guinea. Created in 1971, it is noted for its collection of masks, which are believed to have magical powers.

In a 2019 interview, the museum director discussed a major renovation of the museum.

== See also ==
- List of museums in Guinea
