= Albadaria =

- Sub-prefecture and town
- Location in Guinea
- Coordinates: 9°33′N 10°06′W
- Country: Guinea
- Region: Faranah Region
- Prefecture: Kissidougou Prefecture

Population (2014)
  - Total: 17,147
- Time zone: UTC+0 (GMT)

Albadaria (N'Ko: ߒߞߏ) is a town and sub-prefecture in the Kissidougou Prefecture in the Faranah Region of Guinea. As of 2014 it had a population of 17,147 people.

== Notable residents ==
- Mory Kanté (1950–2020), Guinean singer and musician
