= Richard and William King =

Merchant company in Bristol, England (c.1833–1920s)

Richard and William King Ltd was an English merchant company founded by the brothers William and Richard King in Bristol. Both brothers had previously been partners with their father, Thomas King. The initial partnership bought a 158-ton sailing ship named John Cabot to trade but it was later abandoned in Freetown after too much leakage.

== History ==
In 1833, Thomas King divested from the venture and the new partnership became known as William and Richard King Ltd. Though, Thomas King had trading interests in the Americas and Europe, the two brothers concentrated largely on the West African coast. The firm gained experience in trade between Bristol and the coast of West Africa and by 1840, it had grown larger, controlling 8 vessels. In 1841 when Thomas King died, a new ship was bought and christened the African Queen, African Queen took its first voyage within a year returning with elephant tusks, palm oil and coconut in exchange for manillas. The firm initially concentrated along the coast of Côte d'Ivoire which was away from the dominating merchant firms from Liverpool that concentrated in the Niger Delta known for its rich but more expensive palm oil . But beginning in the early 1840s, the company began to move further east towards Gabon, the Bight of Biafra and Dahomey where it carved a trading post along the Cameroon River. To placate some of the African chiefs, it procured a large umbrella and a dressing case made by a silversmith and filled it with cosmetics to be used as gifts. The firm was never as substantial compared to a few other European merchants in the Cameroons and the Bight of Biafra but it had a major trading post in the Cameroon River and had a significant presence in the area. One of its representative was in Bonny when Jaja of Opobo led a faction in Bonny to form a new settlement called Opobo and in the 1880s, the firm was among a group of British firms that opposed Jaja. The firm adopted the 'coasting' system which unlike the Liverpool firms that berths at a location for months, William and King ships skims the coast of West Africa distributing 'trust', manillas or other medium of exchange in its frequent stops before turning back to collect goods after its journey through the coast. The firm was also able to diversify its risks through this practice. By the 1850s, the firm's concentration in the British palm oil market was 12%. The brothers success was also helped by their base in Bristol, they were the leading palm oil merchant in Bristol and had advantage over competitors in the regional markets at South Wales, the Midlands and Birmingham. In addition, Bristol was also a top producer of clothes, gunpowder and other articles of trade exported to West Africa. But by the 1860s, the palm oil business was becoming less lucrative, competitive oils were discovered in America and prices began to level off. The entry of shipping services through steamships also introduced a new form of competition, prior traders were both the owners of the ships and cargoes in the ships but the new steamships divided the trade along functional lines and introduced a cheaper rate that enticed small scale traders into the market.

By the 1880s, the firm was under the management of Mervyn King, son of William King and had grown to become a major British firm in the area that was able to withstand the partition of the continent and an economic depression. In 1889, their Niger Delta business was merged with other traders to form the African Association Ltd and in the 1920s, the remainder of their business was purchased by Lever Brothers.

== The brothers ==
In 1835, Richard King became a Councillor for Redcliffe and in 1845, he was Mayor of Bristol, his great-grandfather, John King was a previous mayor. King's chief interest was in the docks of Bristol, he led a campaign to enable the Bristol council to take over operations of the docks from the Merchant Venturers and in 1848, he became the chairman of the docks committee after the council's successful takeover. In 1851, he became a master of the Society of Merchant Venturers.
