= Kissi people =

West African ethnolinguistic group

Kissi
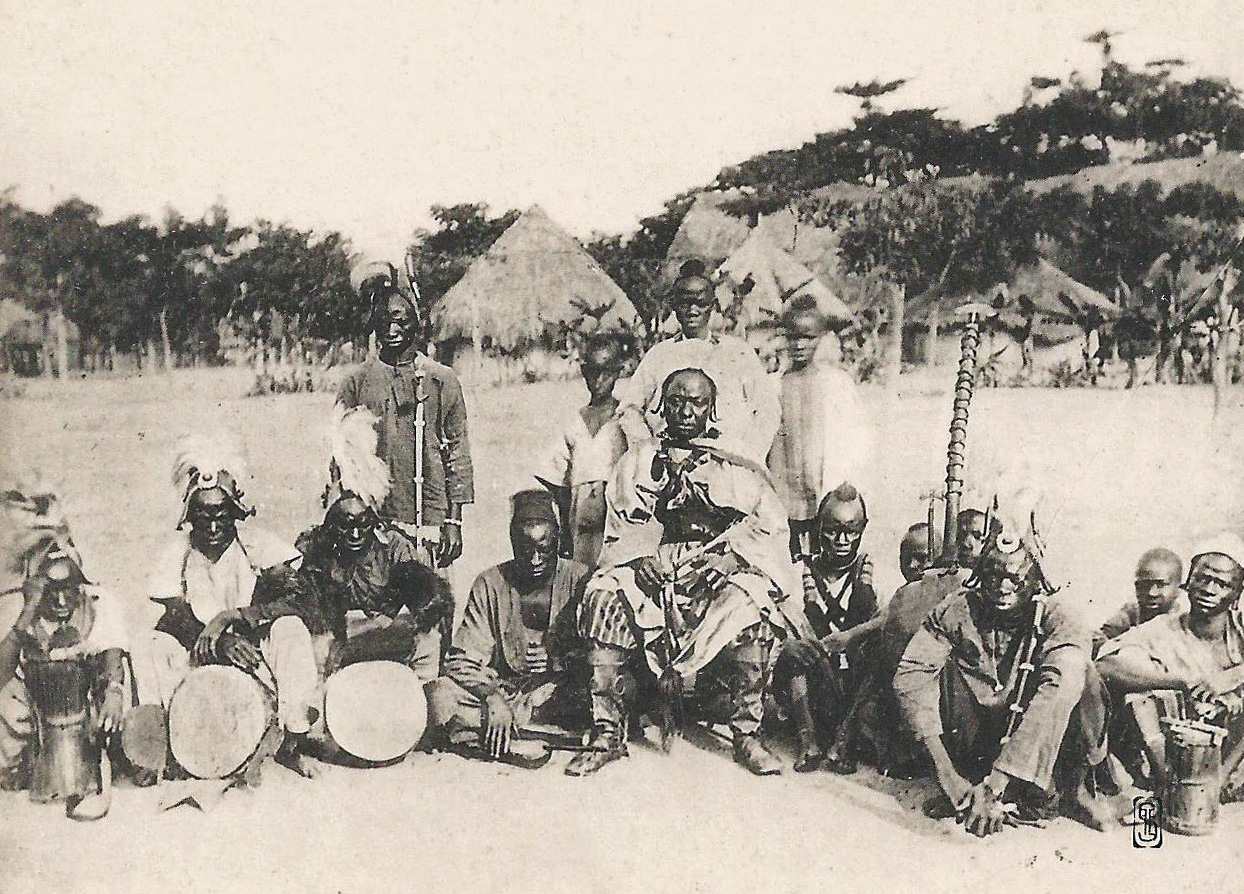
- Orchestra of Kissi musicians in 1900

Total population
- c. 1,224,545

Regions with significant populations
- Guinea: 798,429 (6.2%)
- Liberia: 250,273 (4.8%)
- Sierra Leone: 175,843 (4.5%)

Languages
- Kissi, French, English, Krio

Religion
- Christianity, Traditional, Islam

Related ethnic groups
- Mende people, Loma people, Kpelle people, Mano people, Kono people, Vai people, Gbandi people

The Kissi people are a West African ethnolinguistic group. They are the fourth largest ethnic group in Guinea, making up 6.2% of the population. Kissi people are also found in Liberia and Sierra Leone. They speak the Kissi language, which belongs to the Mel branch of the Niger–Congo language family. The Kissi are well known for making baskets and weaving on vertical looms. In past times, they were also famous for their ironworking skills, as the country and its neighbors possessed rich iron deposits. Kissi smiths produced the "Kissi penny."

The Kissi people are also called Assi, Bakoa, Den, Gihi, Gisi, Gissi, Gizi, Kisi, Kisia, Kisie, Kisiye, Kizi, or Kalen

== History ==
According to The Peoples of Africa, Kissi tradition considers that before the seventeenth century, they inhabited the Upper Niger region. Supposedly, they lived south of the Futa Jallon until the Yalunka people expelled them. After 1600, they migrated westward, expelling the Limbas in their march, but were under constant threat from the Kurankos.

=== Resistance to French conquest by Kissi Kaba Keita ===
In Guinea, the Kissi warrior Kissi Kaba Keita managed to unite many Kissi chiefdoms under his reign and resist French conquest for many years. Before French attacks, he had rallied the Kurankos of Morige and the Leles of Yombiro. When the French arrived in 1892, he had to let the relatively autonomous chiefs of the respective areas defend themselves. Due to the French's technological superiority, Kissi Kaba resorted mainly to guerilla tactics, thus delaying their conquest of his kingdom. Still, by 1893, he realized that his resistance would fail and subjected himself to the French, who recognized him as chief of the northern Kissi territory. However, his relationship with the French gradually worsened, leading to them appointing his rivals in several of his chiefdoms and eventually to his execution in Siguiri.

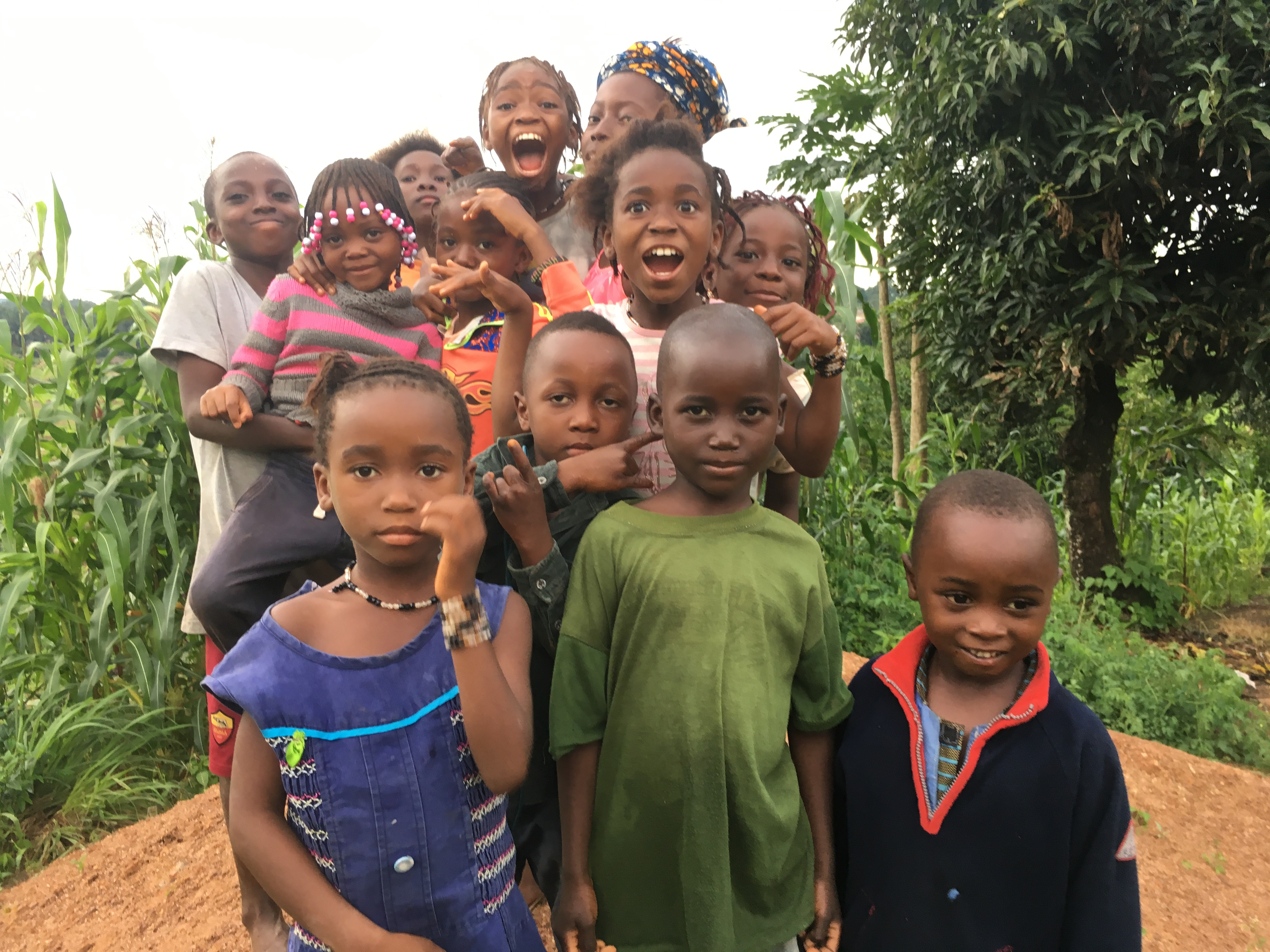
Kissi children in Kissidougou (2019)

== Religion and spiritual beliefs ==
Although many Kissi have converted to Christianity, most continue practicing their traditional ethnic religion. Ancestor worship or praying to deceased relatives is common among the Kissi. The Kissi people produced many carved soapstone figures and heads before colonial contact with the Europeans. It is unclear why they were made; some scholars argue that they form part of ancestor worship, while others say they may represent gods to increase agricultural yields. A large number can be seen in the British Museum's collection.

== Surnames ==
1. Balladouno
2. Beindouno
3. Bengoutieno
4. Boakai
5. Bolossiandouno
6. Bongono
7. Bongouno
8. Bouédouno
9. Boundouno
10. Bourouno
11. Bramadouno
12. Cécémadouno
13. Danfagadouno
14. Dembadouno
15. Doufangadouno
16. Dougbouno
17. Dougouno
18. Douno
19. Doussandouno
20. Fallah
21. Fancinadouno
22. Fangadouno
23. Fangamadouno
24. Fayiah
25. Feindouno
26. Foryoh
27. Fouédouno
28. Foulo
29. Frangadouno
30. Fremessadouno
31. Gbandélno
32. Iffono
33. Irandouno
34. Kabadouno
35. Kadouno
36. Kagbadouno
37. Kakpadouno
38. Kamano
39. Kamadouno
40. Kambadouno
41. Kambedouno
42. Kandawadouno
43. Kankadouno
44. Kankodouno
45. Kantabadouno
46. Kantambadouno
47. Kassadouno
48. Kassossodouno
49. Késsémadouno
50. Kikano
51. Kogbadouno
52. Kombadouno
53. Komano
54. Kondano
55. Kondiano
56. Kondouno
57. Koniono
58. Kotémbadouno
59. Kotémbèdouno
60. Koumassadouno
61. Koumbadouno
62. Koundiano
63. Koundouno
64. Kouteno
65. Lélano
66. Léno
67. Malano
68. Mamadouno
69. Mamboliano
70. Mandouno
71. Mano
72. Mansadouno
73. Massadouno
74. Massandouno
75. Millimono
76. Millimouno
77. Mongono
78. Moudékéno
79. Moundékéno
80. Moussatèmbèdouno
81. Nyumah
82. Oliano
83. Ouamono
84. Ouamouno
85. Ouéndeno
86. Ouéndouno
87. Sagno
88. Sandouno
89. Saninkoundouno
90. Sayadouno
91. Sayandouno
92. Semadouno
93. Sembèno
94. Sevadouno
95. Sewadouno
96. Simbiano
97. Solano
98. Somadouno
99. Somodouno
100. Sondouno
101. Songbono
102. Sossoadouno
103. Sossouadouno
104. Souadouno
105. Soumadouno
106. Soumano
107. Soyadouno
108. Soyandouno
109. Tagbino
110. Tamba
111. Tambadouno
112. Tédouno
113. Teliano
114. Tèmbèdouno
115. Tèmèssadouno
116. Teinguiano
117. Teinkiano
118. Tiguiano
119. Togbadouno
120. Togbodouno
121. Toguiano
122. Tolno
123. Tonguino
124. Toumadouno
125. Toumandouno
126. Toundoufédouno
127. Toundouno
128. Tounguino
129. Woromadouno
130. Woromandouno
131. Yassadou
132. Yaradouno
133. Yarandouno
134. Yilandouno
135. Yokrodouno
136. Yombouno
137. Youmbouno
138. Zéno

== Notable Kissi people ==
- Joseph Boakai, Liberian politician & current President of Liberia
- Henri Camara, Senegalese footballer
- Maxime Camara, Guinean footballer
- Benjamin Feindouno, Guinean footballer
- Pascal Feindouno, Guinean footballer
- Simon Feindouno, Guinean footballer
- Kai Abdul Foday, former Sierra Leonean politician
- Tamba Hali, Liberian and former defensive end for the Kansas City Chiefs
- Elie Kamano, Guinean musician
- François Kamano, Guinean footballer
- Victor Kantabadouno, Guinean footballer
- Sahr Senesie, German footballer
- Kissi Kaba Keita, a warrior who resisted French conquest from 1892
- Claude Kory Kondiano, Guinean politician and former Speaker of the House from 13 January 2014 to 22 April 2020.
- Augustine Kortu, Sierra Leonean politician
- Sékou Koundouno, Guinean activist
- Kai Londo, Kissi warrior in southern Sierra Leone.
- Jean Paul Millimono, Guinean musician
- Faya Lansana Millimouno, Guinean politician
- Tom Nyuma, a retired colonel in the Sierra Leonean Armed Forces and the current council chair of Kailahun District
- Tamba Borbor-Sawyer, Sierra Leonean politician and a retired officer in the Sierra Leone Police.
- Emmanuel Tolno, Guinean footballer
- Sia Tolno, Guinean musician
- Koumba Aviane Tonguino, Guinean musician
