= Faranah Prefecture =

Coordinates: 10°02′20″N 10°43′12″W

- Prefecture
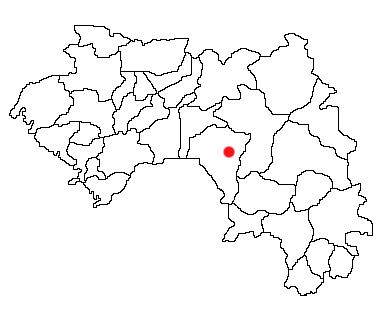
- Location of Faranah Prefecture and seat in Guinea.
- Country: Guinea
- Region: Faranah Region
- Capital: Faranah

Area
  - Total: 12,966 km^{2} (5,006 sq mi)

Population (2014 census)
  - Total: 280,511
  - Density: 21.634/km^{2} (56.033/sq mi)
- Time zone: UTC+0 (Guinea Standard Time)

Faranah (N’ko: ߝߙߊߣߊ߫߫) is a prefecture located in the Faranah Region of Guinea. The capital is Faranah. The prefecture covers an area of 12,966 km^{2} and has an estimated population of 280,511.

== Sub-prefectures ==
The prefecture is divided administratively into 12 sub-prefectures:

1. Faranah-Centre
2. Banian
3. Beindou
4. Gnaléah
5. Hérémakonon
6. Kobikoro
7. Marela
8. Passayah
9. Sandéniah
10. Songoyah
11. Tindo
12. Tiro
