= Banian, Guinea =

Banian
- Sub-prefecture and town
- Location in Guinea
- Coordinates: 9°36′3″N 10°32′29″W
- Country: Guinea
- Region: Faranah Region
- Prefecture: Faranah Prefecture

Population (2014)
  - Total: 36,445
- Time zone: UTC+0 (GMT)

Banian is a town and sub-prefecture in the Faranah Prefecture in the Faranah Region of Guinea. As of 2014 it had a population of 36,445 people.
