= Liana bridge =

Suspended bridge made of liana vines

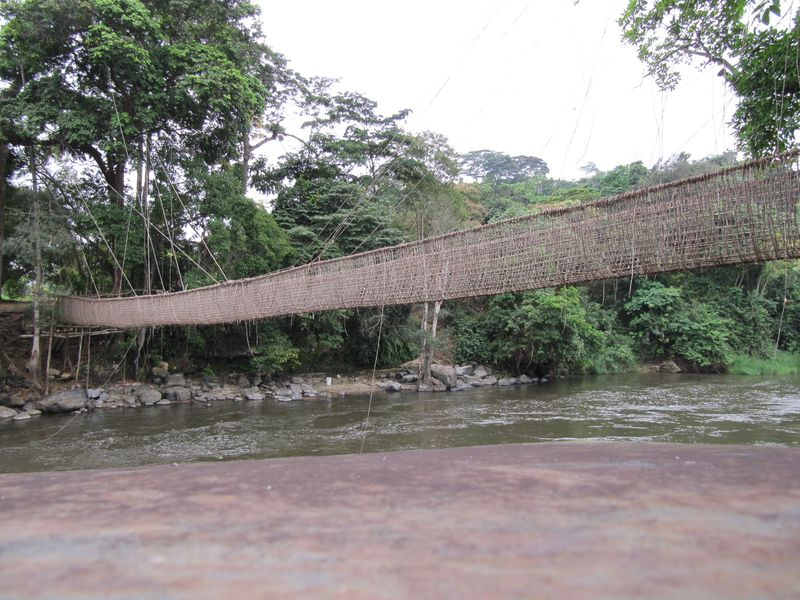
Liana bridge of Poubara, south of Franceville (Gabon)

A liana bridge is a suspended bridge made of liana vines. These bridges are most widespread in the tropical climates of Latin America, Africa and South-East Asia.

The liana Bridge of Poubara, south of Franceville (Gabon), was first completed in 1915. A new one is built each year, and it takes three months to complete.
