= Mory Kanté =

Guinean musician (1950–2020)

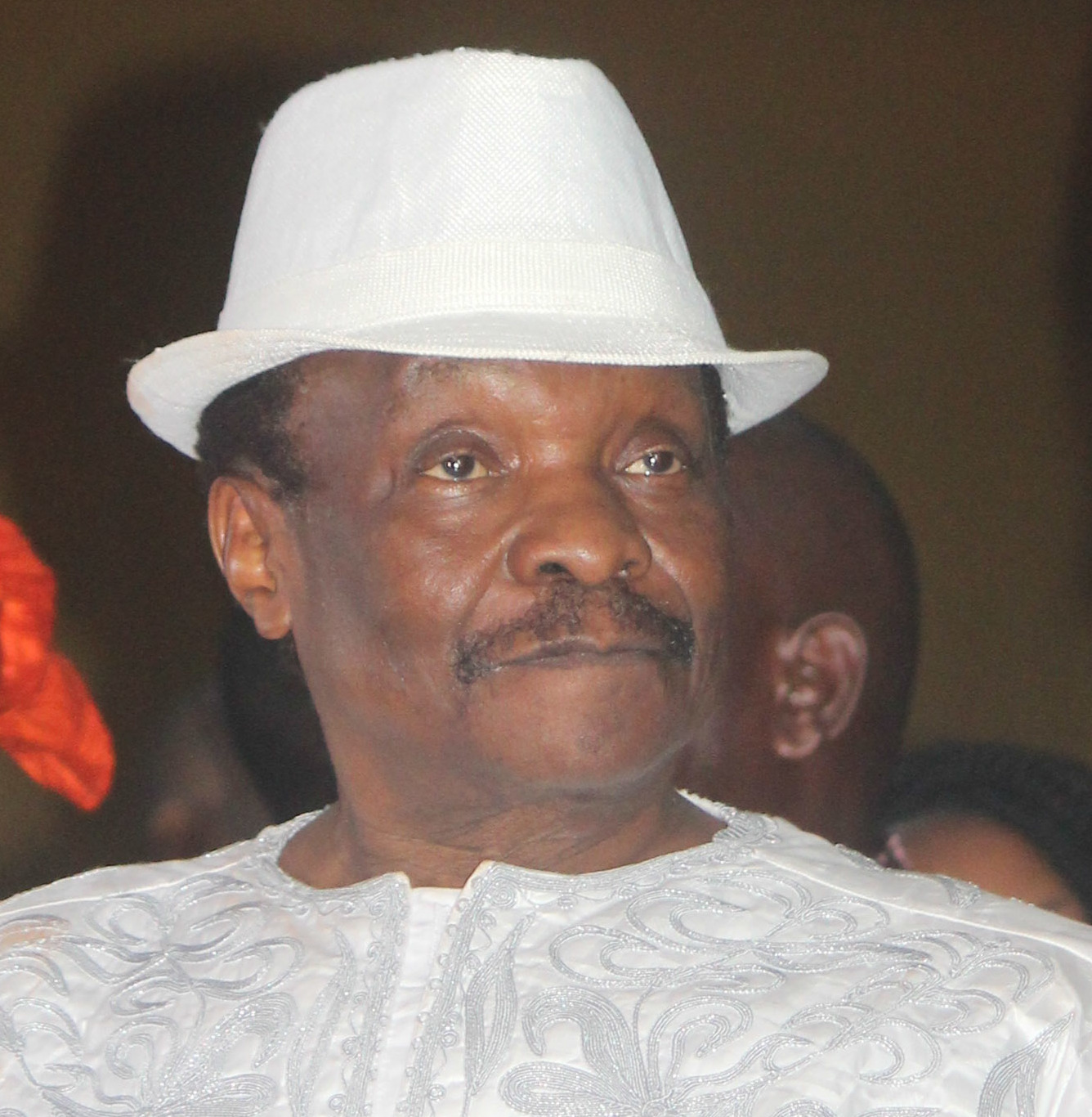
- Kanté in 2019

Background information
- Born: 29 March 1950; Albadaria, French Guinea
- Died: 22 May 2020 (aged 70) Conakry, Guinea
- Genres: Afro-pop; griot; house; Islamic; technopop; world
- Occupations: Singer, songwriter
- Instruments: Vocals, kora
- Years active: 1971–2020
- Website: www.morykante.com

Mory Kanté (29 March 1950 – 22 May 2020) was a Guinean vocalist and player of the kora harp. He was best known internationally for his 1987 hit song "Yé ké yé ké", which reached number one in Belgium, Finland, the Netherlands and Spain. The album it came from, Akwaba Beach, was the best-selling African record of its time.

== Early life ==
Kanté was born in Albadaria, French Guinea (a part of French West Africa at the time) on 29 March 1950. His father was El Hadj Djeli Fodé Kanté and his mother, Fatouma Kamissoko, was a singer. They were one of Guinea's best-known families of griot (hereditary) musicians. He was of mixed Malian and Guinean descent. After being brought up in the Mandinka griot tradition in Guinea, he was sent at the age of seven to Mali, where he learned to play the kora, as well as important voice traditions, some of which are necessary to become a griot. As a Muslim, he integrated aspects of Islamic music in his work.

== Career ==
In 1971, Kanté became a member of the Rail Band, in which Salif Keita was a singer. Keïta left the band in 1973, leaving Kanté as the singer.

In 1987, he released the song "Yé ké yé ké", which was one of Africa's best-ever-selling hits, as well as being a European number one in 1988, making it the first African single to sell more than one million copies. The album it came from, Akwaba Beach, became the best-selling African record of its time. The album also featured an Islamic song, "Inch Allah", alongside the pop hit "Yé ké yé ké". The album also featured the song "Tama", which inspired two Indian Bollywood songs, "Tamma Tamma" in Thanedaar (1990) and "Jumma Chumma" in Hum (1991), the latter film also featuring another song titled "Ek Doosre Se" that was inspired by "Inch Allah".

Kanté received unexpected fame again in 1994 when the German techno duo Hardfloor created a dance remix of "Yéké Yéké". He also appeared in 2006 as vocalist on British DJ Darren Tate's release, "Narama".

On 16 October 2001, Kanté was nominated Goodwill Ambassador of the Food and Agriculture Organization of the United Nations (FAO). He participated in that year's World Food Day ceremony at the FAO's headquarters in Rome, alongside fellow singers Majida El Roumi, Gilberto Gil and Albano Carrisi (who were also nominated as ambassadors).

Kanté was among Africa's top musicians—including Tiken Jah Fakoly, Amadou & Mariam and the rapper Didier Awadi—who banded together for the recording of "Africa Stop Ebola", a song offering advice aimed at raising awareness in the wake of the Ebola crisis. The song, released in November 2014, transcended public service announcements and sold 250,000 copies, with all proceeds going to medical charity Medecins Sans Frontieres (MSF).

== Death ==
Kanté died on 22 May 2020 at a hospital in Conakry, aged 70. He had been suffering from chronic illnesses in the last years of his life and often received treatment in France. This ceased to be possible following the outbreak of the coronavirus pandemic in that country. He is buried at Conakry Kipe's cemetery.

== Selected discography ==
=== Albums ===
- Courougnegne (1981)
- N'Diarabi (1982)
- A Paris (1984)
- 10 Cola Nuts (1986)
- Akwaba Beach (1987) (#1 SUI; #13 GER; #43 SWE)
- Touma (1990)
- Nongo Village (1993)
- Tatebola (1996)
- Tamala – Le Voyageur (2001)
- Best Of (2002)
- Sabou (2004)
- La Guinéenne (2012)

=== Compilation appearances ===
- The Rough Guide to Acoustic Africa (2013), World Music Network

=== Singles ===
- "Yé ké yé ké" (1988) (#1 Belgium, Netherlands, Spain, Israel; #2 Germany, Switzerland; #5 France, #10 Austria; #12 Sweden; #29 UK)
- "Tama" (1988) (#44 Germany)
- "Yéké Yéké" (remix) (1995) (#97 Australia, #25 UK)
- "Yéké Yéké" (remix) (1996) (#28 UK)
