= Hadja Nima Bah =

Guinean teacher and politician (born 1927)

- Born: June 13, 1927 or 1937; Kissidougou, Guinea
- Occupations: Writer, activist, Trade unionist, politician

Hadja Nima Bah (born June 13, 1927 or 1937) is a Guinean writer, activist, trade unionist and politician. She was one of the first four Guinean female deputies.

== Biography ==
Hadja Nima Bah was born on June 13, 1927, in Kissidougou, in present-day Forest Guinea. She completed her primary and secondary education in Guinea, obtaining her certificate of study.

She went to Senegal where she attended the École Normale des Jeunes Filles (ENJF) in Rufisque from 1942 to 1945 to become a teacher.

At the age of 19, she worked alongside her father in Faranah in the field of education, then successively in Siguiri, Dinguiraye, Mamou, and later in Conakry, first in Sandervalia and then in Tombo. She also assisted Guinean scholarship students.

After Guinea's independence in 1958, she became one of the first four Guinean female deputies, elected to the territorial assembly of Guinea in 1961 for the Dinguiraye constituency.

In July 1962, she participated in the Conference of African Women (CFA) in Dar es Salaam, Tanzania, advocating for the mobilization of women in the continent's struggle against colonialism.

=== Works ===
- 2014: Mon cahier de Morale, Cours de morale dispensés par Germaine Legoff à l'ENRJF de Rufisque (1944–1945), published by L'Harmattan Guinea.

== See also ==
- Jeanne Martin Cissé
- Fatou Keita
- Fatou Aribot
- Gnalein
