= Penannular =

Penannular means in the form of an incomplete circle or ring and may refer to:

- Penannular brooch or Celtic brooch, a type of brooch clothes fasteners, often rather large
  - Pseudo-penannular brooch, a related type that appears to be penannular, with two large terminals, but actually forms a complete circle
- Penannular ring
- Penannular bracelet
- A common form of earthworks; including some ditches around bowl barrows
