= Hadja Djakagbè Kaba =

Guinean politician

Deputy in the National Assembly (Guinea), 3rd Vice-President of the National Assembly
- President: Alpha Conde
- Preceded by: Hadja Kouraba Sacko
- Constituency: Kankan

Personal details
- Party: Rally of the Guinean People
- Portfolio: President of the Guinean Association for the lightening of female burdens (AGACFEM), President of the Rural Woman's Cooperative for Agriculture, Food Sovereignty and Development (COFRASAD)
- Awards: Women's RIO+20 Good Practice Award:First Prize in the Category Food Sovereignty

Hadja Djakagbè Kaba is a Guinean politician who represents the constituency of Kankan, in the National Assembly (Guinea). She is a member of the Majority Rally of the Guinean People Party of former president Alpha Conde. Elected MP for the Kankan constituency in the National Assembly following the 2020 double ballot, ahead of Bara Sidibé of the MPDG.
