= Miguel Arias Bardou =

Spanish painter

- Born: 1841; Astorga, León, Spain
- Died: 1915 (aged 73–74)
- Known for: Landscape painting, Scenic design
- Notable work: Pueblo Campesino (1891); Bohío y Palma con Riachuelo (1908); Paisaje Cubano (1875)

Miguel Arias Bardou (1841–1915) was a Spanish born Cuban painter. He is best remembered for colorful landscapes such as Pueblo Campesino (1891) and Bohío y Palma con Riachuelo (1908) which mainly depicted harmonious rural themes.

Bardou was born in Astorga, León, Spain in 1841. He moved to Cuba where he worked as a painter and scenographer in Cuban theatres. In 1885 he made a notable display at the La Caridad Theater in Santa Clara, Cuba. He was later employed as a scenographer in the Alhambra Theater in Havana. In 1966, 1971 and 1980 his paintings were exhibited of the National Museum of Fine Arts in Havana. The Museum of Arts and Sciences (Daytona Beach) is today in possession of one of his earlier paintings, Paisaje Cubano (Cuban Landscape), painted in 1875.

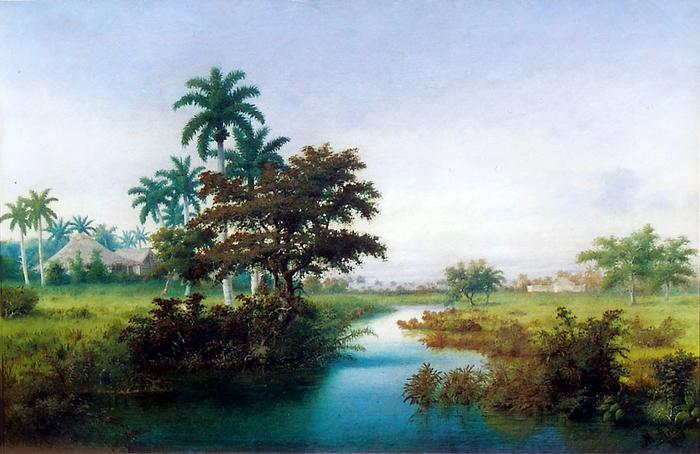

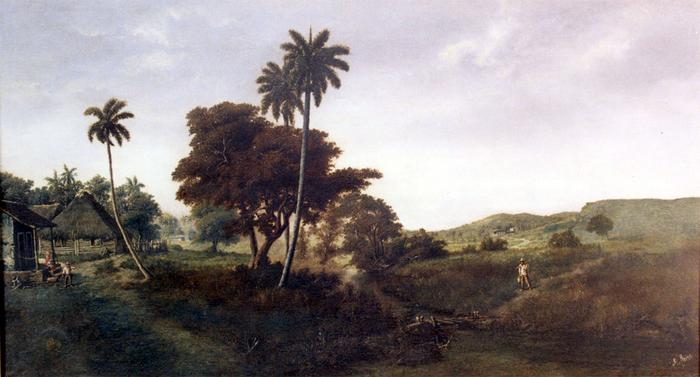

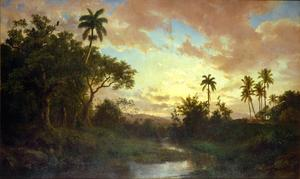
