= Beindou, Faranah =

Beindou
- Sub-prefecture and town
- Location in Guinea
- Coordinates: 10°18′N 10°25′W
- Country: Guinea
- Region: Faranah Region
- Prefecture: Faranah Prefecture

Population
  - Total: 16,521
- Time zone: UTC+0 (GMT)

Beindou is a town and sub-prefecture in the Faranah Prefecture in the Faranah Region of Guinea. As of 2014 it had a population of 16,521 people.
