= Cissé Hadja Mariama Sow =

Guinean politician

Hadja Mariama Sow
- Born: 1942 (age 83–84); Labé Region, Guinea
- Occupation: Politician
- Known for: Member of Guinea's National Assembly
- Children: 8

Cissé Hadja Mariama Sow (born 1942) is a Guinean politician. She was a member of Guinea's National Assembly from 1972 to 1984.

== Biography ==
Sow was born in Labé Region, Guinea. She went to school at Conakry, which is the capital city of Guinea. Her former high school is now called October 2 High School. Guinea became an independent country on September 28, 1958. Sow did not go to university but she became a teacher.

She was a member of Guinea's National Assembly for 12 years, starting in 1972.

When the West African Women’s Associations was formed, she became its first President. For 12 years, she was the Union of Revolutionary Women of Guinea's general secretary.

== Recognitions ==
In 2005, she was one of a thousand women who were nominated for a Nobel Prize. In 2017, she became the President of the Group of Religious Leaders for Health, Development, and Peace in Guinea.

In August 2021, she was listed as one of the seven African women activists who deserve a Wikipedia article by the Global Citizen, an international organisation and advocacy organisation.

== Private life ==
In 1961, she married an engineer. They had eight children and he later served as a governor of Faranah, Forécariat, and Conakry from 1976 to 1984.
