= Katanga Cross =

Historical currency, a copper ingot

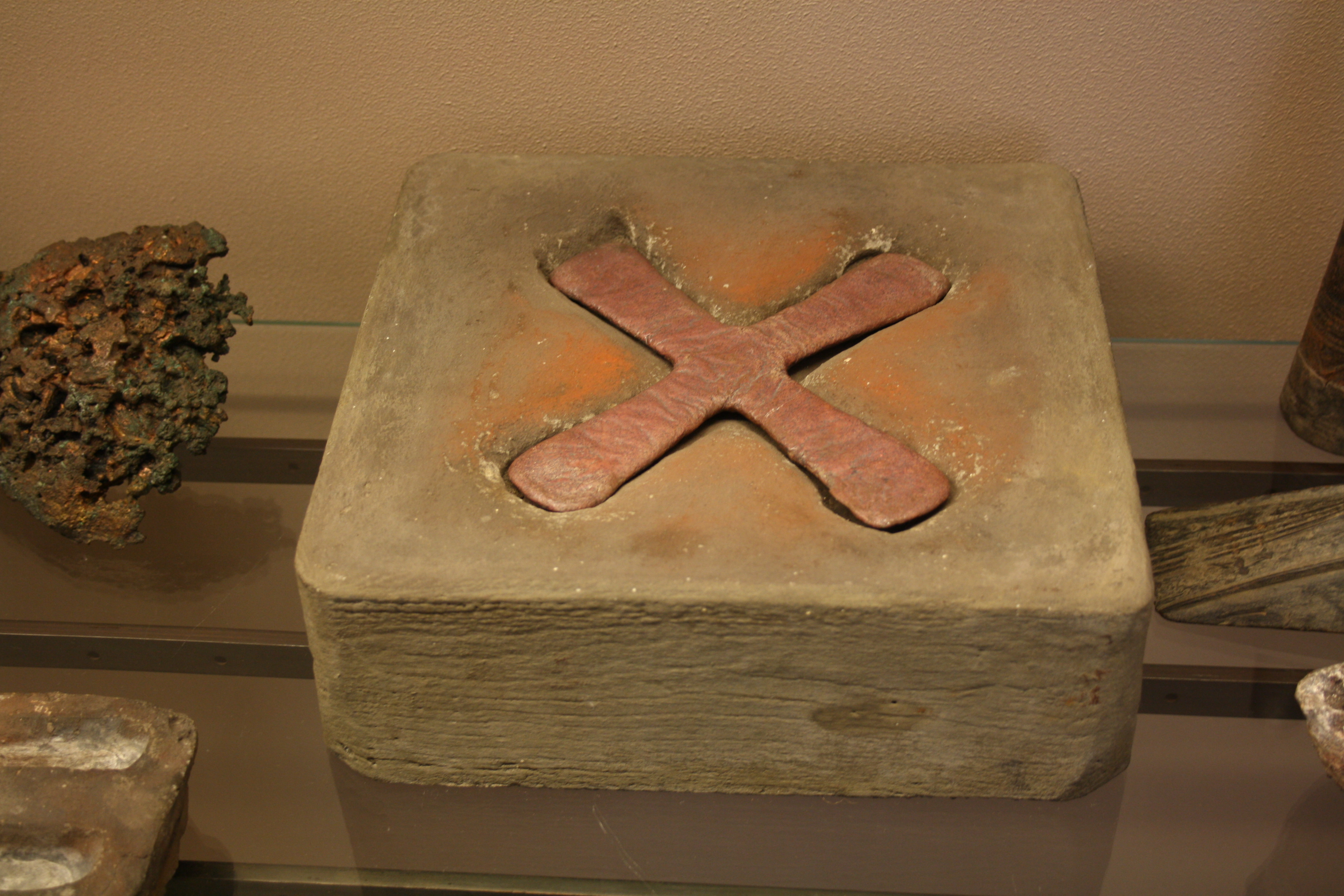
A mould of a Katanga cross.

A Katanga cross (French: croisette du Katanga), also called a handa, is a cast copper ingot in the shape of an equal-armed cross which was once used as a form of currency in parts of what is now the Democratic Republic of the Congo (DRC) in the 19th and early 20th centuries. Katanga crosses were made in various sizes, typically about 20 centimetres (7.9 in) across, and weighing about 1 kilogram (2.2 lb). The name derives from Katanga, a rich copper mining region in the south-eastern portion of the DRC.

These X-shaped ingots were cast by local coppersmiths by pouring molten copper into sand molds.

== Original value ==
During its period of currency, a Katanga cross would buy about 10 kilograms (22 lb) of flour, five or six fowls, or six axes. Ten would buy a gun.

== Modern uses ==
In 1960, Katanga unilaterally seceded from the newly independent Congo-Léopoldville and declared its own independence as the State of Katanga. The Katanga state used the cross as a national symbol; three red katanga crosses appeared in the lower hoist of its flag. Coins issued by Katanga in 1961 also depicted the Katanga Cross. The State of Katanga was forcibly reunited with the Congo in 1963.

Depictions of the Katanga cross
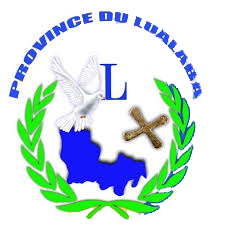
The emblem of Lualaba Province.

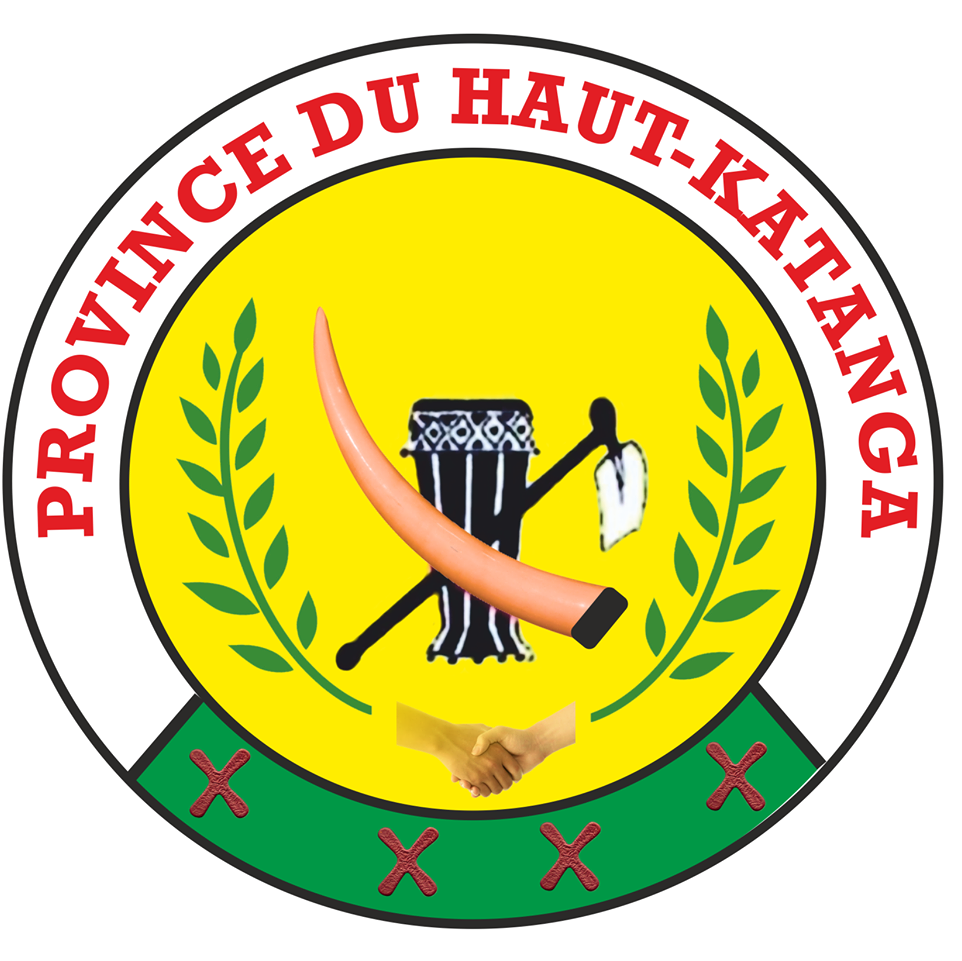
The emblem of Haut-Katanga Province.

The flag of the historical breakaway State of Katanga.

== See also ==
- Manillas
