= Bardou, Hérault =

Village in France

Coordinates: 43°35′41″N 2°56′28″E

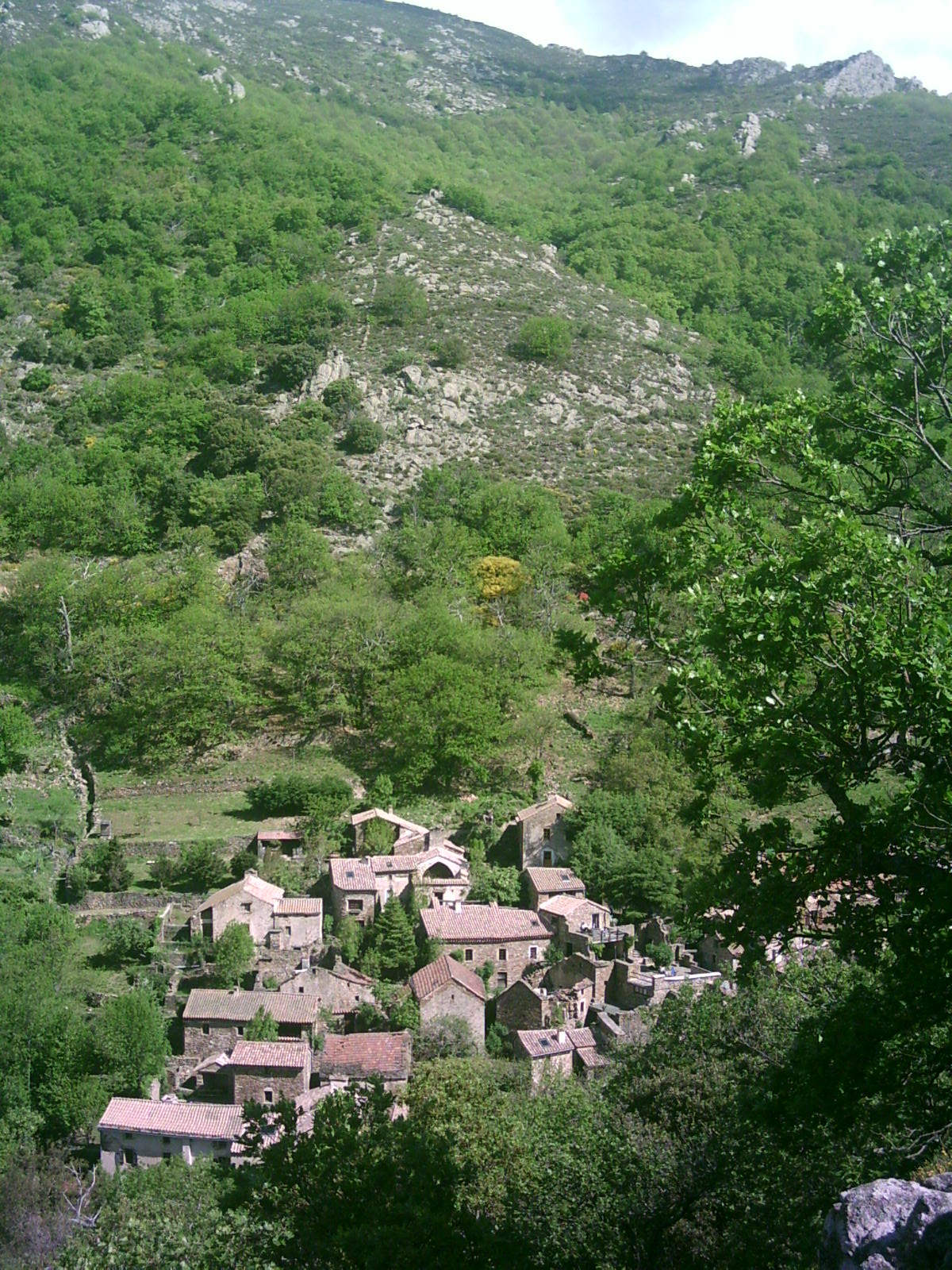
Bardou, 2005

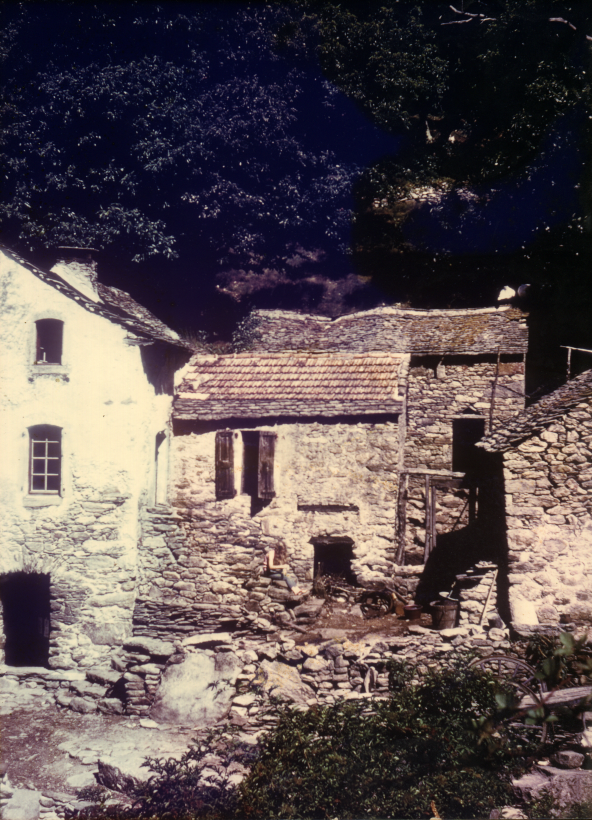
Detail of Bardou, 1973

Bardou, Hérault is a small village located in the Hérault departement in the Languedoc-Roussillon region of France. The hamlet is located in the municipality of Mons, Hérault in the canton Olargues.

== Geography ==
Bardou is situated on the edge of the Massif Central mountain range, part of the Monts de l’Espinouse, in the Natural Regional Park of Upper Languedoc. The nearest town in the east is Bédarieux (28 km; 17 mi), in the south is Béziers (39 km; 24 mi) and in the west is Saint-Pons-de-Thomières (33 km; 21 mi).

== History ==
=== Middle ages ===
There are no historic records of the foundation of the hamlet. The oldest houses still existing were probably built in the 15th century.

=== 17th to 19th century ===
The oldest records originate from a population census in 1785. By that time 79 persons were living in 14 households in the village. In the following century the population changed only slightly, reaching its peak in 1865 when 89 persons lived in Bardou. In 1901 a school was opened where 15 children were instructed some of whom came from the neighbouring village of Héric or the nearby farm of Le Sécadou.

=== 20th century ===
The First World War changed the population structure substantially. The men went to the front and the women were not able to maintain the agriculture. After 1918 the returning veterans found poor living conditions, the village was haunted by famine and disease. Young people, in particular, left Bardou to seek work and better living conditions in larger villages and towns. When the dirt road to the Valley of Le Pradal was built in 1924 the majority of the population of Bardou used it to leave the village. By 1925 there were only six households left in Bardou. By 1967 only a single man was left, Achille Bonnét.

In 1967, however, the German, Klaus Erhardt, and the American, Jean Rauch, purchased most of the dilapidated hamlet and set about the task of reviving it.

=== Klaus and Jean ===
The couple Klaus Erhardt, (born 17 September 1934 in Hannover, died 20 July 2009 in Bardou) and Jean Rauch (born 21 December 1930, died 9 February 2016 in Bardou) had spent several years traveling before they decided, in 1966, to settle down with Jean's four children (William, James, Elizabeth and Pan) in the South of France. They first lived in a big house in Le Lau: a hamlet in the community of Vieussan. Later they learned about an almost abandoned village above Mons-la-Trivalle — Bardou. They quickly made the decision to move from Le Lau to this place.

Bardou at that time consisted of some 20 ramshackle houses which were mainly overgrown by trees, shrubbery and ivy. Achille Bonnet, the then last resident of the hamlet owned 40% of the area the other 60% were distributed across more than 100 partial owners. These owners were eager to sell their property, unable to imagine living in Bardou themselves. Due to the large number of owners the negotiations were protracted over several months. By the beginning of 1968, Klaus Erhardt owned most of the buildings in Bardou as well as 110 acres (45 ha) of the surrounding land. An additional 190 acres (77 ha) were “Mazade”— common land that was cultivated collaboratively by all inhabitants.

Over the next few years, the new owners excavated and restored the buildings and roads of Bardou. After the first few houses were inhabitable, guests began to arrive and spent their holidays there. Many passing travelers who took a liking to dropout life and hands-on work joined in. Some of them stayed for weeks, others for months to help rebuild the village piece by piece, and the restored houses were rented out. Friends of the family also came regularly to Bardou and stayed for extended periods to help with the project. Some of the houses were named after those who assisted in the rebuild.

Initially, there were no sewage systems, water lines, telephone lines or electricity. The access road was no more than a dirt track which had to be cleared of scrub and stone. By 1969, more than half of the road was paved, but the last 1.4 km (0.87 mi) remained in poor condition until the end of the 1980s. It was not until 1994 that Bardou was connected to the French electricity grid. A telephone connection has been available since the late 1970s. However, the village still has no water supply. Drinking water is collected from natural springs in the vicinity. The waste water is collected over the year, fermented and dispersed via a sewage irrigation field. Some of the houses still do not have power and water to date. There are several outhouses on the outskirts of the village and in the centre of the village, there is now a bath house with two showers and water toilets for guests.

Klaus Erhardt died on 20 July 2009 in Bardou. Jean Erhardt and her daughter, Elizabeth Erhardt-Nolan continue to reside in Bardou. In 2010, great change came to Bardou. By modernizing the tapping of the spring water and building three new drinking water reservoirs, the yearly problem of dwindling drinking water reserves in the summer has been alleviated. Furthermore, many houses have been significantly modernized and enhanced with cast-iron fireplaces and all the comforts of life. An unnamed building was also completed next to the concert hall.

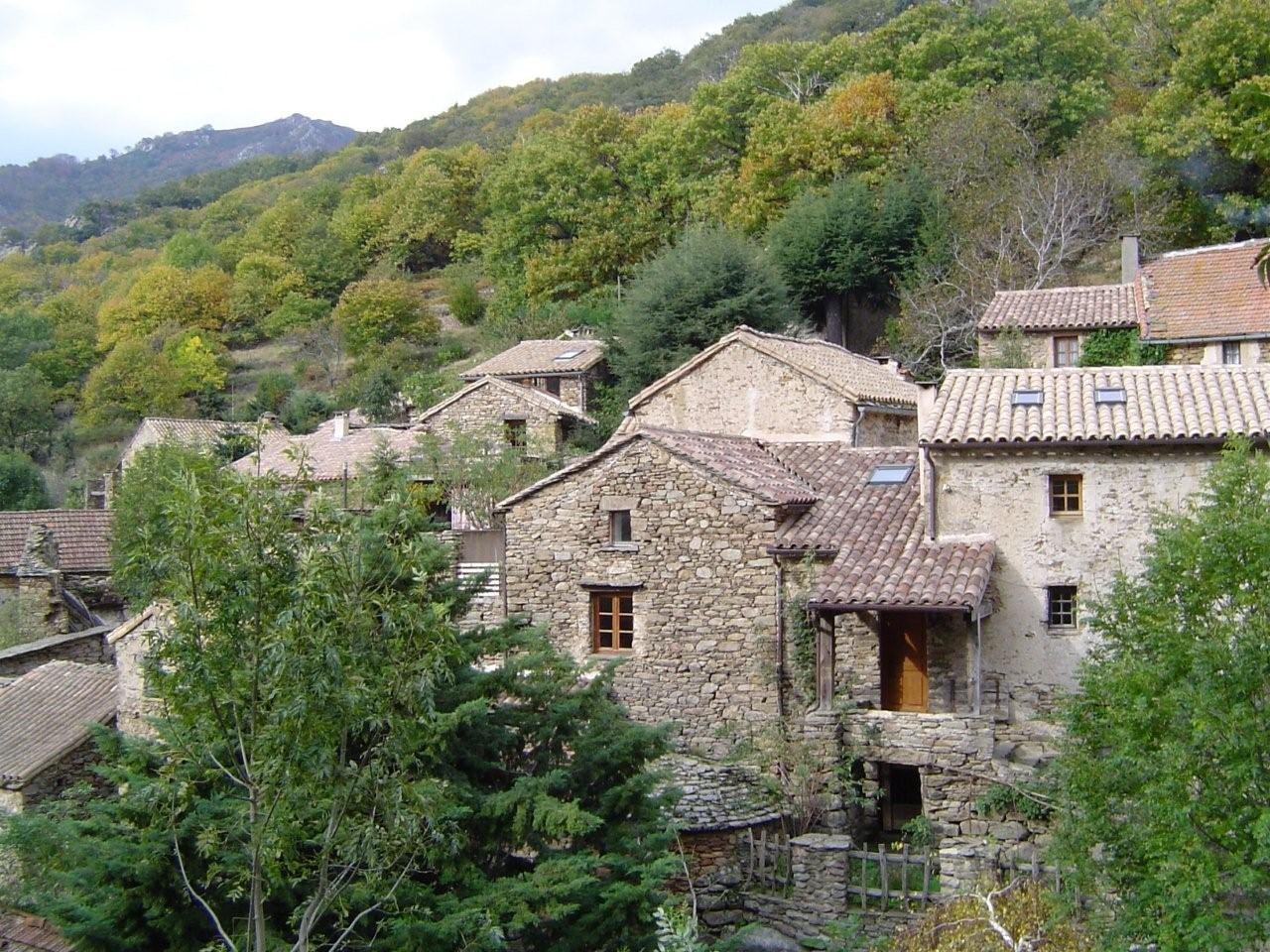
Bardou, 2008

=== Bardou today ===
Bardou has become a popular holiday destination. In the three summer months many guests spend their holidays here. Each cottage in the village is unique, clustered together against a backdrop of chestnut trees and strutting peacocks.

Bardou has also become a place of music. The Sinfonietta (orchestra), Camerata and Chamber Orchestra are collections of young musicians who congregate here every year from all over the world to rehearse their music together. Their performances take place at the end of the season in the nearby churches, monasteries, and castles.

== Economy ==
Jane Jacobs cited Bardou as "a microcosmic example of a passive economy, meaning an economy that is shaped and reshaped by forces that do not originate within itself but come from outside, specifically from distant cities. Like a toy on a string, time and again Bardou has been jerked by this powerful external economic energy."
