= Faranah Region =

Region of Guinea

Coordinates: 10°00′N 10°50′W

Faranah
- Region
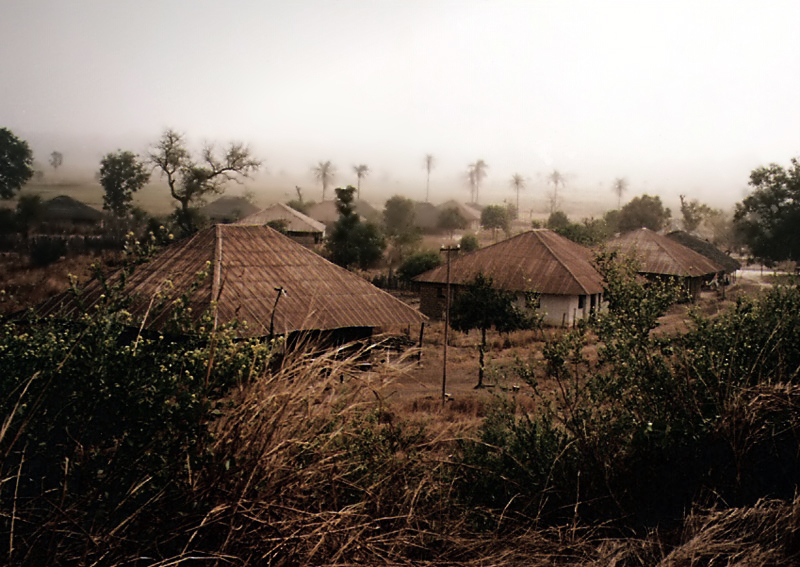

- Faranah Region in Guinea
- Country: Guinea
- Capital: Faranah

Government
  - Governor: Malick Diakité

Area
  - Total: 35,581 km^{2} (13,738 sq mi)

Population (2025 census)
  - Total: 1,460,931
  - Density: 41.059/km^{2} (106.34/sq mi)
- HDI (2023): 0.435 low · 6th of 8

Faranah Region (N'Ko: ߝߙߊߣߊ߫ ߕߌ߲߬ߞߎߘߎ߲) is located in east-central Guinea. It is bordered by the countries of Sierra Leone and Mali and the Guinean regions of Kankan, Mamou, Nzérékoré, and Labé.

== Administrative divisions ==
Faranah Region is divided into four prefectures; which are further sub-divided into 42 sub-prefectures:

- Dabola Prefecture (9 sub-prefectures)
- Dinguiraye Prefecture (8 sub-prefectures)
- Faranah Prefecture (12 sub-prefectures)
- Kissidougou Prefecture (13 sub-prefectures)

== Geography ==
Faranah Region is traversed by the northwesterly line of equal latitude and longitude.
