= August 1977 =

Month in 1977

<<	August 1977					>>
Su	Mo	Tu	We	Th	Fr	Sa
	1	2	3	4	5	6
7	8	9	10	11	12	13
14	15	16	17	18	19	20
21	22	23	24	25	26	27
28	29	30	31

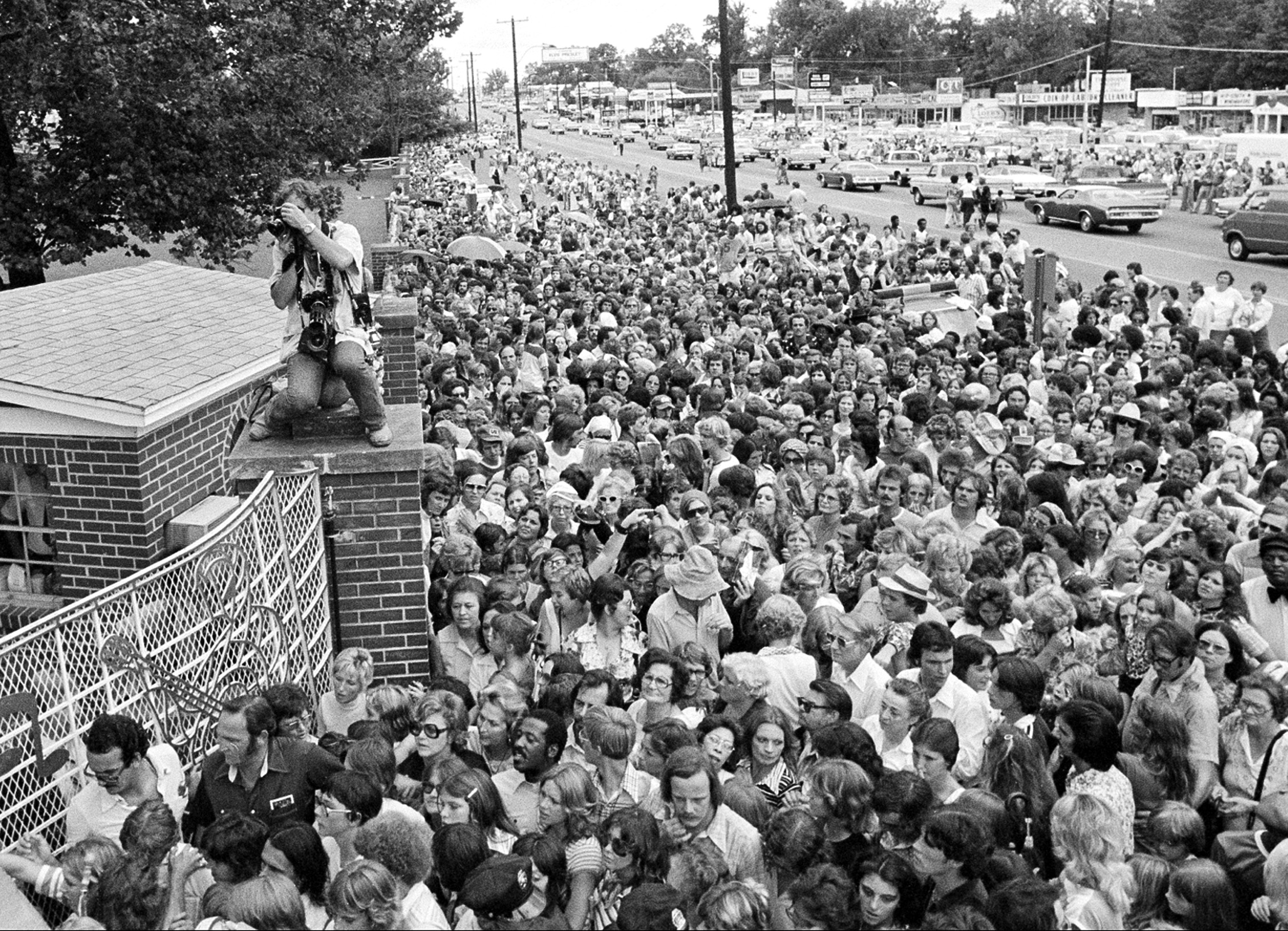
August 16, 1977: Iconic singer Elvis Presley passes away a day before his scheduled concert tour.

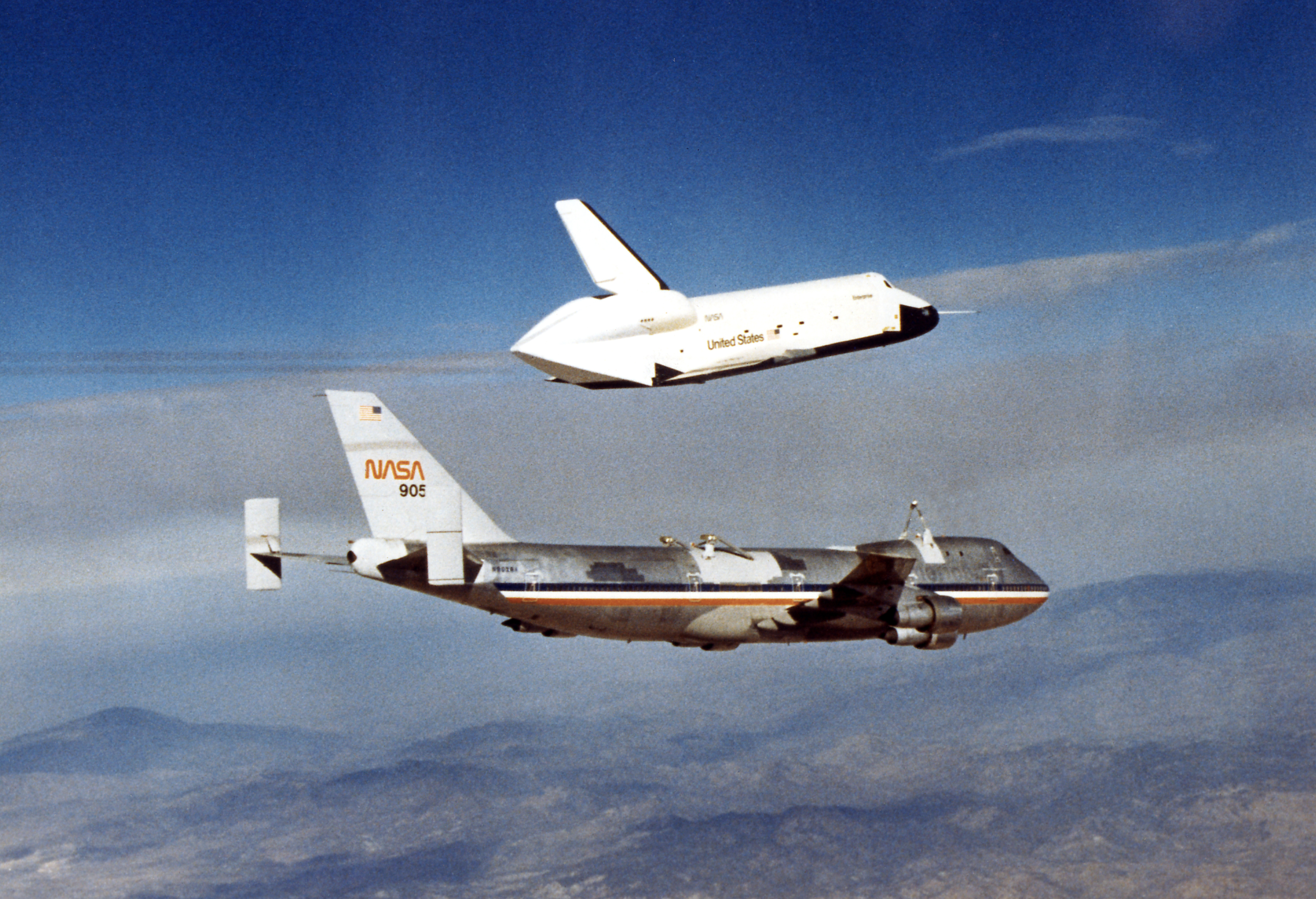
August 12, 1977: U.S. space shuttle Enterprise, the first spacecraft designed to land like an airplane, separates from carrier and glides to its touchdown

The following events occurred in August 1977:

== August 1, 1977 (Monday) ==
- The Jiu Valley miners' strike, the largest protest movement in Romania up to that time against the Communist regime of Nicolae Ceaușescu, began near Lupeni as 35,000 of the 90,000 coal miners in the area walked off of the job because of poor working conditions and compensation. Soon, other miners in Transylvania's Jiu Valley followed suit, causing an economic crisis.
- The government of Turkey's Prime Minister Suleyman Demirel won a vote of confidence in the Grand National Assembly, 229 to 219 in his favor.
- The University of the District of Columbia was created from the merger of three historically black colleges, District of Columbia Teachers College, Federal City College, and Washington Technical Institute.
- The first oil from the Trans-Alaska Pipeline System was shipped with the departure of the Arco Juneau, a tanker carrying 800,000 barrels of oil, from Valdez.
- North Korea announced its establishment of a "military sea boundary", unprecedented in international law, that extended 50 miles (80 km) from the North Korean coast into the Sea of Japan and into the Yellow Sea separating North Korea from China. The United Nations Command nations, including South Korea and the U.S., refused to recognize the claim, which went beyond the 12 miles (19 km) limit for territorial waters.
- Born: Haspop (stage name for Hassan El Hajjami), French dancer and choreographer; in Lyon
- Died:
  - Francis Gary Powers, 47, American CIA pilot best known for being shot down over the Soviet Union in the U-2 incident, was killed in the crash of a news helicopter he was operating for the KNBC TV station in Los Angeles, along with the KNBC cameraman, George Spears. Powers and Spears had departed from Burbank, California in a Bell 206B JetRanger helicopter to provide aerial coverage of a wildfire in Santa Barbara County, and Powers underestimated the amount of fuel on the flight back. The main rotor halted as the helicopter was 50 feet (15 m) above a field in Encino where Powers was attempting an autorotation to an open field, killing both men.
  - Sita Valles, 25, political activist and doctor, was executed by a firing squad at the prison of the Angola Information and Security Directorate, after she was tortured and raped.

== August 2, 1977 (Tuesday) ==
- U.S. President Jimmy Carter transmitted a statement, "Drug Abuse Message to Congress", endorsing the decriminalization of marijuana, by reducing the federal penalty for possession from a felony to a misdemeanor, and to eliminate any penalty at all for possession of an ounce or less of the drug. "Penalties against possession of a drug should not be more damaging to an individual than the use of the drug itself," Carter stated, "and where they are, they should be changed."
- Two days of voting concluded in Syria for all 195 seats in the People's Council (Majlis al-Sha'b). The ruling Ba'ath Party won 125 seats for a large majority, and four other parties affiliated with the Ba'ath Party won 24 races, and independent candidates had 46. Voting had extended by a day because an insufficient number of ballots had been cast on August 1.
- Born: Edward Furlong, American film actor; in Glendale, California
- Died: Cardinal Manuel Gonçalves Cerejeira, 88, Roman Catholic Patriarch of Lisbon and the oldest member of the College of Cardinals

== August 3, 1977 (Wednesday) ==
- Romania's dictator, Nicolae Ceaușescu, was booed by many people in a crowd of at least 35,000 people while giving a speech at Lupeni, site of the largest labor strike in a Communist nation's history. The strikeleader, Costică Dobre, presented Ceaușescu with a list of 26 demands on behalf of the miners. Ceaușescu delivered a speech where he promised to implement reforms, then returned to Bucharest to make plans to punish the people who walked out on strike. Dobre and other strike organizers were deported to other parts of the country and assigned new work, while thousands of other identified strikers were relocated to other jobs.
- U.S. President Carter signed the Surface Mining Control and Reclamation Act of 1977, requiring mining companies to restore the condition of land where strip mining had been used to reach the minerals on and beneath the property. The new law required that companies file a reclamation bond to ensure that the reclaiming (including the planting of grass and trees) would take place when the property was no longer being mined.
- In the U.S., the Tandy Corporation, owner of the Radio Shack chain of electronics stores, introduced the first mass-produced microcomputer, TRS-80. The model was unveiled and demonstrated at a press conference at the Warwick Hotel in New York City.
- The Soviet Union launched Kosmos 936, the fourth of the Bion series of satellites for biological experiments in weightlessness. The satellite carried experiments from nine nations (including the U.S. and France, as well as six of the Communist nations, and returned to Earth on August 22.
- The United States Senate began hearings on the MK-ULTRA experiments conducted between 1953 and 1964 by the Central Intelligence Agency (CIA). The U.S. spy agency had turned over evidence of 149 different projects that had enlisted researchers at 80 different institutions, and human test subjects, none of whom were aware that they were gathering data on "mind control", the regulation of human behavior with chemical substances.
- Born:
  - Tom Brady, American NFL quarterback, three time NFL Most Valuable Player, 7-time Super Bowl champion; in San Mateo, California
  - Deniz Akkaya, Turkish fashion model and actress; in Istanbul
- Died:
  - Makarios III, 63, President of Cyprus since 1960 to 1974 as well as the Greek Orthodox Archbishop of Cyprus. Spyros Kyprianou, leader of the Cyprus House of Representatives, became the acting president, with recognition on the Greek Cypriot sector on the southern part of the island, and full president when no candidate announced a plan to oppose him in the September 10 election. Makarios was succeeded as archbishop by Christoforos Aristodimou, bishop of Paphos, who took the name Chrysostomos I.
  - Alfred Lunt, 84, American stage actor and film director known for his partnership with his wife Lynn Fontanne

== August 4, 1977 (Thursday) ==

- The United States Department of Energy was created as U.S. President Carter signed legislation into law. Former U.S. Defense Secretary James R. Schlesinger was sworn into office the next day as the first U.S. Secretary of Energy, and the DOE began operations on October 1.
- An underground mine explosion in Mozambique at Moatize killed 150 miners of coking coal. The blast occurred at the Moazambique Coal Mining Company's Chipanga No. 3 mine. In September, 1976, a previous explosion at the company's Moatize mines had killed 95 employees. Angry at the lack of safe working conditions, a group of employees killed nine foreign mining engineers who had been hired from Portugal and Belgium.
- The eviction of the remaining 55 tenants of San Francisco's International Hotel was carried out by 400 of the city's riot police, seven months after a court order directing the residential hotel's mostly Filipino American population to leave. In January, 3,000 protesters, led by Jim Jones of the Peoples Temple cult, had surrounded the hotel and the San Francisco Sheriff had refused to carry out the order. Jones would later relocate to Guyana, where his followers would meet a tragic end in 1978. The hotel building would finally be demolished in 1981.
- Died:
  - Edgar Adrian, 87, English electrophysiologist and 1932 Nobel Prize winner
  - Ernst Bloch, 92, German philosopher

== August 5, 1977 (Friday) ==
- New York became the first U.S. state to enact a "Plain English law", requiring all consumer loan agreements to be written in a form that used fewer words, avoided small print, formatted with shorter paragraphs, and that placed bold print for emphasis on the most important requirements. The legal requirements were based on a revised loan agreement form that had been adopted earlier in the year by Citibank, and soon adopted by other lending institutions as well.
- The Youth Employment and Demonstration Projects Act (YEDPA) was signed into law by U.S. President Carter, amending the 1973 Comprehensive Employment and Training Act (CETA) to provide programs for employment and job training of people in their late teens and early 20s.
- Born: David Chang (Chang Seok-ho), Korean-American restaurateur, founder of the Momofuku restaurant chain; in Arlington, Virginia

== August 6, 1977 (Saturday) ==
- In Rhodesia, a bomb went off inside a Woolworths department store in Salisbury (now Harare in Zimbabwe), killing 11 civilians and injuring 76 others.
- Born: Marílson Gomes dos Santos, Brazilian long-distance runner and twice winner of the New York City Marathon; in Brasília
- Died: Alexander Bustamante, 93, the first Prime Minister of Jamaica, who served from 1962 to 1967

== August 7, 1977 (Sunday) ==
- An All Nippon Airways jetliner with 317 people on board was struck by debris from a volcano as it flew at high altitude over the Japanese island of Hokkaido. The Lockheed TriStar airliner was on its way from Sapporo to Nagoya when it was caught in the sudden eruption of the Mount Usu volcano, which sent a column of smoke 39,360 feet (12,000 m) high into the atmosphere, and two of the cockpit's windows were cracked.
- Amir-Abbas Hoveyda, Prime Minister of Iran for more than 12 years, resigned along with his cabinet. Hoveyda was replaced by Interior Minister Jamshid Amouzegar, would serve as Premier for a little more than a year before leaving Iran permanently. Hoveyda would decline to leave Iran before the Iranian Revolution, and would be executed by a firing squad on April 7, 1979, less than two years after he had last served as the premier.

== August 8, 1977 (Monday) ==
- Communist China's Vice Premier Deng Xiaoping delivered the speech "Some Comments on Work in Science and Education" to delegates to a national meeting of scientists and government officials in Beijing, announcing an end to the campaign against intellectuals that had been part of the Cultural Revolution since 1966. Deng noted that the development of China's productive forces depended on developing science and technology, and that the development had not been going well. Deng proposed that the Chinese Science and Technology Commission should be re-established, along with college entrance examinations to select the most qualified entrants into the nation's universities. An author would note later that "The decision changed the fate of a generation of students, and provided the basis of human resources for internally-sourced technology progress and science development."
- The Salyut 5 space station, the last to be put into orbit for espionage and surveillance purposes, was de-orbited after 13 months of service, and five months after its last use by a crew. By 1977, reconnaissance satellites (a technology used by the U.S. since 1969) had been perfected to the point that the same data could be collected without the use of a space station crew.
- On the recommendation of his Secretary of State, Cyrus Vance, based on representations by the government of Saudi Arabia, U.S. President Carter announced that if the Palestine Liberation Organization (PLO) accepted United Nations Security Council Resolution 242— the 1967 peace proposal by which Egypt, Syria, Jordan and Israel would acknowledge "the sovereignty, territorial integrity and political independence of every State in the area and their right to live in peace within secure and recognized boundaries"— then the United States would open a dialogue with the PLO as representatives of the Palestinian people in the Middle East. The PLO's council, however, rejected the offer on August 28.
- Near the town of Sequim, Washington, farmer Manny Manis discovered the tusks of a mastodon and its skeleton while excavating a pond. Carbon-14 dating indicated that the skeleton was 13,800 years old; inspection of the skeleton would also show that part of a spearhead was embedded in the animal's ribs, the earliest evidence of humans in North America.
- Died:
  - Son Ngoc Thanh, Cambodian politician who had served as Prime Minister of the Khmer Republic from March to October, 1972, and of the Kingdom of Cambodia from August to October, 1945; died in a Vietnamese prison, two years after having been arrested following the Fall of Saigon.
  - Eduard Roschmann, 68, Austrian Nazi war criminal known as "The Butcher of Riga" for overseeing the liquidation of Latvia's Jewish Riga Ghetto in 1943, and who fled to South America, died in Paraguay after fleeing West German investigators who had located his home in Argentina.

== August 9, 1977 (Tuesday) ==
- The military-controlled government of Uruguay announced that it would hold general elections in 1981 for a return to civilian rule, with an elected President and the bicameral General Assembly of Uruguay.
- Born: Chamique Holdsclaw, American pro basketball player, WNBA scoring champion, 2002, for the Washington Mystics; in Queens, New York
- Died: Czeslaw Znamierowski, 87, Soviet Lithuanian artist

== August 10, 1977 (Wednesday) ==
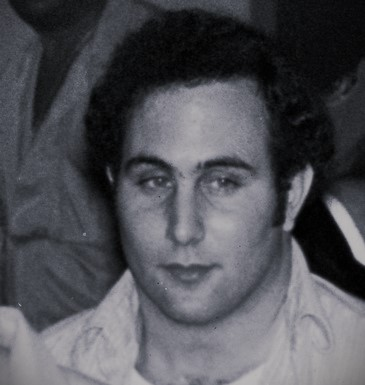
David Berkowitz, the "Son of Sam" shortly after being arrested

- Serial killer David Berkowitz, who called himself "Son of Sam" and had terrorized New York City for more than a year, was arrested as he exited his apartment building in Yonkers, New York. His words to the police were, "Well, you got me." In a search of Berkowitz's car, police found a .45-caliber Thompson submachine gun, 180 rounds of ammunition, and a letter suggesting that he had plans to use the weapon to attack people in one of the discotheques in the Hamptons in Long Island.
- Negotiators for the United States and Panama reached an agreement on the terms of a written treaty to transfer ownership of the Panama Canal from the U.S. to the Panamanian government.
- The Jakarta Stock Exchange (JSX), dormant since 1956, was revived by the government of Indonesia as President Suharto opened the first day of trading. In 2007, it would merge with the Surabaya Stock Exchange to form the Indonesia Stock Exchange.
- Queen Elizabeth II of the United Kingdom of Great Britain and Northern Ireland began a two-day tour of Northern Ireland with tight security from 32,000 soldiers, militia and police to protect her and her family. The Queen, along with her husband Prince Philip, and her two younger children, Prince Andrew and Prince Edward, arrived on the yacht Britannia at the Belfast harbour, then transferred to the escort frigate HMS Fife. From there, she made her first ever flight on a helicopter and landed at Hillsborough Castle, where she conferred knighthood upon the Lord Mayor of Belfast, Myles Humphreys, in the first knighting investiture ceremony ever telecast on live television.
- NFL players Randy Crowder and Don Reese, both of the Miami Dolphins, began prison sentences at the Dade County Stockade in Miami after pleading guilty to drug trafficking. Both would miss the entire 1977 NFL season and return to play— for other teams— in 1978.
- U.S. wrestler Terry Gene Bollea began his professional wrestling career, making his debut for Championship Wrestling from Florida (CWF) as "The Super Destroyer" in a match against Brian Blair in Fort Myers, Florida. On November 17, 1979, he would first wrestle under the name "Hulk Hogan".
- Died:
  - Grete L. Bibring, 78, Austrian-born American psychoanalyst and the first full professor at Harvard Medical School
  - Shyamlal Gupta, 80, popular Indian poet who wrote under the pen name Parshad

== August 11, 1977 (Thursday) ==
- A general labor strike shut down all service on the island of Aruba, a popular Caribbean tourist destination. Police arrested union leaders a week later and ended the strike on August 18.
- Died: John Howard Lawson, 82, American playwright, screenwriter and author who had been one of the "Hollywood Ten" jailed in 1950 for contempt of Congress after refusing to cooperate with the House Un-American Activities Committee.

== August 12, 1977 (Friday) ==
- The first NASA Space Shuttle, named Enterprise, made its first test free-flight starting at 8:48 in the morning after separating from riding piggyback on a Boeing 747 at an altitude of 27,000 feet (8,200 m) over the Mojave Desert in California. Astronauts Fred Haise (a veteran of the Apollo 13 mission) and Gordon Fullerton then guided the shuttle to a landing at Edwards Air Force Base. The flight was the 12th of 16 Approach and Landing Tests and the first of the five free flight tests.
- In Sri Lanka, nine days of rioting began that would end after the deaths of 125 people, most of them members of the Tamil minority, at the hands of the larger Sinhalese majority. The triggering event took place in the city of Jaffna, capital of the predominantly Tamil Northern Province of the island nation when a group of Sinhalese policemen shot four Tamils at a carnival.
- The High Energy Astronomy Observatory 1 x-ray telescope was launched into orbit by the U.S. from Cape Canaveral. It would send data for 17 months until January 9, 1979, and re-enter the Earth's atmosphere on March 15 of that year.
- In Chile, the Central Nacional de Informaciones (CNI) or "National Center of Information") was created, replacing Chile's secret police, the DINA (Dirección de Inteligencia Nacional or National Directorate of Intelligence). The government announced that DINA had been dissolved because it had "completed the delicate national security functions with which it was entrusted" in arresting dissidents, many of whom were never seen in public again, after the 1973 coup. Using the same personnel as the DINA, the CNI perfected the tortures used on opponents of the government of Augusto Pinochet.
- A review panel of the U.S. Army upheld the conviction for desertion (and the subsequent execution by firing squad on January 31, 1945) of Private Eddie Slovik and ruled that his widow was not entitled to government life insurance benefits. A statement from the office of the U.S. Secretary of the Army said that "The record clearly reflects that Pvt. Slovik deserted to avoid combat duty. The law covering the payment of National Service Life Insurance benefits precludes payment in the case of individuals who are convicted of desertion." While Slovik had not been the only person to flee from military service during World War II, he was the only one to receive the death penalty.
- The hijacking of an Air France airliner ended abruptly when the lone hijacker, 19-year-old Egyptian student Tarek el Khater, stepped off of the Airbus A-300 to check on refueling. Khater had seized the flight after it had departed from Paris with 242 people on board, en route to Cairo. After being denied permission to land in Benghazi or Athens with fuel running low, the Airbus landed in Italy at Brindisi. When Khater left the plane, the Air France crew slammed the door behind him and police closed in to arrest him.
- Born:
  - Iva Majoli, Croatian tennis player, 1997 winner of the women's singles of the French Open; in Zagreb, SR Croatia, Yugoslavia
  - Jesper Gronkjaer, Greenland-born Danish footballer, winger with 80 caps for the Denmark national team; in Godthåb (now Nuuk)
- Died:
  - Royal Navy Rear-Admiral Hubert Edward Dannreuther, 96, British naval officer and one of only six people (out of a crew of 1,021) who survived the 1916 sinking of HMS Invincible (1907) during the Battle of Jutland.
  - Ely Palmer, 89, American diplomat and the first U.S. ambassador to Afghanistan.

== August 13, 1977 (Saturday) ==
- Violent clashes took place in the London borough of Lewisham between 500 marchers from the far-right National Front, and members of and thousands of sympathizers with Britain's Socialist Workers Party. In the melee that followed, "the Battle of Lewisham", 56 London police were injured and 214 people were arrested.
- Zaire's Foreign Minister, Nguza Karl-I-Bond, was arrested on orders of President Mobutu Sese Seko and charged with treason. President Mobutu charged Nguza, a native of Zaire's Shaba province, of having been aware that Katangan rebels would stage the invasion that had taken place in March and failing to warn him. After torture failed to find sufficient evidence to back the charges, Mobutu would pardon Nguza in 1979 and return him to the post of Foreign Minister.
- A freak accident fatally injured Officer George W. Redding of the California Highway Patrol and injured two bystanders. Officer Redding was investigating an accident where a motorist had run off of the road south of Redding, California and struck a telephone pole, causing it to tilt. The pole was held up by guy-wires, "stretched taut as piano string" and stretching across the four lanes of California Road 273, and while Redding was making his report, the wires were "strained past the breaking point" and snapped, whipped around, broke both of Redding's legs and flipped him violently to the pavement, where he sustained the fatal concussion. Redding, 43, died four days later on August 17, without having regained consciousness.
- Born: Michael Klim, Polish-born Australian swimmer, winner of two Olympic gold medals in the 2000 Summer Games and winner of three world championships; in Gdynia
- Died:
  - Henry Williamson, 81, English novelist
  - Marie-Hélène Cardot, 78, French resistance leader during World War II

== August 14, 1977 (Sunday) ==
- Sadiq al-Mahdi, a former Prime Minister of Sudan who had been convicted of treason and sentenced to death in absentia for his role in an attempted coup d'etat against President Jaafar Nimeiry, was pardoned by Numeiry and allowed to return home from exile.
- Masood Mahmood, the former director of Pakistan's Federal Investigation Agency, sent a letter to the nation's leader, General Zia ul-Haq, offering to disclose "the misdeeds of the federal security force directed by me under Zulfiqar Ali Bhutto's orders," and soon became the chief prosecution witness against Bhutto, the nation's recently-deposed Prime Minister. On October 18, Mahmood would tell a military court that Bhutto had directed him to have the FIA assassinate Ahmad Raza Khan Kasuri, a political opponent. In 1974, FIA agents mistakenly killed Raza Khan Kasuri's father, Nawab Muhammad Ahmed Khan Kasuri and, Mahmood testified, Bhutto was "most peeved, most agitated, and said that the actual task had yet to be accomplished." Bhutto would soon be jailed for murder and executed in 1979.
- Lanny Wadkins won the PGA Championship in the first sudden death playoff in a major golf title game. Wadkins defeated Gene Littler, who had held the lead from the first day and had been five strokes ahead of the other golfers after nine holes in the final round.
- The largest crowd to witness a soccer football game in the United States up to that time— 77,691 people— turned out at Giants Stadium in East Rutherford, New Jersey to see the New York Cosmos defeat the Fort Lauderdale Strikers, 8 to 3, in the North American Soccer League playoffs.
- Born: Juan Pierre, American baseball player; in Mobile, Alabama
- Died:
  - Bobby Isaac, 45, American stock car racing driver and 1970 NASCAR Cup Series champion, died one day after suffering a heart attack while competing at the Hickory Motor Speedway in North Carolina. Isaac had been in fourth place when he pulled into pit row and collapsed from heat exhaustion.
  - Ron Haydock, 37, American actor and rock and roll singer, was killed after being hit by a truck while hitchhiking near Victorville, California.

== August 15, 1977 (Monday) ==
- The "Wow! signal", which appeared to be a signal transmitted by intelligent life from deep space, was picked up by "The Big Ear", a radio telescope operated by Ohio State University. Ohio State's participation was part of the SETI (Search for Extraterrestrial Intelligence) project. The name of the signal was inspired by a handwritten comment on the computer, made by Jerry Ehman, a volunteer on the project.
- Herbert Kappler, a German Nazi war criminal incarcerated since 1945 for ordering the Ardeatine massacre, on March 23, 1944, of 335 civilians in Italy as director of the Sicherheitspolizei, escaped from the Caelian Hill military hospital in Rome. Kappler's wife Anneliese, who was also his nurse, had entered the prison hospital with a large suitcase and Kappler climbed inside. Several police, unaware that the suitcase held Kappler rather than medical equipment, did not search the baggage and even helped Mrs. Kappler in carrying the suitcase to a waiting vehicle. Returning to a home in Soltau in West Germany, Kappler would die of cancer less than six months later.
- Reba McEntire, a 22-year-old education major and graduate of Southeastern Oklahoma State University, began her major recording career with the release by Mercury Records of her self-titled debut studio album. She had previously had three 45 rpm recordings, starting with "I Don't Want to Be a One Night Stand".
- Born:
  - Igor Cassina, Italian gymnast and 2004 Olympic gold medalist; in Seregno
  - Nana Ama McBrown, Ghanaian TV and film actress; in Kumasi
- Died:
  - Johnnie Spence, 41, British musical director and arranger, died of a heart attack at home.
  - Lou Walters (originally Louis Abraham Warmwater), 83, British-born American theatrical producer and father of Barbara Walters

== August 16, 1977 (Tuesday) ==
- At the age of 42, popular American singer Elvis Presley died of a heart attack the day before he was planning to begin his August tour of eight cities. Presley, who had toured earlier in the summer, had been scheduled to start with an August 17 concert at the Cumberland County Civic Center in Portland, Maine. In the afternoon, hours before Presley was scheduled to fly from Memphis, his girlfriend Ginger Alden found him collapsed on the bathroom floor. He was pronounced dead at 3:30.
- Judge Alfred M. Ascione of the U.S. state of New York ruled in favor of Renee Richards in her suit against the United States Tennis Association (ASTA) and allowed her to compete in the U.S. Open. Richards, an ophthalmologist who had formerly been Richard Raskind, underwent gender-affirming surgery in 1975 while transitioning from a man to a woman. After being cleared to compete at the U.S. Open, Richards was defeated in the first round in the singles tournament by Wimbledon champion Virginia Wade. She and a partner reached the finals in women's doubles competition.
- Three brothers in Australia— Andrew, Jon and Tim Farriss— formed a rock group along with friends Garry Gary Beers, Michael Hutchence, and Kirk Pengilly, and called themselves "The Farriss Brothers". In 1979, the band's name would be changed to INXS and go on to sell 70 million albums worldwide.

== August 17, 1977 (Wednesday) ==
- The Soviet icebreaker Arktika became the first surface ship to reach the North Pole.
- Police in Spain foiled a plot to assassinate King Juan Carlos, Prime Minister Adolfo Suarez and Queen Sophia, after being alerted to a bomb planted beneath a bridge along the royal party's travel route. The king, queen and premier had spent the day at the Majorca Yacht Club and King Juan Carlos was preparing to drive back to the Marivent Palace, the royal summer residence. Police received a tip that the GRAPO terrorist group had placed the bomb.
- Born:
  - Thierry Henry, French footballer with 123 caps as striker for the France national team between 1997 and 2010; in Les Ulis, Essonne département
  - William Gallas, French footballer with 84 caps as centre back for the France national team from 2002 to 2010; in Asnières-sur-Seine, Hauts-de-Seine département
  - Bader Al-Kharafi, Kuwaiti businessman and CEO of the Zain Group telecommunications company; in London
- Died:
  - Delmer Daves, 73, American film producer
  - U.S. Marine Captain Victor Maghakian, 61, American war hero awarded the Navy Cross for leading the Makin Island raid, died of colon cancer.

== August 18, 1977 (Thursday) ==
- Japan's Prime Minister Takeo Fukuda delivered an address at the Manila summit of the Association of Southeast Asian Nations (ASEAN), announcing what would become known as the "Fukuda Doctrine." Fukuda pledged to work to build the economies of the ASEAN members (Indonesia, Malaysia, the Philippines, Singapore and Thailand).
- Steve Biko, the black South African leader of the Black Consciousness Movement, was arrested at a police roadblock near Grahamstown and charged with violating a government order limiting him to King William's Town. Biko was imprisoned in Pretoria and would be beaten to death in police custody, dying on September 12.
- On the final day of the 11th National Congress of the Chinese Communist Party, the Party's Central Committee approved addition of the "Four Freedoms" (including the right to place big-character posters without fear of retribution) to the nation's Constitution.
- A non-binding referendum was held on the Caribbean island of Nevis on the issue of whether to separate from the British colony of Saint Christopher-Nevis-Anguilla. The vote was 4,193 for and only 14 against.
- U.S. Senator Hubert H. Humphrey of Minnesota announced that he had terminal bladder cancer. Senator Humphrey, who had been the Vice president of the United States from 1965 to 1969, and was the Democratic nominee for U.S. president in the 1968 election, died of cancer on January 13, less than five months after his announcement.
- The private funeral of Elvis Presley was held at his mansion, Graceland, at Memphis, Tennessee, where he had died two days earlier. Before the service, attended by 200 family members, 3,500 mourning fans had filed past his coffin during the visitation.

== August 19, 1977 (Friday) ==
- The 23-member Politburo of the Chinese Communist Party, the de facto policy makers of the People's Republic of China, was approved by the CCP's Central Committee. Only 12 of the members from the previous Politburo remained, with five having died (including Chairman Mao Zedong and Vice Chairmen Zhou Enlai and Kang Sheng, and the members of the Gang of Four (including former Vice Chairman Wang Hongwen) having been dismissed. Alternate member Wu Guixian was promoted to full membership, while Hua Guofeng, Deng Xiaoping, Li Xiannian and Wang Dongxing joined Ye Jianying a Chairman and four Vice Chairmen.
- An 8.3 magnitude earthquake, the strongest of 1977, struck off of the coast of the island of Sumbawa in Indonesia, and caused a tsunami that killed 189 people.
- The comet 101P/Chernykh was discovered by Soviet astronomer Nikolai Chernykh, and calculated later to have an orbital period that would bring it back to the Solar System every 15.8 years.
- Died: Groucho Marx (Julius Henry Marx), 86, American comedian and leader of film's Marx Brothers, later a popular TV game show host known for You Bet Your Life.

== August 20, 1977 (Saturday) ==
- The United States launched the Voyager 2 interplanetary probe. Voyager 2 and Voyager 1, sent up two weeks later, were probes of the outer planets of the Solar System with a specific launch window chosen in 1966 for the "Grand Tour program", after Jet Propulsion Laboratory aerospace engineer Gary Flandro pointed out the approach of a rare opportunity for exploration of Jupiter, Saturn, Uranus and Neptune with one spacecraft, reaching Jupiter in 1979, Saturn in 1981, Uranus in 1986 and Neptune in 1989. Voyager 2 would depart the Solar System by 2018 and enter interstellar space. Voyager 2, like Voyager 1, carried with it a copy of the "Voyager Golden Record", a phonograph record with multiple recorded sounds and 115 images "selected to portray the diversity of life and culture on Earth" in 1977, in case the probe was later found by intelligent life.
- Hua Guofeng, the Chairman of the Chinese Communist Party and de facto leader of the People's Republic of China, declared that the Cultural Revolution that began in 1966 was finally over. Hua's announcement, made in the closing address of the Party's 11th National Congress, was reported nationwide by the Chinese news agency, and was followed by celebrations. Hua said that the purge of the "Gang of Four" marked "the triumphant conclusion of our first Great Proletarian Cultural Revolution, which lasted 11 years, and added that "Now, we arae able to achieve stability and unity and attain great order across the land in compliance with Chairman Mao's instructions."
- Born: Felipe Contepomi and Manuel Contepomi, Argentine professional rugby union players for the Argentina national team; in Buenos Aires. Felipe had 87 caps as fly-half and centre from 1998 to 2013; Manuel had 32 caps as centre from 1998 to 2007

== August 21, 1977 (Sunday) ==
- The 250-foot (76 m) long Canadian freighter SS Kamloops was located almost 50 years after it sank on Lake Superior during a winter storm. Bodies of some victims were recovered in the spring, but the ship would remain missing for almost 50 years until its August 21, 1977 discovery by two scuba divers near Isle Royale on the U.S. side of Lake Superior.
- In Lebanon, 13 people were killed during worship services when a group of Druze from the Lebanese National Movement attacked the Christian St. George's Church.
- In eastern Rhodesia, 16 people were shot to death by guerrillas of the Zimbabwe African National Liberation Army (ZANLA), who had crossed over from Mozambique. The attack on the property, owned by white Rhodesian farmer Marty Marius Sleigh, took place 17 miles (27 km) north of Unitali. All of the victims were black Rhodesians.

== August 22, 1977 (Monday) ==
- What would become known as "El Diálogo", a dialogue between Communist officials of Cuba and Cuban exiles who had fled the nation when Fidel Castro took power in 1959, began with a meeting in Panama between Miami banker Bernardo Benes and a group of aides to Castro who were instructed to seek negotiations for diplomatic relations between Cuba and the United States. The negotiations would result in the release of 3,600 Cuban political prisoners in 1978.
- The largest rock and roll music concert in a Communist nation up to that time, the Bijelo Dugme event, took place in Yugoslavia at Košutnjak Park in Belgrade and was attended by around 80,000 people.

== August 23, 1977 (Tuesday) ==
- The first human-powered aircraft flight was successfully made by the Gossamer Condor, designed by Paul MacCready and piloted by Bryan Allen, a bicyclist and hang glider pilot. Allen pedaled the Gossamer Condor to a speed allowing it to lift off from Minter Field near Shafter, California. He then remained aloft long enough to steer the aircraft in a figure-eight course. MacCready became the first winner of the Kremer Prize of £50,000 British pounds (equivalent at the time to US$87,500), set aside by Henry Kremer in a 1959 challenge.
- The popular VHS (Video Home System) cassette, recorder and player, which would become the standard for videotape viewing, filming and rental in the 1980s and 1990s, were introduced to the United States. The RCA unit, called the VST200 and marketed as the Vidstar, had been designed by Japan's Matsushita company
- Sri Lanka began its program of forcibly resettling 25,000 members of its Tamil minority in an attempt to end widespread violence in fighting with the Sinhalese majority. The Tamils affected were taken by bus from Sri Lanka's central and northwestern towns and moved to the island nation's northern and eastern provinces.
- Marvin Mandel, the incumbent governor of the U.S. state of Maryland, was convicted of one account of racketeering and 17 counts of mail fraud. His conviction was the first for an incumbent U.S. state governor since Warren McCray of Indiana had been convicted of mail fraud in 1924. Mandel would continue to have the title of governor until his formal sentencing on October 7, although Lieutenant Governor Blair Lee ran the state as acting governor.
- Country music signer Waylon Jennings was arrested, along with Lori Evans and Mark Rothbaum arrested in a drug raid conducted by the DEA in Nashville, Tennessee at American Studios.
- Born:
  - Jack Wu (stage name for Lok Yin), Hong Kong television actor; in Hong Kong
  - Jelena Rozga, Croatian pop music singer; in Split, SR Croatia, Yugoslavia
  - Jared Fogle, spokesman in commercials for Subway restaurants for 15 years before being arrested for being a sex offender; in Indianapolis
- Died:
  - Sebastian Cabot, 59, British-born Canadian television and film actor, died of a stroke.
  - Seiichi Niikuni, 51, Japanese poet, died of a sudden illness.
  - George Strock, 66, American journalist and photographer

== August 24, 1977 (Wednesday) ==
- U.S. President Carter issued the top secret Presidential Directive 18, titled "U.S. National Strategy". The strategy change in PD-18, following the recommendations of National Security Advisor Zbigniew Brzezinski directed the U.S. military to form the Rapid Deployment Joint Task Force, a "deployable force of light division" that could be dispatched on short notice to respond to any conflict in South Korea, the Middle East or the Persian Gulf, as well as increased spending on conventional military force in Western Europe in order to defend its NATO allies.
- The sinking of a ferryboat killed almost 250 people in Bangladesh. The vessel was carrying 350 passengers when it collided with a cargo vessel on the Shitalakshya River and capsized near Dhaka. Another 100 passengers and crew were able to reach safety.
- In East Africa, the Rusumo Agreement was signed at the Rwandan town of Rusumo was signed by representatives of Rwanda, Burundi, Tanzania and Uganda to establish a joint organization for the management and development of the Kagera River shared by the four nations.
- Born:
  - John Green, American novelist, author of The Fault in Our Stars; in Indianapolis
  - Denilson de Oliveira Araujo, Brazilian footballer with 61 caps for the Brazil national team; in Diadema, São Paulo state
  - Jürgen Macho, Austrian footballer and goalkeeper with 26 caps for the Austria national team; in Vienna

== August 25, 1977 (Thursday) ==
- The serial killer team of Wolfgang Abel and Marco Furlan committed their first of at least 10 murders (and possibly as many as 28), starting in Italy with an attack in Verona on a drug addict who was sleeping in his car and was burned to death when the vehicle was set afire with molotov cocktails. Both teenagers at the time that they started, 18-year-old Wolfgang was from Düsseldorf in West Germany, while 17-year-old Marco was from Padua in Italy. Beginning in 1980, they would begin sending letters to newspapers under the name "Ludwig". Before the duo's arrest in 1984, most of the Ludwig victims were drug addicts and homeless people. In all, the Ludwig duo would be suspected by police of 28 deaths and 39 injuries.

== August 26, 1977 (Friday) ==
- In Moscow, a fire broke out on the 8th floor of the U.S. Embassy to the Soviet Union. According to an account written almost 40 years later, "A great deal of information was lost or stolen, some of which was classified," U.S. Ambassador Malcolm Toon reluctantly agreed to let Moscow firefighters up to the 10th floor, where the Embassy's most secret material and machinery were stored. The Embassy's Political Counselor at the time, William Andreas Brown, would tell an interviewer later that the Moscow firefighters combating the blaze had been joined by "so-called firemen... in brand new, firefighting uniforms," and had "taken advantage of the situation to exploit it as they wished, as far as sensitive files, equipment, and so forth... we had to reckon with major losses of classified materials."
- By a vote of 54 to 32, the National Assembly of Quebec passed the Charter of the French Language (Law 101, La charte de la langue française) making French the official language of the Canadian province.
- Rosemarie Ackermann of East Germany became the first woman to clear a height of 2.00 meters (6'6½") in the high jump.

== August 27, 1977 (Saturday) ==
- An uprising by women market vendors began in the African nation of Guinea over the matter of President Sekou Touré's price controls and their brutal enforcement by government police. An incident at the Marché Madina, the public market in the capital, Conakry, led to rioting in the city and spread to other parts of the nation. The end result was that Touré would relax his restrictions on trade, release hundreds of political prisoners, and offer amnesty to people who had fled the country.
- Bermuda's Premier, John Sharpe, resigned after a dispute with other members of his ruling United Bermuda Party, and was replaced by Finance Minister David Gibbons.
- The second Whitbread Round the World Race started in England from Portsmouth as 15 boats set out to circumnavigate the Earth in a 26,780 nautical miles— 30,818 miles (49,597 km) — course. The Dutch yacht Flyer, skippered by Conny van Rietschoten, would return to England first, 136 days later, on January 10, 1978.
- Born: Deco (Anderson Luís de Souza), Portuguese footballer, with 75 caps for the Portugal national team; in São Bernardo do Campo, São Paulo state

== August 28, 1977 (Sunday) ==
- In a televised speech, General Francisco Morales Bermudez, President of the South American nation of Peru, announced the lifting of a 14-month national emergency.
- In the United States, the New York Cosmos won the championship of the North American Soccer League, the highest-level professional soccer football league in the U.S., defeating the Seattle Sounders, 2 to 1, in Soccer Bowl '77 before a crowd of 35,548 in Portland, Oregon. The game marked the farewell for Pelé, the Brazilian forward who had spiked interest in the U.S. for soccer when he signed to play for the Cosmos.

== August 29, 1977 (Monday) ==
- The first of two major fires at film vaults of the U.S. National Archives took place at Suitland, Maryland, when nitrocellulose film stock ignited, destroying one million feet of irreplaceable footage from the newsreel series The March of Time, equivalent to 75,000 minutes worth of the 20-minute film preview features. A second fire, on December 7, 1978, would destroy 70% of the Archives' stock of Universal newsreel footage.

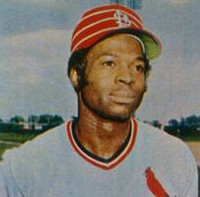
Brock

- U.S. baseball player Lou Brock of the St. Louis Cardinals broke the 49-year-old record for most stolen bases in a career. During the seventh inning of a game against the San Diego Padres, Brock ran from first to second for his 893rd steal, breaking the record that Ty Cobb had at career's end in 1928. In 1974, Brock had stolen 118 bases in one season, having broken the record of Maury Wills.
- Born: Vishal (stage name for Vishal Krishna Reddy), Indian actor and producer of Tamil-language films; in Madras, Tamil Nadu state
- Died: Jean Hagen (stage name for Jean Shirley Verhagen), 54, American film and TV actress, died of esophogeal cancer.

== August 30, 1977 (Tuesday) ==
- U.S. President Carter issued a statement committing the United States to involvement in Northern Ireland rather than considering it a domestic matter for the United Kingdom. Carter declared, "The United States wholeheartedly supports peaceful means for finding a just solution that involves both parts of the community of Northern Ireland, and protects human rights and guarantees freedom from discrimination— a solution that the people in Northern Ireland, as well as the Governments of Great Britain and Ireland can support." Carter added that if progress was made for "the establishment of a form of Government in Northern Ireland which will command widespread acceptance throughout both parts of the community... the United States would be prepared to join with others to see how additional job-creating investment could be encouraged to the benefit of all the people of Northern Ireland."
- Wang Youping arrived in Moscow to become the new Ambassador from Communist China to the Soviet Union, filling a vacancy that had existed for 18 months.
- Born: Felix Sanchez, U.S.-born Dominican Republic track and field athlete with two Olympic gold medals in the 400 metre hurdles; in New York City
- Died: Erny Pinckert, 70, American college football star

== August 31, 1977 (Wednesday) ==
- The highest altitude ever attained by a jet airplane taking off from the ground without benefit of rocket power or being carried part of the way by another aircraft was attained by Soviet Russian test pilot Aleksandr Fedotov. Taking off from Podmoskovnoye in a MiG-25, Fedotov climbed to 123,520 feet (37,650 m) or almost 23.4 miles above the Earth, higher than the previous record set by him on July 25, 1973 of 118,900 feet (36,200 m).
- Elections were held in the white minority-ruled African nation of Rhodesia for the 66-member Rhodesian House of Assembly. White voters— 1% of the population— were allowed to choose 50 of the 66 seats from the "European roll" candidates, while black voters could pick 8 "African roll" seats. The other 8 seats were reserved for tribal representatives selected by the Chiefs of the Tribes. The slate of candidates from Prime Minister Ian Smith's Rhodesian Front captured all 50 of the European seats while 12 MPs who had deserted the RF to form the Rhodesian Action Party were not re-elected.
- The government of South Africa announced that it was annexing Walvis Bay, the only deepwater harbor in Namibia, which was still being administered as South-West Africa by the white minority government.
- Lyle Lane became the first diplomatic representative to Cuba since 1961, as he arrived in Havana with his staff to move into the offices of the U.S. Embassy. Lane was not an ambassador, but had the title "Chief of the U.S. Interests Section in Cuba".
- The U.S.S.R. re-introduced its national anthem, State Anthem of the Soviet Union, with new lyrics for the first time in more than 20 years, with a performance at the Bolshoi Theatre. The anthem became official the next day at 6:00 in the morning as it was played on the radio, and at the start of the day's television broadcasting. Singing of the anthem had been banned after the discrediting of the late Soviet dictator Joseph Stalin.
- Meeting in the U.S. in Honolulu, delegates to the World Psychiatric Association's sixth World Congress of Psychiatry approved a resolution condemning the Soviet Union for "the abuse of psychiatry for political purposes".
- The Battle of Jijiga, one of the largest in the Ogaden War during Somalia's invasion of Ethiopia, began and would last for several weeks before the capture of the city of Jijiga on September 12.
- Born:
  - Ian Harte, Irish footballer with 64 caps for the Ireland national team; in Drogheda, Leinster province
  - Jeff Hardy, American professional wrestler; in Cameron, North Carolina
