= Guinea National Library and Archives =

Guinea National Library and Archives refer collectively to two closely related institutions of the Republic of Guinea:

- National Library of Guinea
- National Archives of Guinea

Both institutions are located in Conakry and they have previously been collocated.
