= List of buildings and structures in Guinea =

A list of notable buildings and structures in Guinea by city:

== Conakry ==
=== Hospitals ===
- Donka Hospital
- Ignace Deen Hospital
- Clinique Ambroise Paré
- Clinique Pasteur

=== Hotels ===
- Grand Hotel de l'Unite
- Hotel Camayene
- Hotel du Golfe
- Hotel del Niger
- Hôtel Océane
- Hotel Petit Bateau
- Hotel Le Rocher
- Hotel le Sogue
- Le Meridien Mariador Palace
- Maison d Accueil
- Novotel Grand Hotel de L'Independance, Conakry
- Le Riviera Royal Hotel

=== Markets ===
- Marché Madina
- Marché du Niger

=== Palaces and museums ===
- Casa de Belle Vue
- Center Culturel Franco Guineen
- Sandervalia National Museum
- Palais de Nations
- Presidential Palace
- Palais du Peuple

=== Parks and gardens ===
- Jardin 2 Octubre
- Conakry Botanical Garden

=== Places of worship ===
- Cathedrale Sainte-Marie
- Paroisse Saint Michel
- Grande Mosque Fayçal

=== Schools ===
- College Gbessia Centre
- College-Lycee Sainte-Marie
- Gamal Abdel Nasser University (Institut Polytechnique de Conakry)
- Institut Geographique National (Guinea)
- Université Kofi Annan

=== Other ===
- 8 November Bridge
- Camp Boiro
- Conakry International Airport
- Monument du 22 Novembre 1970
- National Archives of Guinea
- National Library of Guinea
- Stade du 28 Septembre
Conakry Grand Mosque

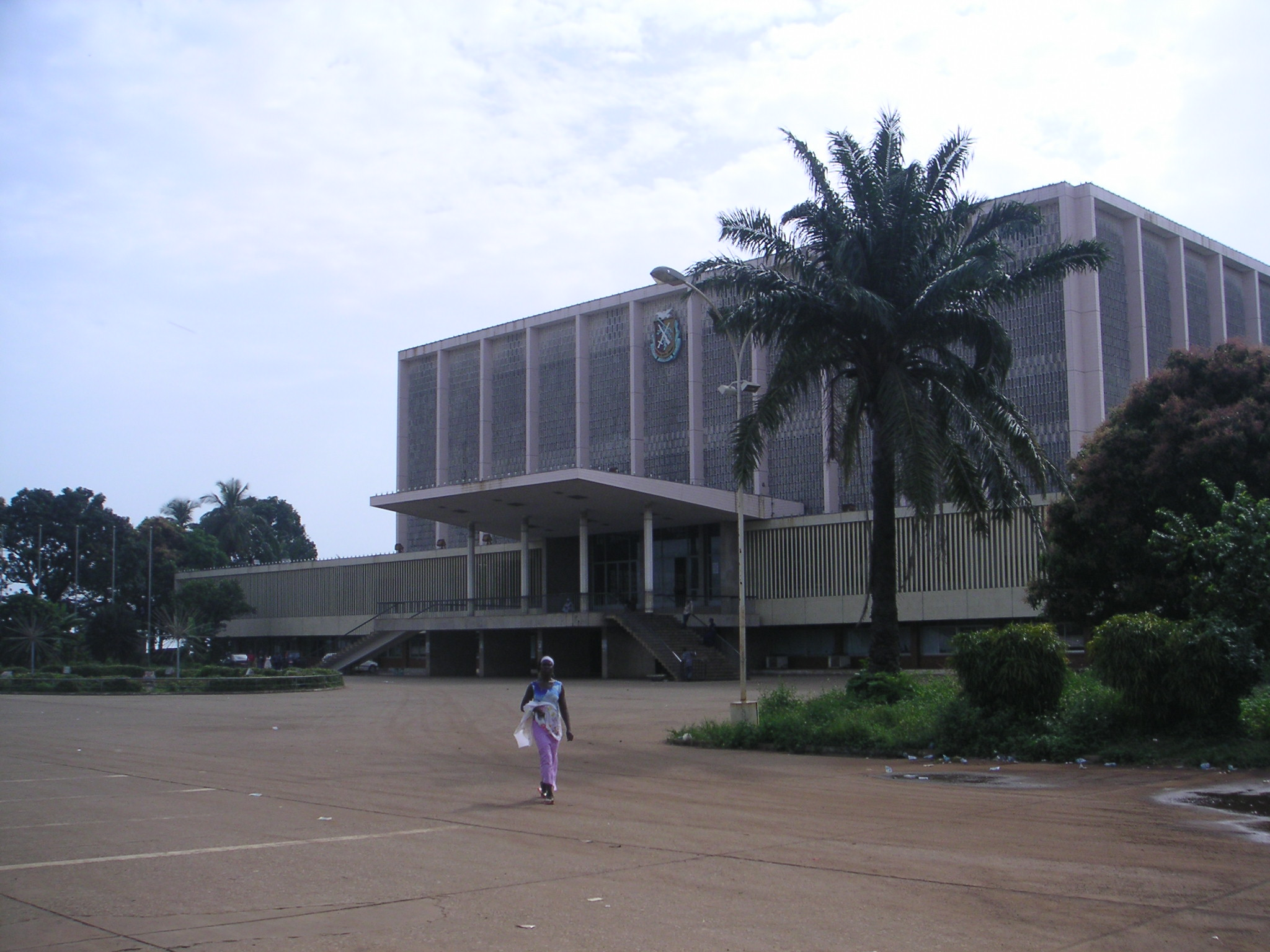
Palais du Peuple

== Dalaba ==
- Restaurant Hidalgo
- Sib Hotel Fouta

== Guéckédou ==
- Guéckédou Hospital
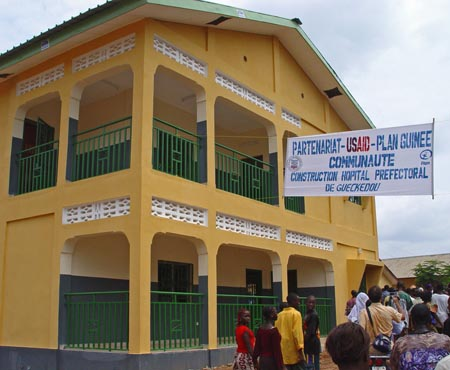
Guéckédou Hospital

== Kankan ==
- Hote de la Gare
- Hotel Bate
- Institut Polytechnique de Kankan
- Kankan Airport
- Julius Nyerere University of Kankan (Université de Kankan)
- Kankan Kabada Health Centre
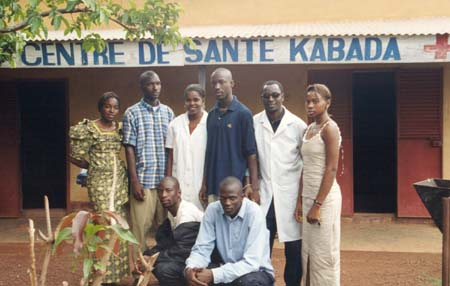
Kankan Kabada Health Centre

== Kindia ==
- Hotel Flamboyant
- Kahere Eila Poultry Farming School
- Kindia University

== Kissidougou ==
- Hotel Mandela
- Hotel Mantise Palace
- Hotel Savanah
- Kissidougou Airport
- Kissidougou Ethnology Museum
- Kissidougou Hospital
- Kissidougou Market
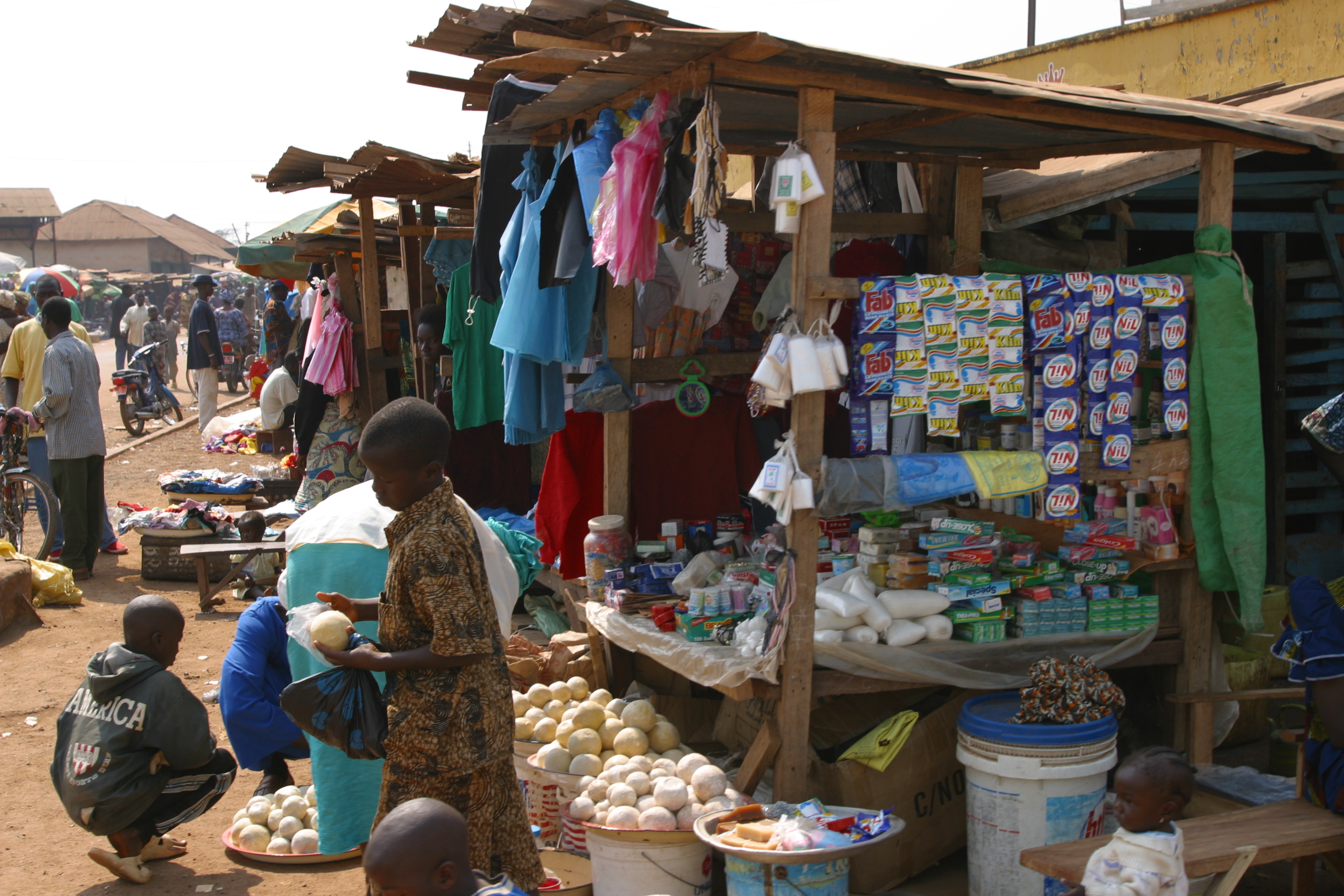
Kissidougou Market

== Koundara ==
- Musée Fédérale Annexe de Koundara
- Koundara Ethnology Museum

== Labé ==
- Hotel du Tourisme
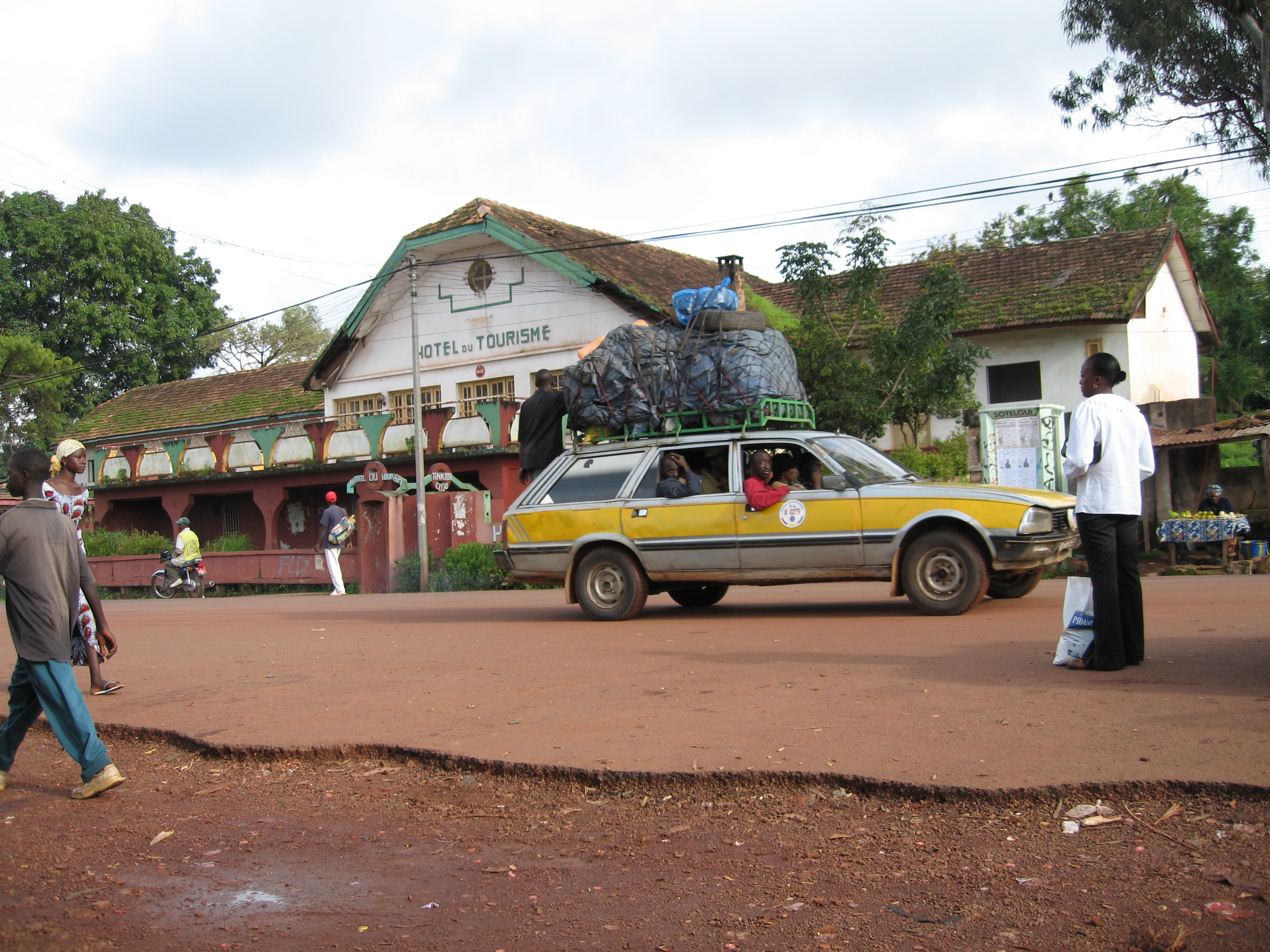
Hotel du Tourisme, Labé

== Macenta ==
- Hotel Bamala
- Hotel Palm
- Macenta Airport

== Mamou ==
- Hotel Baly
- Mamou Market
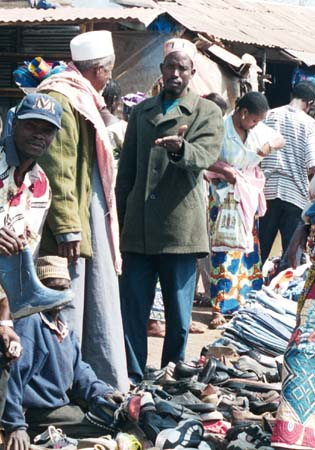
Mamou Market

== Nzérékoré ==
- Auberge Golo
- Club Hanoi
- Hospital Market Stadium
- Hotel Bakoli
- Hotel Haida
- Hotel le Destin
- Hotel Le Mont Nimba
- Musee Ethnographique
- L'Université de N’Zérékoré
- Université du Developpement Communautaire
- Nzérékoré Hospital
- Nimba Market
- Nzérékoré Mosque
