= Marché du Niger =

Market in Conakry, Guinea

Coordinates: 9°30′38″N 13°42′27″W

Marché du Niger (Nigerian market) is a market in Conakry, Guinea, slightly smaller than the other main market in the city, Marché Madina. It sells fruits and vegetables but reportedly has an issue with pickpocketing.

== See also ==
- List of buildings and structures in Guinea
