= Hotel Mariador Palace =

Hotel in Conakry, Guinea

Hotel Mariador Palace Hôtel Mariador Palace
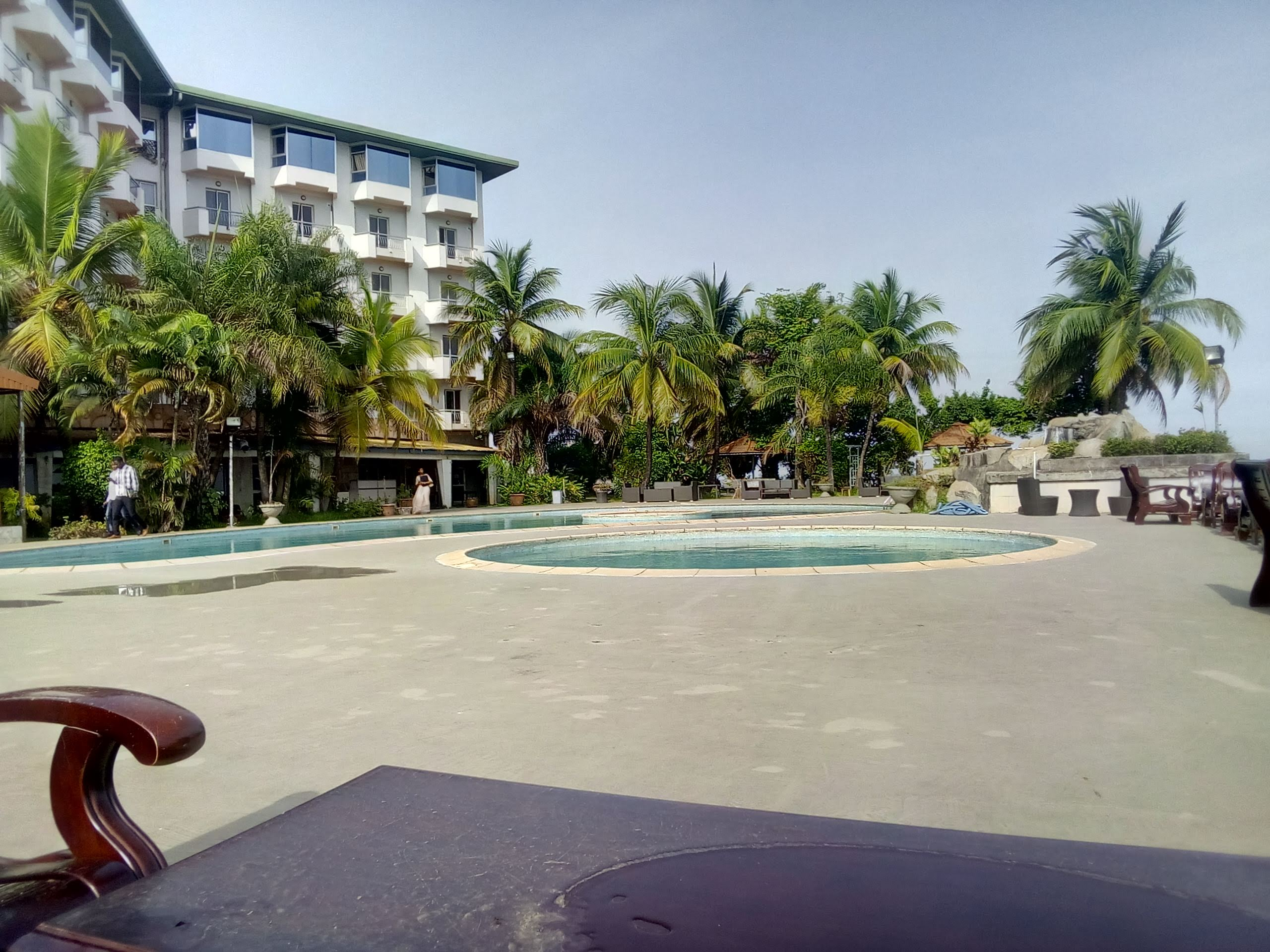

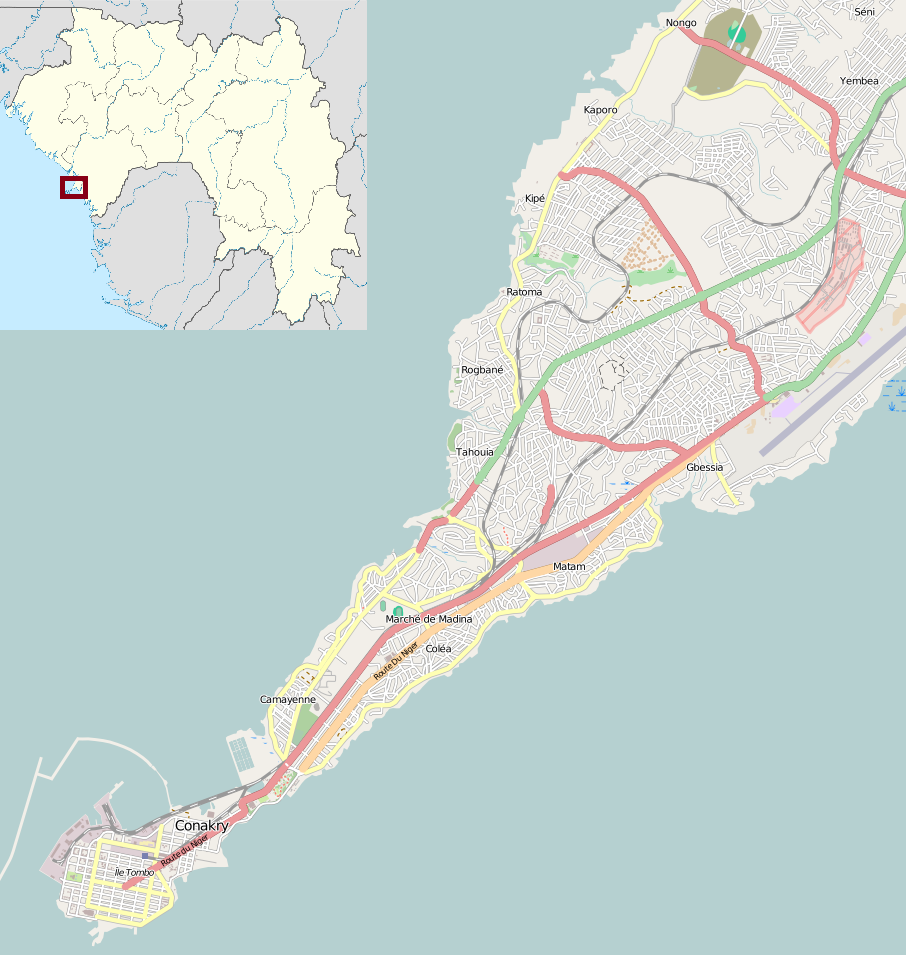
- Location within Conakry

General information
- Location: Conakry, Guinea
- Coordinates: 9.58941°N 13.658744°W
- Opening: 1999

Technical details
- Floor count: 4

Other information
- Number of rooms: 96
- Number of suites: 8
- Number of restaurants: 1

Website
- http://www.hotelsmariador.com/

The Hotel Mariador Palace (French: Hôtel Mariador Palace) is a hotel in Conakry, Guinea. It is situated in the Quartier de Ratoma area of the city. The hotel was built in 1999, using investment from the Far East. It is the third of a chain started by Guinean entrepreneur Mohamed Lamine Sylla in 1987.

== Location and facilities ==
The Mariador Palace is a four-storey luxury hotel in Ratoma, Conakry, with 96 Rooms. It is in a residential part of Conakry, about 15 minutes by road from Conakry International Airport to the east. It situated beside the sea, and has a large terrace with a swimming pool and a covered area with an impressive thatched roof. There is an International restaurant, and a shopping arcade. The air conditioned rooms have balconies overlooking the sea. The hotel is decorated with local artisans' products.

== See also ==
- List of buildings and structures in Guinea
