= Marché Madina (Conakry) =

Market in Conakry, Guinea

Coordinates: 9°32′32″N 13°40′2″W

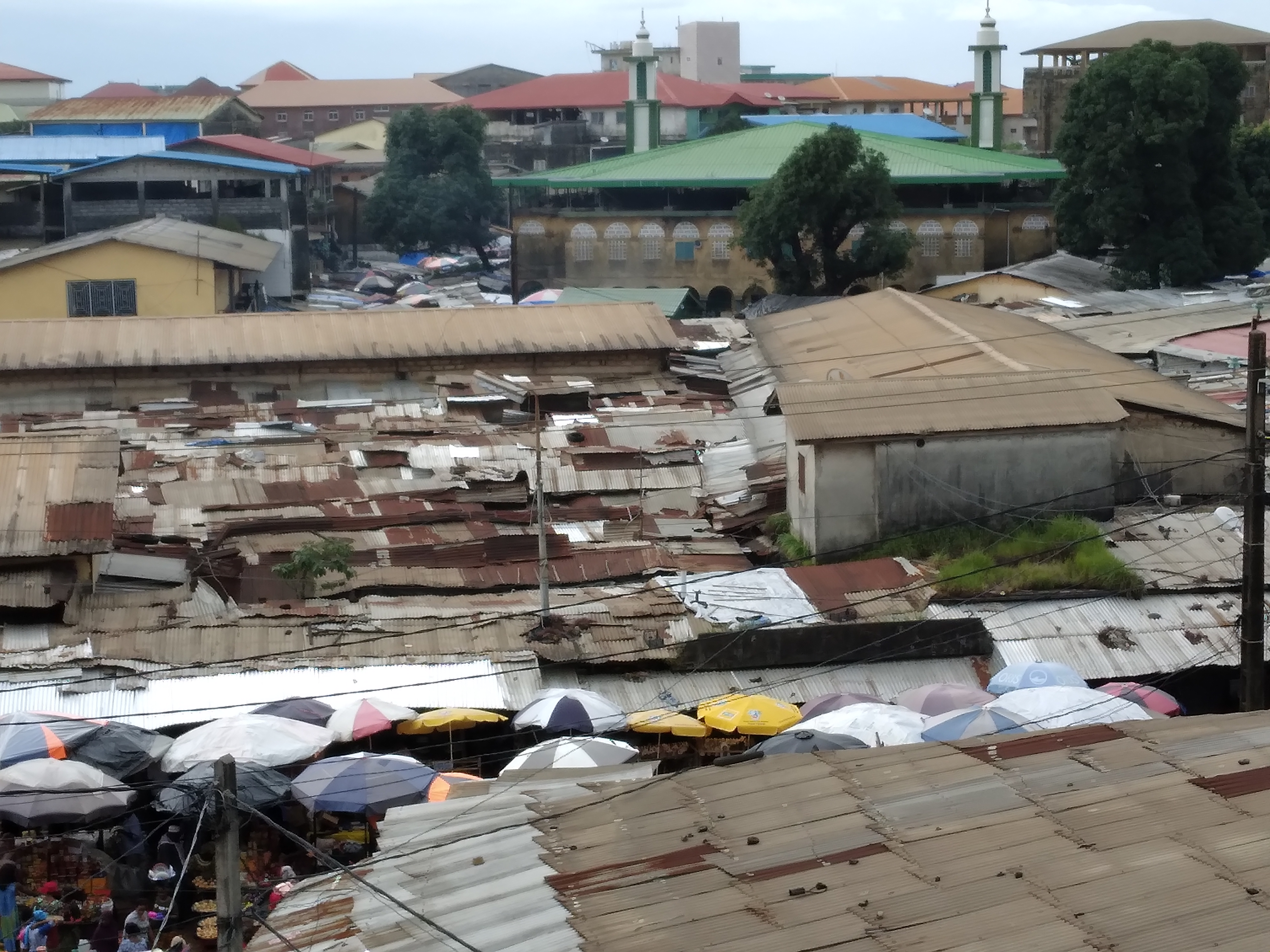

Marché Medina is a market in Conakry, Guinea and one of the largest markets in West Africa. The market was the scene of the Guinean Market Women's Revolt in 1977 that marketed a turning point in the country's economic history and was celebrated as a national holiday following the end of President Ahmed Sékou Touré's regime.

According to Lonely Planet it "sells anything from Chinese housewares to indigo cloth" and old magazines. Like Marché du Niger, it also sells a wide range of fruit and vegetables.

== See also ==
- List of buildings and structures in Guinea
