= Palais du Peuple (Guinea) =

Building in Conakry, Guinea

Coordinates: 9°31′11.9″N 13°41′32.4″W

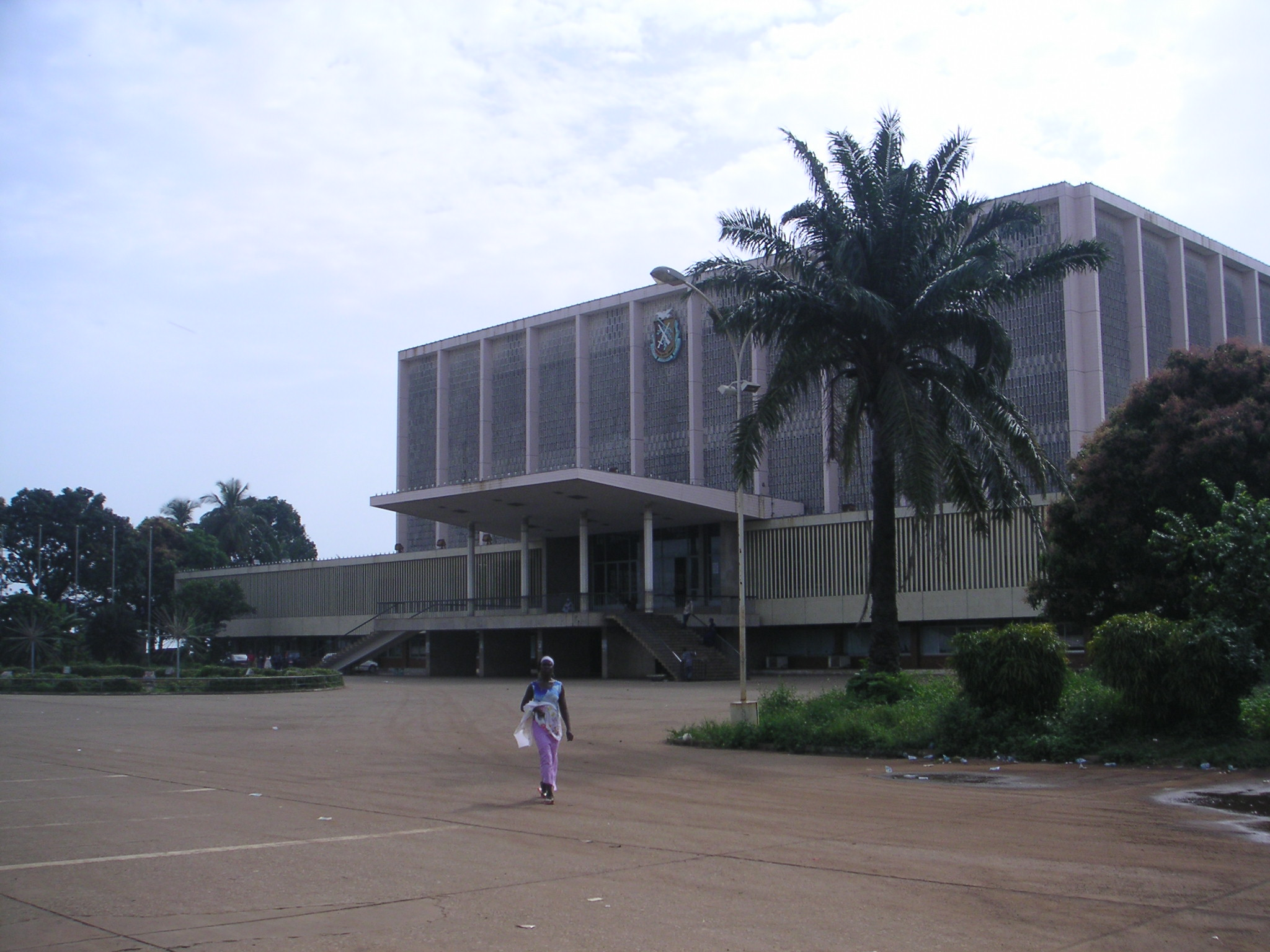
Palais du Peuple in Conakry

The Palais du Peuple (Palace of the People) is a convention center in Conakry, Guinea. In 2008, it was renovated prior to celebrations for Guinea's 50th anniversary of independence.

== Gallery ==
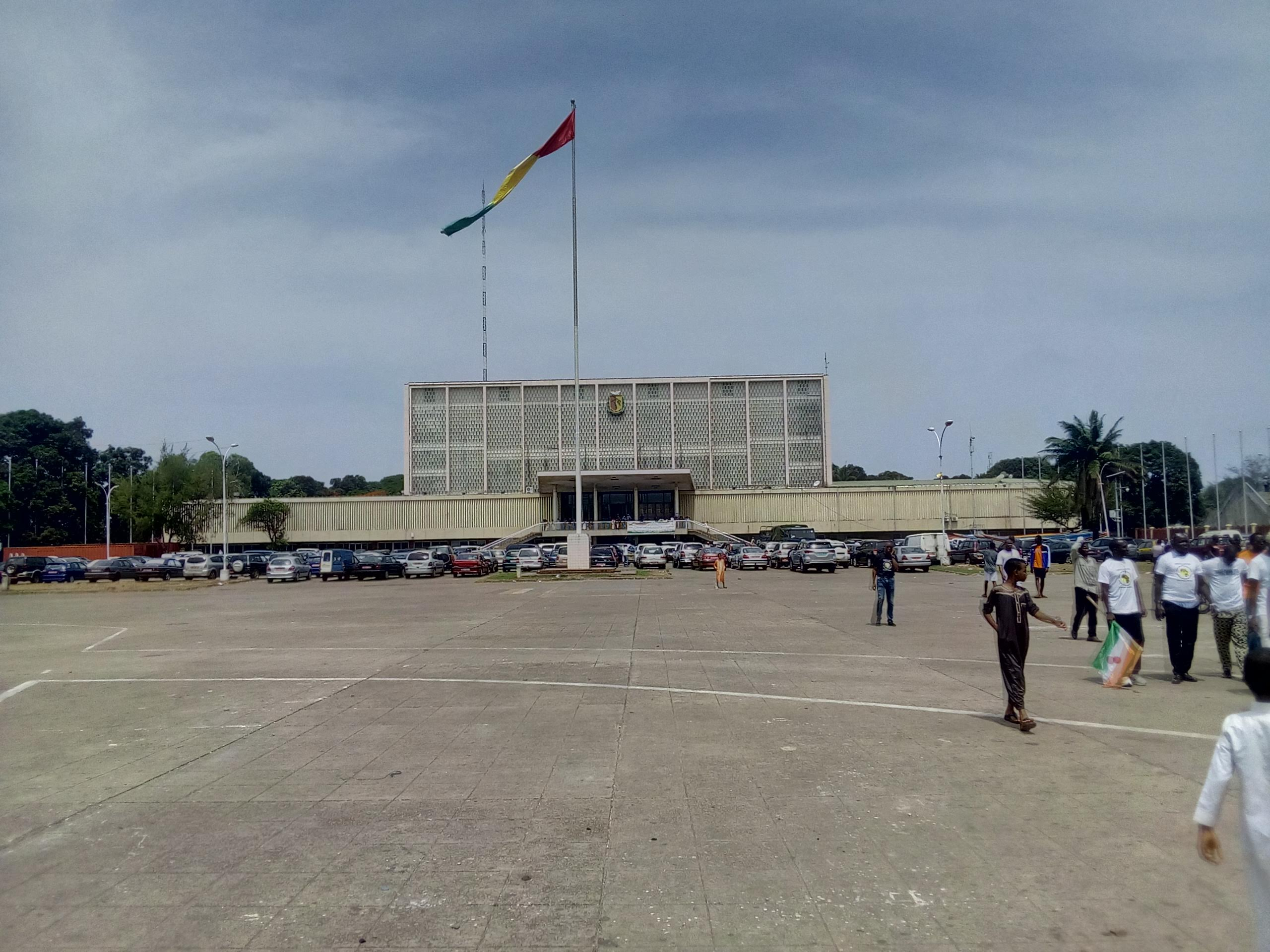
Palais du peuple

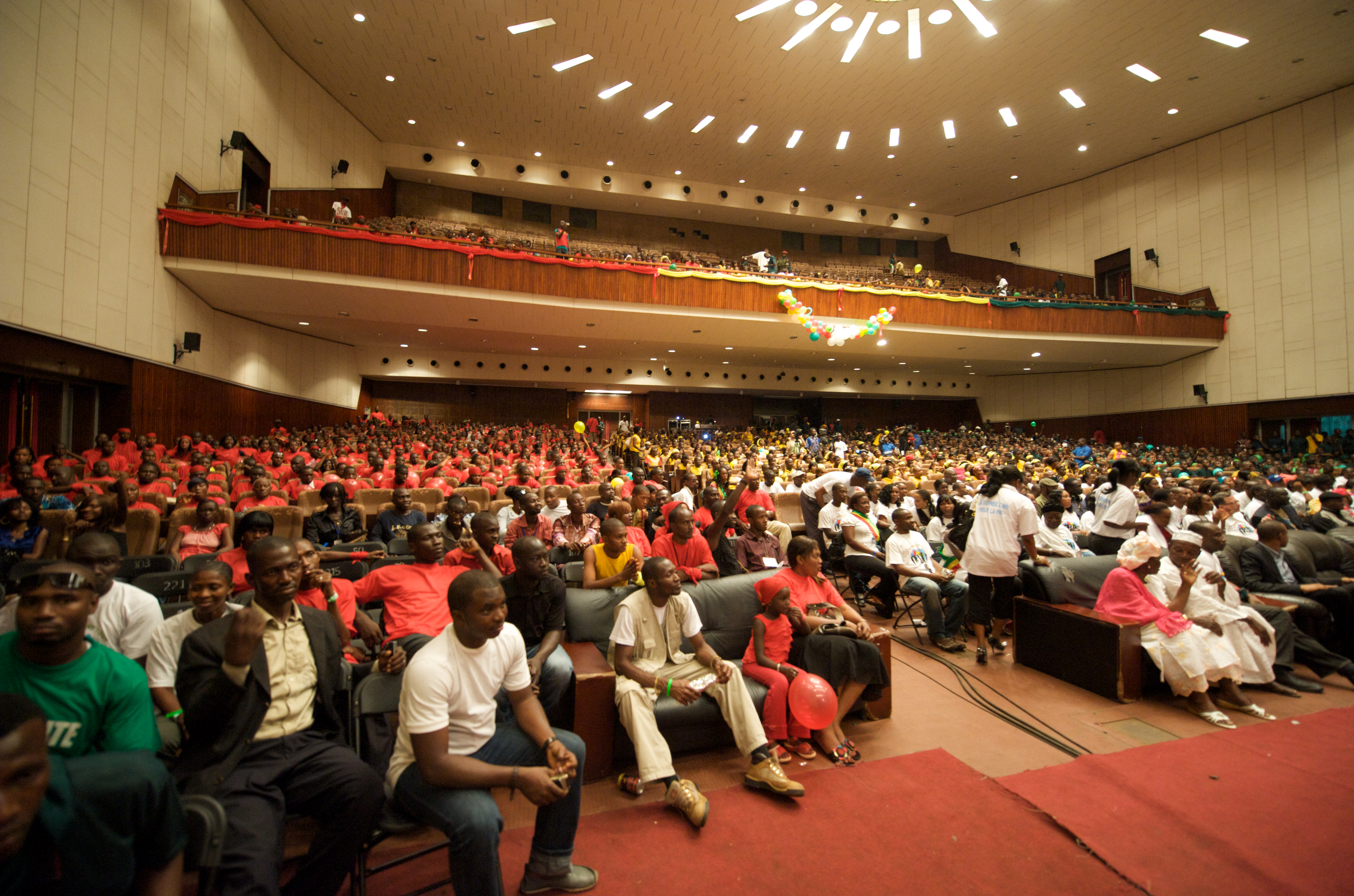

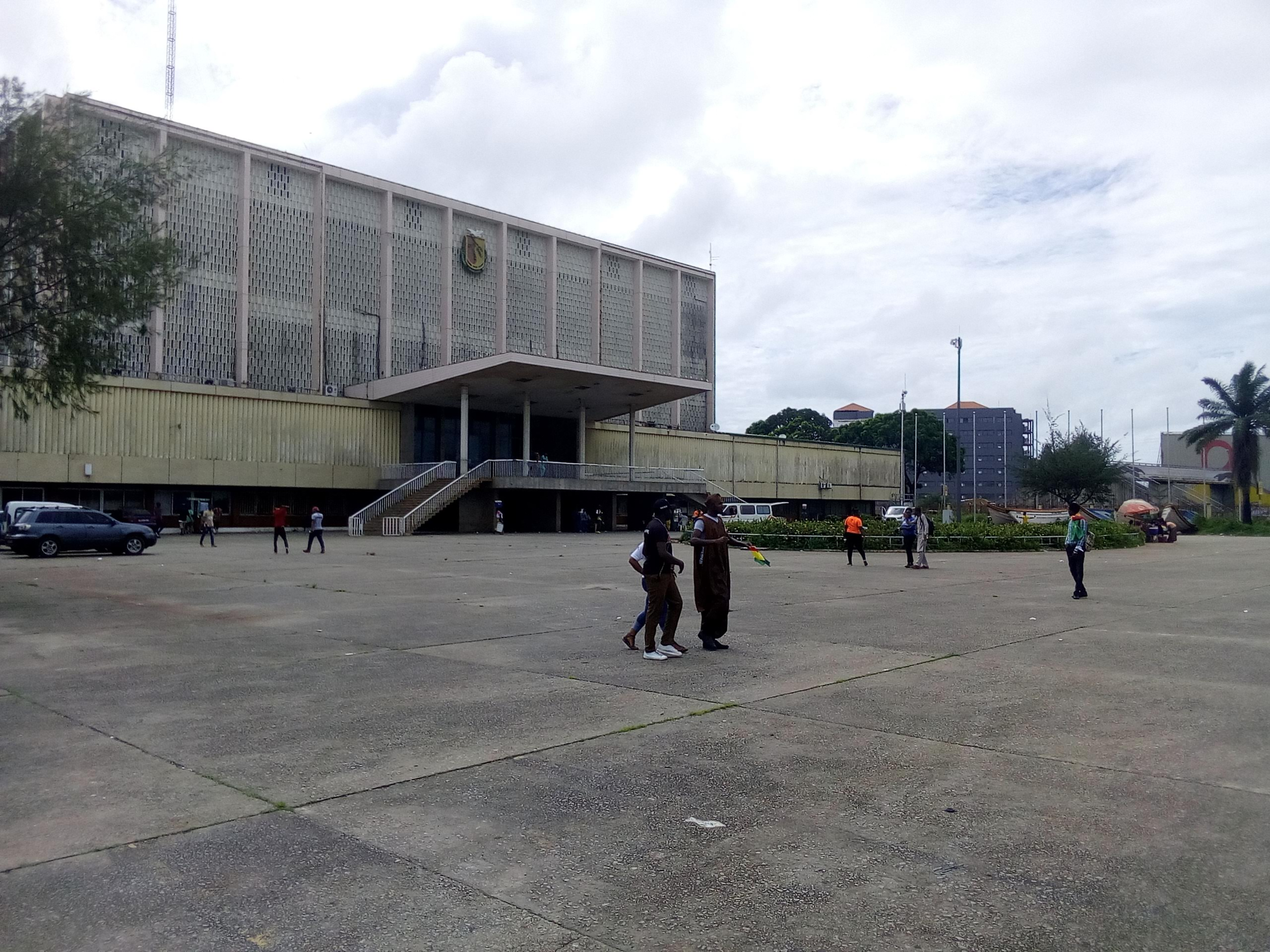
Palais du peuple

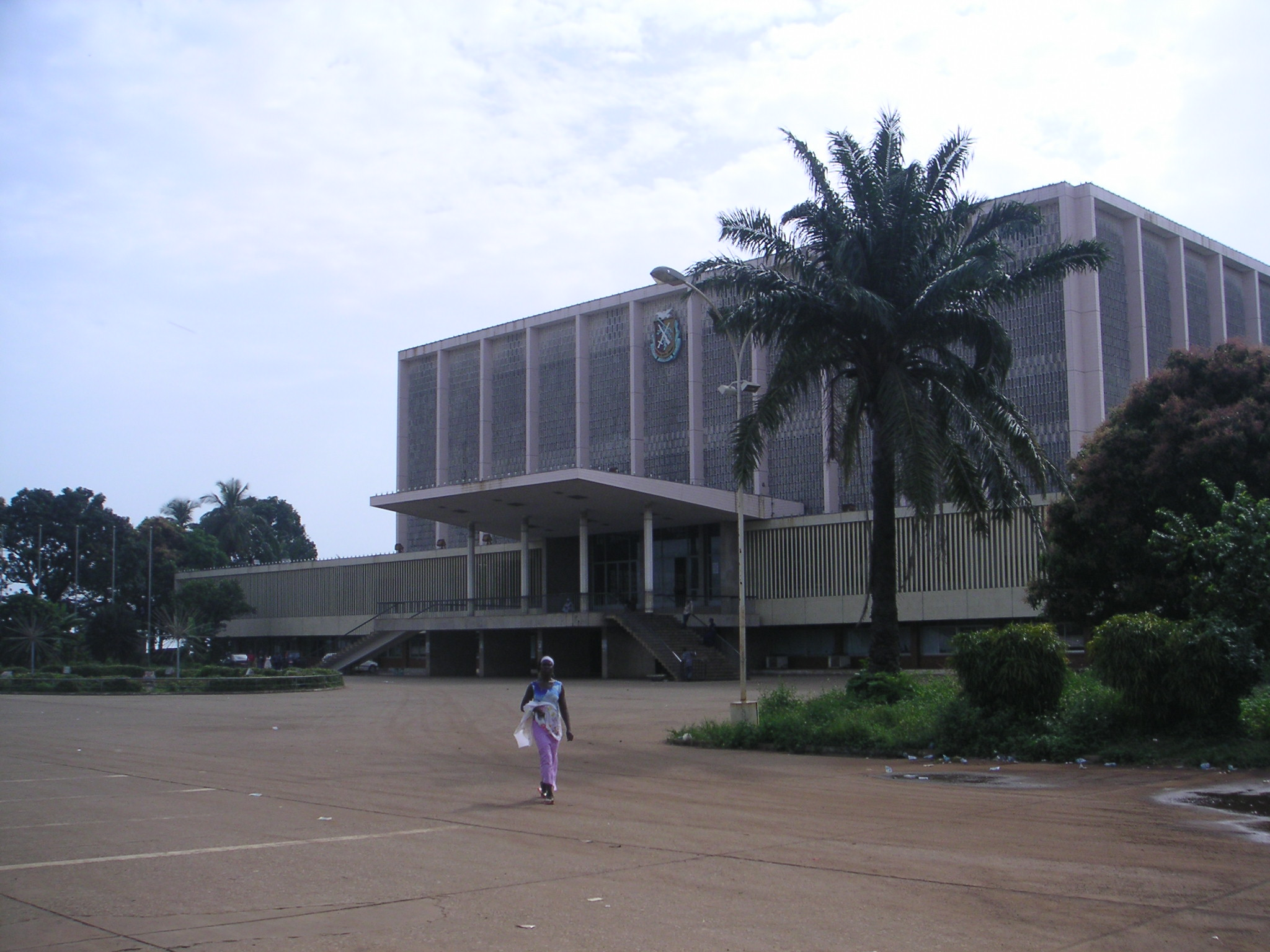
Palais du peuple

== See also ==
- List of buildings and structures in Guinea
