= National Archives of Guinea =

- Interactive map of National Archives of Guinea
- 9.513692724659704°N 13.706340531722653°W
- Alternative name: Les Archives Nationales
- Location: Conakry, Guinea
- Type: national archives

The National Archives of Guinea were established in the 1960s after the country gained its independence. They have been moved three times since then and are currently situated in the capital city of Conakry. As of around 1995, the archives had a collection of over 3,000 volumes.

== See also ==
- List of national archives
- List of buildings and structures in Guinea
- National Library of Guinea
