= Wolfgang Abel and Marco Furlan =

German-Italian serial killer duo

- Born: Wolfgang Abel; 25 March 1959; Düsseldorf, North Rhine-Westphalia, West Germany Marco Furlan; 16 January 1960 (age 66); Padua, Italy
- Died: Wolfgang Abel; 25 October 2024 (aged 65); Negrar di Valpolicella, Italy
- Other name: "Ludwig"
- Status: Released (Furlan); Deceased (Abel)
- Conviction: Murder
- Penalty: 27 years in Prison - reduced from 30 years

Details
- Victims: 10–15 (Note: Ten people were confirmed killed by the duo, and five more are highly considered as their victims)
- Span of crimes: 1977–1984
- Country: Italy, West Germany
- Date apprehended: 4 March 1984

Wolfgang Abel (25 March 1959 – 25 October 2024) and Marco Furlan (born 16 January 1960) were a German-Italian serial killer duo who were arrested for a series of murders in northern Italy and one in West Germany between 1977 and 1984. They claimed innocence, saying they were scapegoats for a police force that could not find the real criminals.

== Origins ==
The two members of the Ludwig group were both sons of the upper bourgeoisie of the city and came from the Verona hinterland: Marco Furlan, resident of the prestigious Borgo Trento district, was the son of the Head of the Burns Unit of the Ospedale Civile Maggiore in Verona (in this regard, many of "Ludwig"'s victims who were burned alive was emblematic) and at the time of his arrest he was about to graduate in physics at the University of Padua; Wolfgang Abel lived in Negrar di Valpolicella, where his family had moved to after a period in Munich. The son of a managing director of the Italian branch of a German insurance company, he was a graduate in mathematics with honours and worked in the same insurance company as his father.

Furlan and Abel met in high school, soon finding themselves in agreement about needing to clean up the world from everything that they thought was "deviant": prostitutes, homeless, gay people, drug addicts, "sinful" priests, nightclubs, and pornographic cinemas. Their relationship continued beyond school and was consolidated by virtue of the fact that both were part of a group of young people at the time, who used to meet in Piazza Vittorio Veneto in Borgo Trento.

== The crimes ==
At each of these crime scenes was a leaflet, written in Italian, headed with the name "Ludwig" over a Nazi eagle and swastika. Each had a slogan, such as "We are the last of the Nazis" and "Death comes to those who betray the true god", and explained the reason for each murder.

Abel and Furlan's criminal career together began on 25 August 1977 in Verona, when they burned Roma drug addict Guerrino Spinelli alive with four molotov cocktails in his Fiat 126. On 17 December 1978, the murder of homosexual waiter Luciano Stefanato followed, stabbed 30 times in Padua, with two blades later being stuck in his back. Almost a year later, on 12 December 1979, Furlan and Abel stabbed 22-year-old drug addict Claudio Costa to death in Venice. The homicidal series continued in 1980 in Vicenza, with the axe murder of 52-year-old prostitute Alice Maria Baretta. On 25 November of the same year they claimed responsibility for the first time in the crimes, by sending a letter with the name Ludwig in the Il Gazzettino newspaper's headquarters in Mestre.

They were also accused of having set a fire on 25 May 1981 to a small abandoned structure in Verona, La torretta di Lungadige San Giorgio, formerly a part of old Austrian fortifications, which had become a shelter for beggars, drug addicts, and homeless people: 17-year-old Luca Martinotti, who was spending the night there with another friend, died, while his friend was seriously injured. They were acquitted of this crime, although a letter allegedly signed by Ludwig had reached the editorial office of la Repubblica.

"LUDWIG
OUR FAITH IS NAZISM
OUR JUSTICE IS DEATH
OUR DEMOCRACY IS EXTERMINATION
LET IT BE KNOWN THAT WE HAVE PROMPTLY CLAIMED RESPONSIBILITY FOR THE FIRE AT SAN GIORGIO
IN VERONA WITH A MESSAGE
SENT TO 'LA REPUBBLICA'
WE ATTACH A METAL DISK
IDENTICAL TO ONE APPLIED ON THE
LARGEST OF THE THREE USED TORCHES
GOTT MIT UNS"

On 20 July 1982, Ludwig targeted Father Gabriele Pigato and Father Giuseppe Lovato, both 70-year-old friars of the Monte Berico in Vicenza, both attacked while walking in via Gen. Cialdini (a street that runs along the walls of the general house) and hit with hammers by the two young men: Father Gabriele died immediately, while Father Giuseppe was transported in very serious condition to the San Bartolo Hospital, where he died shortly after. On 26 February 1983, the priest Don Armando Bison was killed in Trento, he was found with an awl stuck in the skull, with a crucifix attached.

On 14 May 1983, they set fire to the red light cinema "Eros" in Milan, killing six people (including the 46-year-old doctor Livio Ceresoli, who entered the building to provide medical aid and who was posthumously awarded the Award for Civil Valor) and wounding 32 others. On 8 January 1984, they started a fire at the "Liverpool Disco" in Munich, in which an Italian waitress who worked there died, with seven others injured; this last act was claimed in a leaflet sent to some newspapers, reading: At the Liverpool, they don't fuck anymore!

== Last attack and capture ==
On the evening of 4 March 1984, the two criminals entered the Melamara Disco in Castiglione delle Stiviere in the Province of Mantua, where at the time there were 400 young people, most of whom were masked for a carnival party. In a moment of confusion, one of the two killers (disguised as a Pierrot) opened the emergency exit and let in his partner, who had two bags with as many gasoline canisters as they could carry.

Half-hidden in a dark corner, Abel and Furlan began to pour gasoline on the carpet and set it on fire. The two, however, had not taken into account the fact that the Italian public premises had to furnish fireproof coverings following the Cinema Statuto fire, which took place in Turin in February 1983. The disco's carpet was therefore flame resistant and slowed down the fire's propagation, which allowed a security officer to extinguish it.

Once discovered, the two assassins tried to attack the bouncer to escape, but they were stopped, surrounded by the crowd and finally arrested by police, who saved them from being lynched by the patrons. The number of Ludwig's attacks ended with 15 dead and 41 wounded.

== Trial ==
Abel was subjected to psychiatric examination, also requested by the defenders of Furlan, Tiburzio De Zuani and Piero Longo, but the accused refused to undergo the talks. Specialists Balloni and Reggiani claimed that Abel had a reduced ability to understand the consequences of his actions, and also claimed that he had grown up without the affective attention that allowed him to develop a healthy personality, but this was very disputed. On 10 February 1987, both were sentenced to 30 years' imprisonment, while the public prosecutor had asked for both to be sentenced to life imprisonment.

On 15 June 1988, the Court of Assizes of Venice appealed both for the beginning of imprisonment and ordered that Furlan be imprisoned in Casale di Scodosia, a town in the Province of Padua, from which Furlan fled in February 1991, just before the final sentence was handed down by Court of Cassation. He was captured in May 1995 in Crete, where he lived under a false name, and was brought back to Italy; in the meantime, on 10 April 1999, the Court of Appeal of Venice, presided by Nicola Lercario, had sentenced him to 27 years' imprisonment, with the sentence being confirmed on 11 February 1991 by the Court of Cassation. On the same occasion, Abel was also sentenced to 27 years. Shortly after the arrest in Crete, Furlan tried to commit suicide in prison by trying to hang himself on the bars with a sheet, but remained unharmed.

== Copycats ==
The name Ludwig was later taken up by other fanatics of the Italian far right, who had never had any contact with either Abel or Furlan, but through the newspapers, they were attracted by their racist ideas. They decided to organize in the city of Florence on 27 February 1990, a mass beating ensuing against street vendors and immigrant drug dealers present in various parts of the city, leaving the Italian newspapers some flyers in which they claimed aggression by signing as Ludwig. Later they went on with bomb attacks against nomad camps in Tuscany, causing numerous injuries against the Roma. Particularly bloody was a bomb attack on an immigrant camp in the Province of Pisa, where a little girl lost an eye and a hand.

These violent actions caused much outrage because some victims of the attacks were children. This increased public pressure for an intervention by the Italian Police and the Carabinieri, who arrested the perpetrators of the attacks. The culprits were younger boys than Abel and Furlan, coming from different cities and, when questioned, they said they had never met Ludwig's members in prison, but wanted to copy them.

== Release ==
On 18 April 2008, the news of the decision of the Milan Surveillance Court to disclose Marco Furlan to social services was announced. Furlan, through his lawyer, Corrado Limentani, had asked to leave prison by day to return at night and on weekends. The judicial body refused his plea for release, but assigned him to social services, taking into account the murderer's good conduct and now imminent release, scheduled for early 2009. The news did not fail to arouse controversy in public opinion: protests in this regard began by the editorial staff of newspapers and magazines. On 24 April 2008, Furlan took his second degree with honours in computer engineering, while on 12 November 2010, he was released on probation for good behaviour.

In 2009, the residential detention measure for Wolfgang Abel was changed to house arrest, discounted in the family home in Valpolicella. After the expiry of the sentence, after a further period of probation and the obligation to sign in Negrar, on 24 November 2016, the competent surveillance magistrate revoked the latter provision, giving Abel freedom. When interviewed by the Corriere del Veneto, Abel said that he was ready to make further unpublished statements and testimonies on his criminal experiences.

Both criminals claimed that they no longer were in contact with each other.

On 28 October 2024, it was announced that Abel had died on 25 October, at the Ospedale Sacro Cuore Don Calabria in Negrar di Valpolicella. He was 65. Abel had suffered a fall at home in 2021 and never recovered from his injuries.

== Victims ==
- Guerrino Spinelli, murdered on 25 August 1977 in Verona
- Luciano Stefanato, murdered on 17 December 1978 in Padua
- Claudio Costa, murdered on 12 December 1979 in Venice
- Alice Maria Beretta, murdered on 20 December 1980 in Vicenza
- Luca Martinotti, murdered on 25 May 1981 in Verona
- Father Gabriele Pigato and Father Giuseppe Lovato, both murdered on 20 July 1982 in Vicenza
- Don Armando Bison, murdered on 26 February 1983 in Trento
- Livio Ceresoli, Giorgio Fronza, Ernesto Mauri, Pasquale Esposito, Elio Molteni and Domenico La Sala, murdered on 14 May 1983 in Milan
- Corinne Tartarotti, murdered on 8 January 1984 in Munich

== See also ==
- Years of Lead
- List of serial killers by country
- List of serial killers by number of victims

== Bibliography ==
- Lane, Brian; Gregg, Wilfred (1995) [First published 1992]. The Encyclopedia of Serial Killers. New York City: Berkley Book. pp. 27–29. ISBN 0-425-15213-8 – via Internet Archive.
- Guerra, Nicola (2022). "Ludwig: a revolt against the modern world. The language and ideology of an Italian Neo-Nazi group in the Years of Lead". Behavioral Sciences of Terrorism and Political Aggression: 1–22. doi:10.1080/19434472.2022.2118348. S2CID 253005999.
- Mastronardi, Vincenzo Maria; De Luca, Ruben (2013). I Serial Killer (in italian). Italy: Newton Compton. p. 4.6.4. ISBN 978-88-541-6216-7.
- Carlo Lucarelli and Massimo Picozzi. La Nera, Mondadori, 2006
- Monica Zornetta (2011). Ludwig: Stories of Fire, Blood and Madness (in Italian). Baldini Castoldi Dalai. ISBN 978-886620257-8.
