= Guinean Market Women's Revolt =

Series of large protests and riots in Guinea

Market Women's Revolt or Women's Revolt
- Date: 27 August 1977
- Location: Began at Madina Market, Conarky - Spread throughout the country
- Caused by: Government set prices so low that women vendors couldn't make a living
- Goals: Government economic reform
- Methods: demonstrations; rioting
- Result: Relaxation of policies on private trade and the improvement of Guinea's relations with France.

Parties
Women vendors	Ahmed Sékou Touré's regime

Lead figures
	President Ahmed Sékou Touré

Casualties
- Death: Some local governors were killed

The Market Women's Revolt of 1977 was a series of large demonstrations and riots across Guinea brought about by the ban of private trade for goods sold in the country's public markets.

The riots began on 27 August 1977 when women vendors in Conakry's Madina Market began rioting against the "economic police," who were responsible for enforcing the government's price controls and were often corrupt. The riots spread throughout the country and led to several deaths.

The revolt is seen as a major turning point in the history of Guinea and the end of President Ahmed Sékou Touré's most radical economic reforms. 27 August became a public holiday following the end of President Ahmed Sékou Touré's regime although it was suspended by Lansana Conté's government in 2006, shortly before an uprising sparked by the price of rice took place.
