= National Library of Guinea =

National library

Guinea National Library
- Location: Conakry, Guinea
- Established: 1958

Collection
- Size: Over 40,000 volumes (prior to 1986)

Other information
- Director: Dr Cheick Sylla Baba

The Guinea National Library (Bibliothèque Nationale de Guinée) is the national library of Guinea, located in the capital city of Conakry.

The National Library was created the same year the country gained its independence: 1958. At that time, however, it was simply the renamed branch library in Conakry of the Institut Français d’Afrique Noire. It did not receive much government support, but "by 1961 it had a trained librarian (the only one in the country), new and trainable personnel, and money appropriated by the government." By the end of 1967, its resources included 11,000 volumes and 300 current periodicals, plus whatever it had obtained from "transfers, purchases, and gifts." The following year saw a move to a smaller and older building, but in a more central location, and a new French-trained Guinean librarian. However, both trained librarians were promoted and transferred elsewhere, and the budget dwindled. Finally, in 1985, the library had to get by on donations alone.

In 1986, the library was shut down, one of the victims of governmental economy measures that also saw the dismissal of 45,000 civil servants. Around this time, the collection contained over 40,000, perhaps an estimated 60,000, volumes, but they were scattered around wherever there was storage space, including the basement of the Palais du Peuple and buildings belonging to the now defunct Imprimérie Patrice Lumumba, Guinea's premier printing press. Most of the staff sought employment elsewhere.

Dr Cheick Sylla Baba has been the Director General of the National Library since 1998. He has fought for the library in the face of decades of government indifference. The library currently has its own building in the museum complex in the Sandervalia quarter of Conakry. In March 2015, the first stone was laid for a new building to house the library near the Gamal Abdel Nasser University of Conakry.

In its collection is a complete set of 159 vinyl recordings of the Syliphone record label, which was set up by Guinea to support the Music of Guinea and its native artists.

According to the United Nations, as of 2014 approximately 32 percent of adult Guineans can read.

== See also ==
- List of national libraries
- National Archives of Guinea

== Bibliography ==
- Marcel Lajeunesse, ed. (2008). "Guinée". Les Bibliothèques nationales de la francophonie (PDF) (in French) (3rd ed.). Bibliothèque et Archives nationales du Québec. OCLC 401164333.
- "Guinea", World Report 2010, The Hague: International Federation of Library Associations, OCLC 225182140, archived from the original on 2019-06-29, "Freedom of access to information" (Includes information about the national library)
