= List of companies of Guinea =

Location of Guinea (in dark blue)

Guinea, officially the Republic of Guinea, is a country in West Africa. Formerly known as French Guinea, it is today sometimes called Guinea-Conakry to distinguish it from its neighbor Guinea-Bissau and the Republic of Equatorial Guinea. Guinea has abundant natural resources including 25 percent or more of the world's known bauxite reserves. Guinea also has diamonds, gold, and other metals.

== Notable firms ==
This list includes notable companies with primary headquarters located in the country. The industry and sector follow the Industry Classification Benchmark taxonomy. Organizations which have ceased operations are included and noted as defunct.

Notable companies Status: P=Private, S=State; A=Active, D=Defunct
| Name | Industry | Sector | Headquarters | Founded | Notes | Status | |
|---|---|---|---|---|---|---|---|
| Air Guinee Express | Consumer services | Airlines | Conakry | 1992 | Defunct airline | P | D |
| Air Guinee International | Consumer services | Airlines | Conakry | 2010 | Never started, defunct 2010 | P | D |
| Air Guinée | Consumer services | Airlines | Conakry | 1960 | Airline, defunct 2002 | P | D |
| Alumina Company of Guinea | Basic materials | General mining | Fria | ? | Bauxite mining | P | A |
| Compagnie des Bauxites de Guinée | Basic materials | Aluminium | Boké | 1962 | Bauxite Mining | P | A |
| Compagnie des bauxites de Kindia | Basic materials | Aluminium | Conakry/Kamsar | 2001 | Bauxite Mining | P | A |
| Eagle Air | Consumer services | Airlines | Conakry | 2006 | Airline | P | A |
| Guinee Air Service | Consumer services | Airlines | Conakry | 1985 | Airline | P | A |
| Halco Mining | Basic materials | Aluminium | Boké | 1962 | Aluminium | P | A |
| Office de la poste guinéenne | Industrials | Delivery services | Conakry | ? | Postal services | P | A |
| Société minière de Boké | Basic materials | Aluminium | Boké | 2014 | Bauxite Mining | P | A |
| Union des Transports Africains de Guinée | Consumer services | Airlines | Conakry | 2001 | Airline, defunct 2004 | P | D |

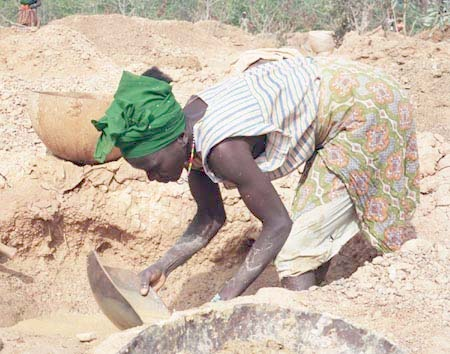
Gold mining in Siguiri, Guinea

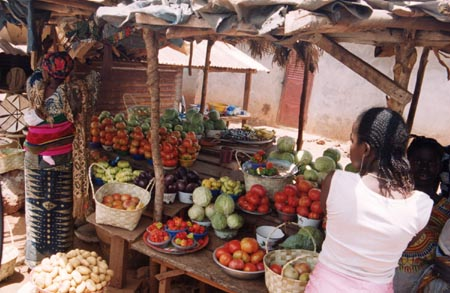
A market stall selling vegetables in Dinguiraye Prefecture.

== See also ==
- Economy of Guinea
- List of banks in Guinea
