= Rail transport in Guinea =

1000 mm gauge tracks 1435 mm gauge tracks

Guinea has 1,155km of railways. This comprises 366km at 1,435 mm (4 ft 8 1/2 in) gauge and 789km at 1,000 mm (3 ft 3 3/8 in) gauge. The latter includes 662km in common carrier service from Kankan to Conakry most of which is abandoned.

== The current status ==
=== Conakry to Kankan (state owned railway line) ===
In June 1959, the state-owned railway company ONCFG (Office National des Chemins de Fer de Guinée) was founded. The property of the former French colonial Conakry-Niger rail authority was transferred to it. Since 2010 the organisation has been known as Société Nationale des Chemins de Fer de Guinée (SNCFG).

In the following years, the rolling stock was not maintained. Since 1993, with the exception of fuel shipments to Mamou, rail traffic was suspended.

In 2008, the government of Guinea was in talks with Rio Tinto and BHP Billiton about the renovation of the Conakry-Kankan line.

In 2011, the Brazilian company Vale began rebuilding the Conakry to Kankan railroad. This project was not completed and the majority of the line remains abandoned as of 2025.

=== Passenger Services ===
A major public transport development milestone was achieved in Guinea during June 2010 with the start of the Conakry Express. This operates on the SBK standard gauge line (see below). The Chinese International Funding (CIF) funded initiative has delivered a passenger rail transport system, The Conakry Express will hugely improve the movement of people through the 30 km (19 mi) long route.

A passenger service operates (2018 latest information) between Kamsar and Sangaredi three times per week on the Chemin de Fer de Boké standard gauge line (see below).

=== Mining company lines ===
A number of railway lines are used to transport bauxite and iron ore to the coast for export:

- Chemin de Fer de Boké. This 136 km (85 mi) long standard gauge railway line from Kamsar to Boké and Sangarédi commenced operation in 1973. The route is operated by the CBG mining company but also carries the traffic of Guinea Aluminium Company (GAC) and Compagnie des Bauxites de Dian-Dian (COBAD). CBG transports 12,000,000 t (11,800,000 long tons; 13,200,000 short tons) of bauxite and minerals annually.
- Dapilon Santou Railway. This 125km (78mi) long standard gauge line was opened in 2021. It is operated by the SMB-Winning Consortium.
- Chemin de fer de Conakry – Fria. This 143km (89mi) long 1,000mm narrow gauge railway line was opened in 1963. The first 16km is shared with the Conakry - Kankan line. The route is operated by the Russian aluminum giant RusAl (in 2006 acquired from Friguia SA). Between Fria and Conakry transported more than 900,000 t (886,000 long tons; 992,000 short tons) of goods (600,000 t or 591,000 long tons or 661,000 short tons aluminate, 200,000 t or 197,000 long tons or 220,000 short tons petroleum products and 100,000 t or 98,400 long tons or 110,000 short tons caustic soda).
- Societe des Bauxites de Kindia (SBK). This 105km (65mi) standard gauge line from Conakry to Kindia commenced operation in 1972 and was built with help from USSR. The route is operated by mining company Societé des Bauxites de Kindia (SBK). The transport included the delivery of bauxite (annually 1,200,000 t or 1,180,000 long tons or 1,320,000 short tons) from Kindia to Conakry harbour.
- Transguinean Railway. This 625km standard gauge line is currently (2025) under construction and will transport iron ore from the Simandou mine to the coast, near Matakong, for export. The project is being developed by a consortium comprising Winning Consortium Simandou (WCS), Rio Tinto (in partnership with others) and the government of Guinea.

== Proposed rail links with other countries ==
=== To Liberia ===
In February 2024 the latest proposal to construct a line from the south-east of Guinea into Liberia was announced. The 'Liberty Corridor' would see a heavy-haul railway constructed from the Lola region of Guinea to a new deep-water port at Didia in Liberia. "The government of Liberia has signed a letter of intent with High Power Exploration (HPX) and Guma Africa Group to enter into negotiations over the joint development of the Liberty Corridor connecting Guinea and Liberia."

=== To Mali ===
In May 2024 the latest proposal to rehabilitate / replace the Conakry to Kankan line, with an extension on to Mali was announced. "On 15th May 2024, the Guinean Ministry of Transport, the Guinean Ministry of Economy and Finance, and construction company ICE Home Development signed a framework agreement to continue the studies for the reconstruction of the 1,400 km railway line from Conakry via Kankan to the border with Mali."

== See also ==
- Railway stations in Guinea
- Transport in Guinea
