= Naigaya =

- Location in Guinea
- Coordinates: 09°57′24″N 12°17′05″W
- Country: Guinea
- Prefecture: Faranah Prefecture
- Elevation: 1,506 ft (459 m)

Naigaya is a village in southwest Guinea. It is near the border with Sierra Leone. Its elevation 411.0 metres (1,348.4 ft). It is in the Prefecture of Kindia.

== Transport ==
Naigaya is near a proposed railway to a new port at Matakong for iron-ore traffic from mines at Kalia and elsewhere.

Naigaya has an elevation of about 400 m with surrounding mountains up to 800 m, and the railway requires up to 21 km of costly tunnelling. An easier route, avoiding these tunnels, with gentler gradients, would have to cross into Sierra Leone, needing an exclave, which is problematic.

== See also ==
- Railway stations in Guinea.
