= Madina Woula =

- Location in Guinea
- Coordinates: 09°53′00″N 12°27′00″W
- Country: Guinea
- Region: Kindia Region
- Elevation: 256 ft (78 m)

Madina Woula (also spelled Madina Oula) is a town in southern Guinea near the border with Sierra Leone.

== Transport ==
It is a likely station on the proposed Transguinean Railways.

== See also ==
- Transport in Guinea
- Railway stations in Guinea
