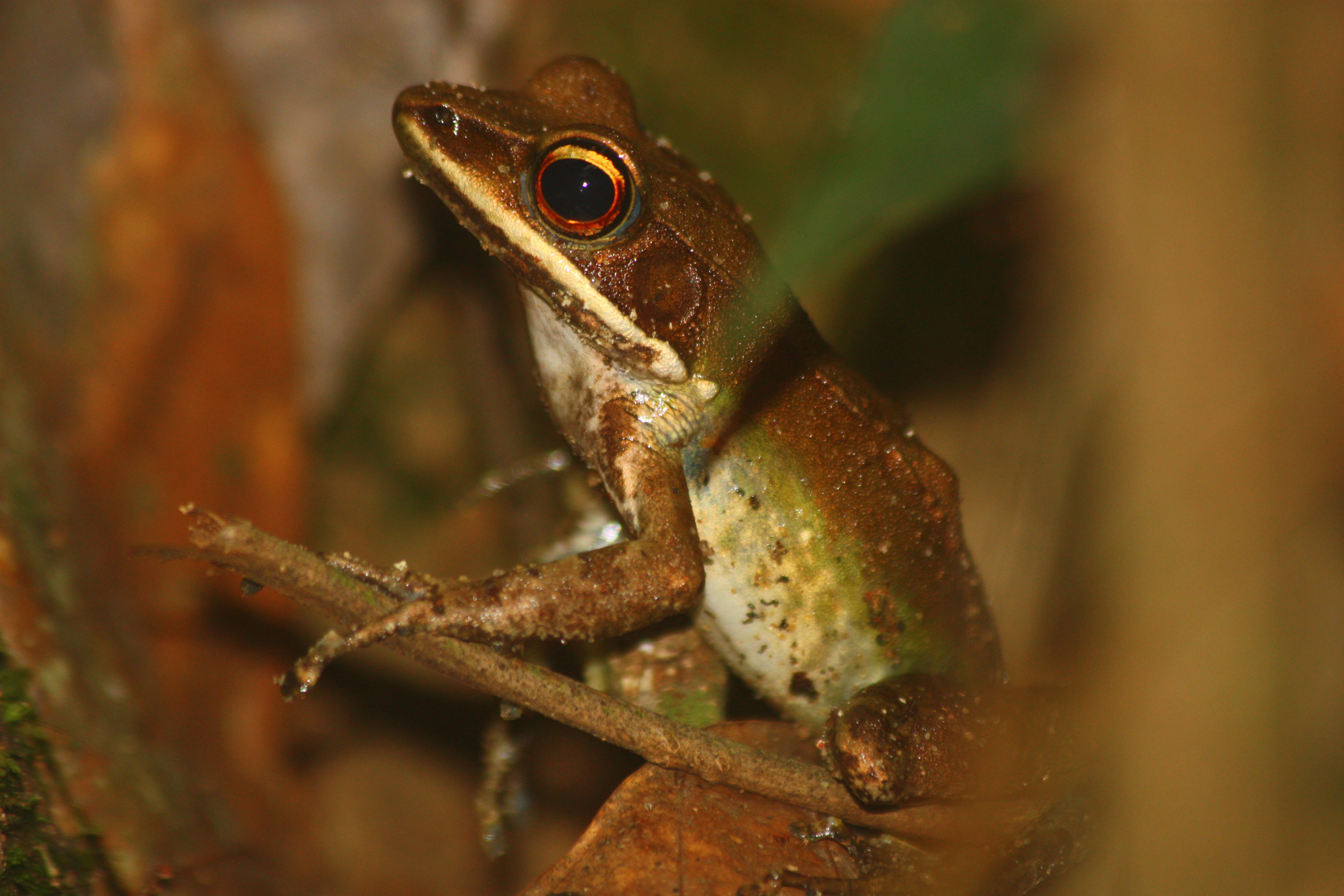

Conservation status
- Least Concern (IUCN 3.1)

Scientific classification
- Kingdom: Animalia
- Phylum: Chordata
- Class: Amphibia
- Order: Anura
- Family: Ranidae
- Genus: Amnirana
- Species: A. albolabris

Binomial name
- Amnirana albolabris (Hallowell, 1856)

Synonyms
- Hyla albolabris Hallowell, 1856; Hylarana albolabris (Hallowell, 1856); Limnodytes albolabris (Hallowell, 1856); Rana albolabris (Hallowell, 1856); Hylarana acutirostris longipes Perret, 1960; Hylarana longipes (Perret, 1960); Amnirana longipes (Perret, 1960)

= Amnirana albolabris =

Species of amphibian

Amnirana albolabris is a species of frog in the family Ranidae. It is widely distributed in Sub-Saharan West and Middle Africa. However, the nominal species includes at least one undescribed species west of Benin; the formal taxonomic changes to split the species have not yet been done. Common names white-lipped frog and forest white-lipped frog has been coined for it, whereas Bamileke Plateau frog refers to now-synonymized Amnirana longipes (=Hylarana longipes).

== Distribution ==
Amnirana albolabris occurs in West Africa (from west to east: Guinea, Sierra Leone, Liberia, Ivory Coast, Ghana, Togo, Nigeria) and in Middle Africa (from north to south and east: Cameroon, Central African Republic, Equatorial Guinea, Gabon, Republic of the Congo, Angola, Democratic Republic of the Congo, Uganda, Tanzania, Rwanda, Burundi, and Kenya). There seems to be a gap in the distribution between western Togo and western Nigeria.

== Phylogeny and taxonomy ==
Amnirana albolabris includes two very distinct lineages. The western component includes most of the West African populations and is the sister taxon of Amnirana fonensis. The Central African component also includes the Nigerian populations and is the sister taxon of Amnirana asperrima. The type locality of Amnirana albolabris is given as "West Africa", but later researchers have deduced that the correct locality is Gabon. The name Amnirana albolabris therefore refers to the Central African component. However, molecular data suggest that Amnirana longipes (Perret, 1960) is embedded within the Central African Amnirana albolabris and the former should therefore considered junior synonym of the latter.

== Description ==
Adult females measure 61–74 mm (2.4–2.9 in) in snout–vent length. The snout is slightly rounded and the eyes are prominent. The tympanum is visible. The fingers have no webbing but the toes are webbed.

== Habitat and conservation ==
Amnirana albolabris is found in secondary habitats and heavily degraded former forest in the forest zone as well as in gallery forests in the humid savanna zone. While in West Africa, it occurs in closed-canopy forest and in secondary habitats, it avoids closed forest in central Africa. Individuals are usually found low in the vegetation. West African populations breed in large temporary ponds and in permanent streams, while the central African ones breed in still-water ponds, marshes, raphia swamps and creeks.

It is a very common and adaptable species that is unlikely to suffer from other than localized threats. It occurs in many protected areas.
