= List of banks in Guinea =

This is a list of commercial banks in Guinea, as updated in March 2023 by the Central Bank of Guinea.

== List of commercial banks ==
- AFG Bank
- Access Bank Guinea, part of Access Bank Group
- Afriland First Bank Guinea, part of Afriland First Bank Group
- Banque pour le Commerce et l'Industrie de la Guinée (BCI Guinée), part of BCI Group
- Banque Islamique de Guinée (BIG), part of Tanweel Africa Group
- Banque Nationale de Guinée (BNG)
- Banque Populaire Maroco-Guinéenne (BPMG), part of BCP Group
- Banque Sahélo-Saharienne pour l'Investissement et le Commerce (BSIC), part of BSIC Group
- Coris Bank Guinea, part of Coris Bank Group
- Diama Bank
- Ecobank Guinée, part of Ecobank Group
- FBNBank, part of First Bank of Nigeria Group
- NSIA Kaloum
- Orabank Guinea, part of Orabank Group
- SPCI Bank
- Skye Bank Guinée, part of Polaris Bank Group
- Société Générale Guinée, by end-2024 undergoing acquisition from Société Générale by Atlantic Financial Group
- United Bank for Africa Guinea, part of UBA Group
- Vista Bank Guinée, part of Vista Bank Group
- Vista Gui (formerly Banque Internationale pour le Commerce et l'Industrie de la Guinée), also part of Vista Bank Group

== See also ==
- Economy of Guinea
- List of companies based in Guinea
- List of banks in Africa
