= Sangarédi Airport =

Airport in Guinea

Sangarédi Airport Aéroport de Sangarédi (French)
- IATA: none; ICAO: GUSA

Summary
- Airport type: Public
- Serves: Sangarédi
- Elevation AMSL: 686 ft / 209 m
- Coordinates: 11°06′55″N 13°48′55″W

Map
- Location of the airport in Guinea

Runways
Direction	Length		Surface
Direction	m	ft	Surface
04/22	1,150	3,773	Dirt
- Source: Google Maps GCM

Sangarédi Airport (ICAO: GUSA) is an airport serving Sangarédi in Guinea. The airport is 12 kilometres (7.5 mi) northeast of the city.

The runway length includes a 270 metres (890 ft) overrun at the north end.

== See also ==
- Transport in Guinea
- List of airports in Guinea
