= Didia (disambiguation) =

Didia may refer to:

- Didia, High Priest of Ptah during the reign of Ramesses II
- Didia (moth), a genus of moth
- Didia, Liberia, a proposed port near Buchanan
- DiDia 150, Bobby Darin's "Dream Car"
