= Kawass Airport =

Airport in Boké, Guinea

Kawass Airport Aéroport de Kawass (French)
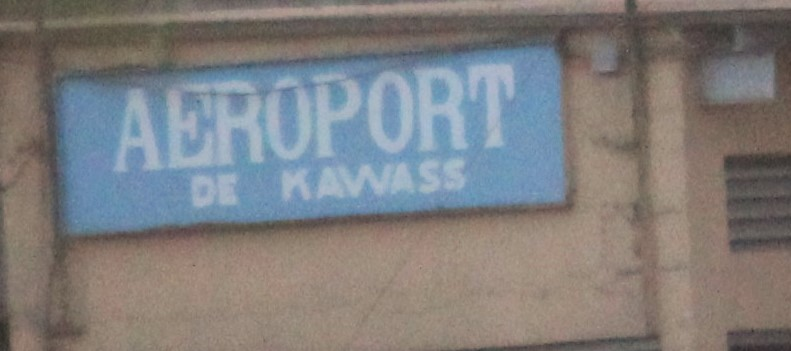

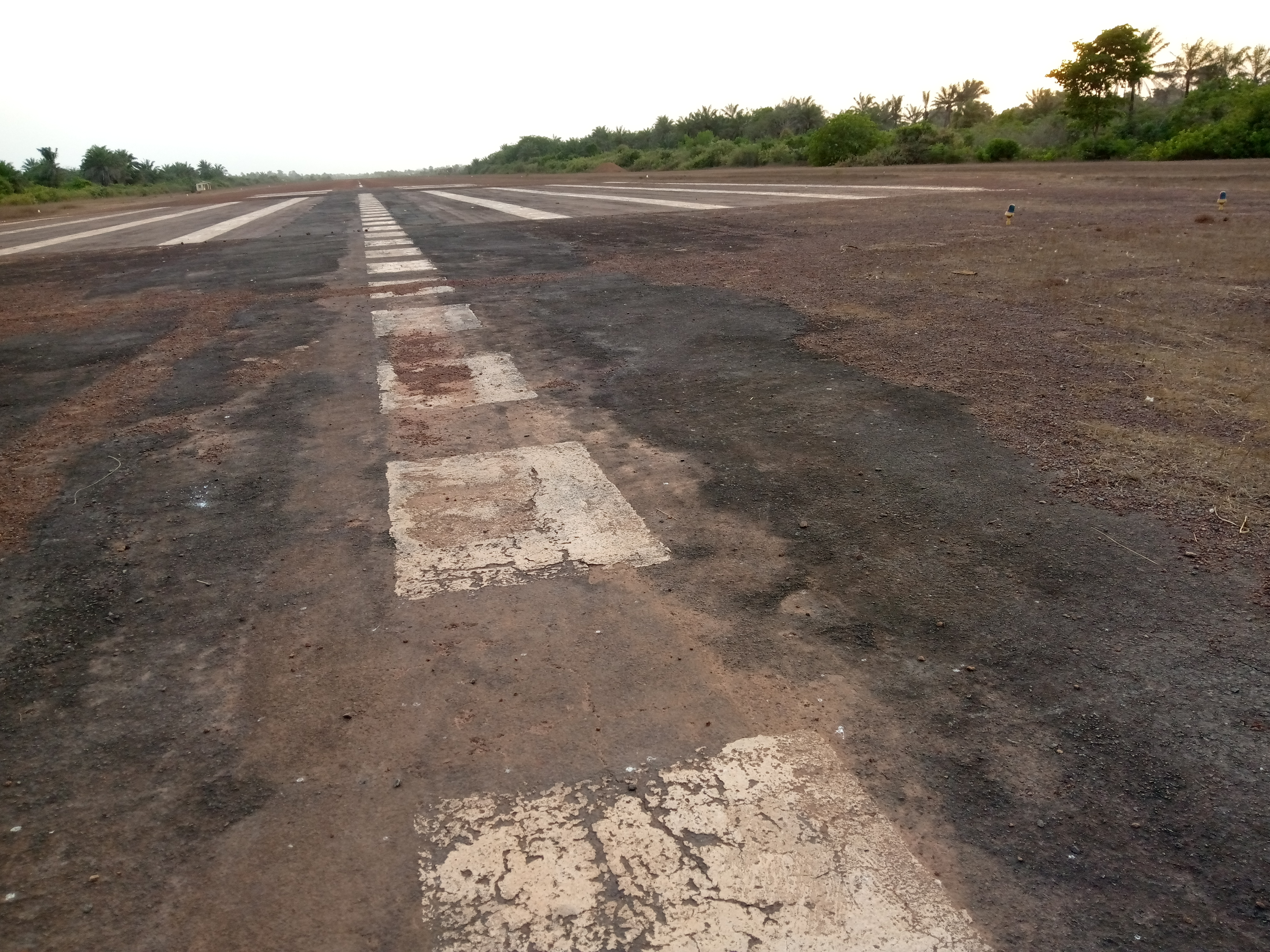
- IATA: none; ICAO: GUKR

Summary
- Airport type: Public
- Serves: Port Kamsar, Guinea
- Elevation AMSL: 36 ft (11 m)
- Coordinates: 10°39′25″N 14°32′00″W

Map
- Location of the airport in Guinea

Runways
Direction	Length		Surface
Direction	m	ft	Surface
07/25	1,560	5,118	Asphalt
- Source: GCM Google Maps

Kawass Airport (ICAO: GUKR) is an airport serving Port Kamsar on the Atlantic coast of Guinea. The airport is 7 kilometres (4.3 mi) inland from the city.

The Kamsar non-directional beacon (Ident: KAM) is 4.4 nautical miles (8.1 km) west of the airport.

== See also ==
- Transport in Guinea
- List of airports in Guinea
