= Bambafouga =

- Location in Guinea
- Coordinates: 10°11′00″N 11°51′00″W
- Country: Guinea
- Region: Mamou Region
- Elevation: 745 ft (227 m)

Bambafouga is a town in mid southern Guinea.

== Transport ==
It is a proposed junction on the future standard gauge Transguinean Railways.
