= Didia, Liberia =

Village in Grand Bassa County, Liberia

Coordinates: 05°42′35″N 09°52′18″W

Didia is a town in Liberia on the coast of the Atlantic Ocean. It lies about 30 km to the southeast of the town of Buchanan.

== Transport ==
Didia is the proposed site of a new port for the export of iron ore from Simandou and Zogota in Guinea. A standard gauge railway is proposed to connect this port with iron ore mines across the border in Guinea.

The mine, railway and port are being developed by SMFG

The mining area is described here

== See also ==
- Iron ore in Africa
- Railway stations in Liberia
- Railway stations in Guinea - cross-border
