= Rail transport in Liberia =

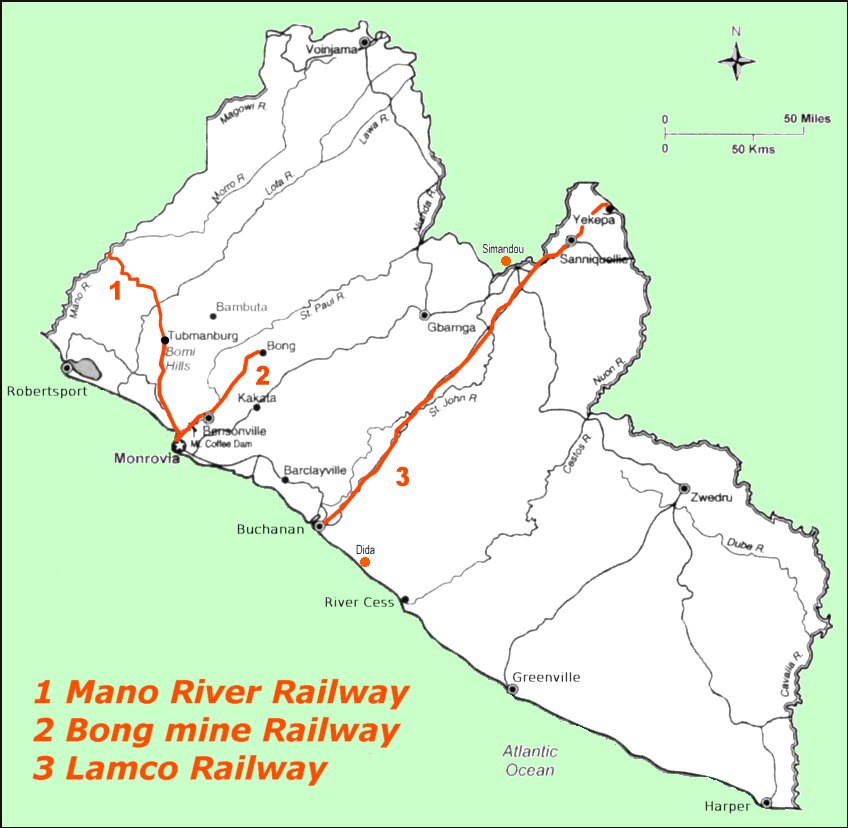
Railway lines of Liberia 1N - 1,067 mm (3 ft 6 in) gauge 2C - 1,435 mm (4 ft 8 1/2 in) gauge 3S - 1,435 mm (4 ft 8 1/2 in) gauge

Railways in Liberia comprised two lines into the interior of the country from the port of Monrovia in the northwest, and one line from the port of Buchanan in the centre. The lines were built between 1951 and 1964 principally to transport iron ore. All three lines closed down, two due to the effects of the two Liberian Civil Wars (1989–1996 and 1999–2003). The Bong Mine Railway recommenced operations in 2003. The Lamco Railway was rebuilt by ArcelorMittal and put back into service in 2011 as far as Tokadeh, Nimba County, allowing export of iron ore from the company's mine on the Guinean border via the Port of Buchanan.

== Infrastructure ==
=== Mano River Railway (1N) ===
The 1,067 mm (3 ft 6 in) gauge Mano River railway primarily carried freight, but had very limited passenger service between Monrovia, Mano River terminal, Brewerville, Klay, Tubmanburg and Mano River Mine. These are now disused, due to exhaustion of the iron ore deposits on the line.

=== Bong mine railway (2C) ===
The Bong Mine railway was damaged during the civil war and reopened in 2003 by 2007 or 2009. It had intermittent service to the following places:

- (Liberia) Monrovia Port and capital city.
- Louisiana
- Sheshe
- Harrisburg
- Careysburg
- Kolata
- Motobli
- Yapagua
- Bong Mine

This railway is 1,435 mm (4 ft 8 1/2 in) standard gauge.

=== Lamco Railway (3S) ===
The Lamco railway was originally built to take iron ore from Mount Nimba - Yekepa Train station, near the Guinean border, and Tokadeh to the port of Buchanan, for export. It fell into disuse and was damaged during the civil war, but was rebuilt by ArcelorMittal from Tokadeh to the coast and returned to service in 2011. This railway is 1,435 mm (4 ft 8 1/2 in) standard gauge.

==== Proposals ====
- In 2010, BSG Resources planned to build a cross-border line to export iron ore from mines near Simandou North (in Guinea) via the Liberian port of Didia. 51% of BSGR is now owned by Vale. This line parallels the Lamco Railway for a considerable distance.
- In 2022 a short extension across the border into Guinea to serve iron ore deposits there was proposed. This is being promoted by High Power Exploration which has an agreement with the Guinean government to develop the Nimba Iron Ore Project. Its Liberian subsidiary Ivanhoe Liberia intends to agree shared access to the railway line between Buchanan and Tokadeh, rebuild a line from there to Yekepa abandoned in 1992 and build a new line 2–3 km from Yekepa to the border. This would join a short section of new railway within Guinea to reach the mine.

== Accidents ==
In January 2006, there was an accident on the Bong Mines railway; a train travelling from the mine to Monrovia collided with a makeshift wooden trolley used by locals (known as a "Make-away"). Two were killed.

== Maps ==
- UN Map

== See also ==
- Transport in Liberia
- Transport in Guinea just across the border.
- List of rail gauges
