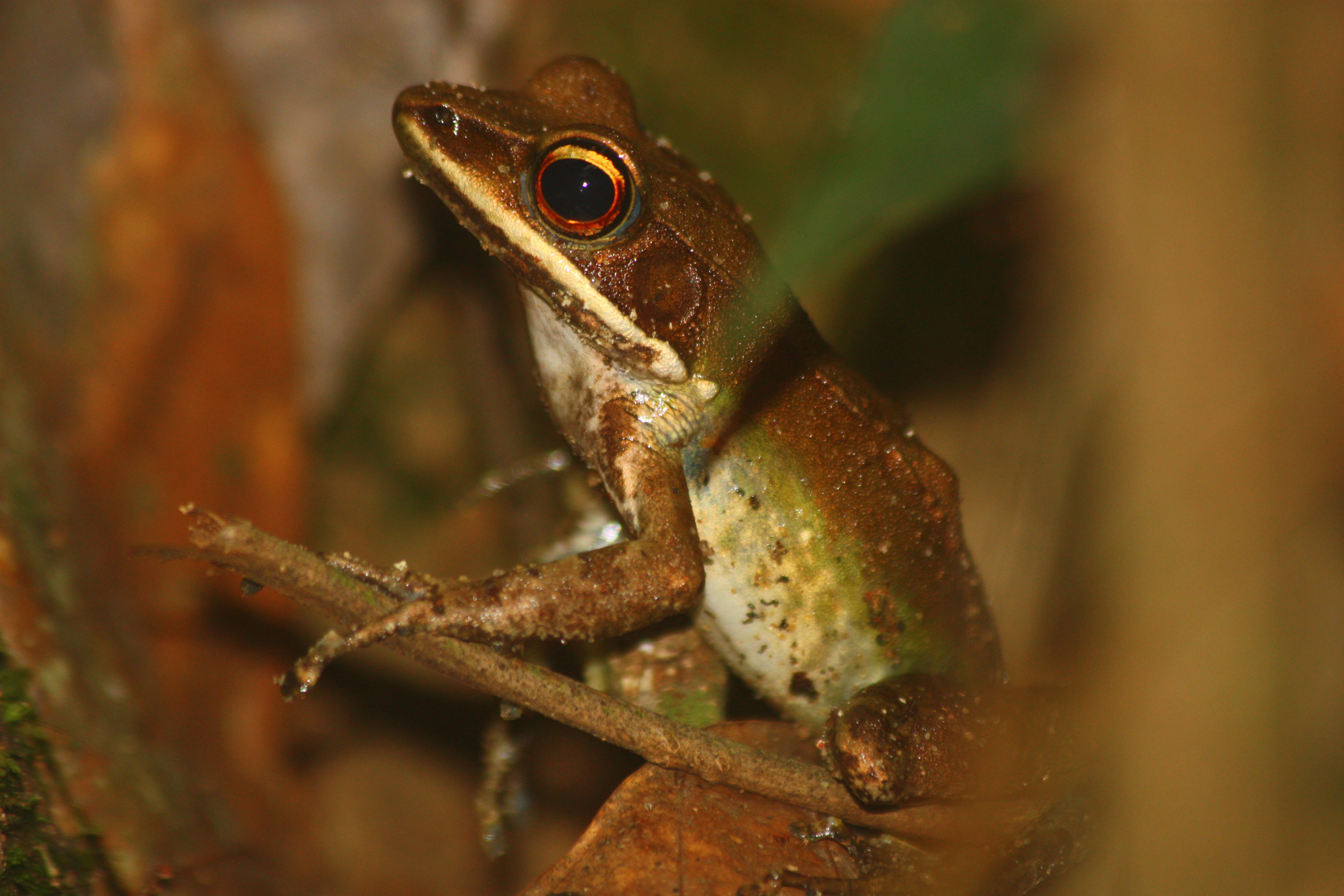
- Amnirana albolabris

Scientific classification
- Kingdom: Animalia
- Phylum: Chordata
- Class: Amphibia
- Order: Anura
- Family: Ranidae
- Genus: Amnirana; Dubois, 1992

Type species
- Rana amnicola Perret, 1977

Species
- 11 species (but see text)

= Amnirana =

Genus of amphibians

Amnirana is a genus of frogs in the family Ranidae, "true frogs". The genus is primarily found in Sub-Saharan Africa, but one species occurs in parts of southern and southeastern Asia. Some of the African species are widespread but contain undescribed cryptic diversity. Most (but not all) species have a white upper lip, and the genus is sometimes known as the white-lipped frogs.

== Taxonomy ==
Amnirana was originally introduced as a subgenus of Rana. It was often included in the then-diverse genus Hylarana, until Oliver and colleagues revised the genus in 2015, delimiting Hylarana more narrowly and elevating Amnirana to genus rank. Within the genus, Amnirana nicobariensis appears to be the sister taxon of the African clade of species, but the data are inconclusive. With more data available to resolve possible non-molecular synapomorphies of the genus, A. nicobariensis might become recognized as a separate genus. A later study suggested it to be closer to other Asian Hylarana sensu lato than to African Amnirana.

== Description ==
The current delimitation of Amnirana is primarily based on molecular evidence in combination with geography. No morphological diagnosis is available, and the genus shows variability in characteristics that have been suggested to have diagnostic value within the genus Hylarana sensu lato. The body is robust and medium to very large in size. The dorsum is smooth to shagreened in texture and uniform to mottled in pattern. The upper lip is usually white, but it is dark in Amnirana lepus. Males have paired vocal sac, which may be internal or protrude externally.

== Species ==
There are 12 recognized species:

- Amnirana albolabris (Hallowell, 1856)
- Amnirana amnicola (Perret, 1977)
- Amnirana asperrima (Perret, 1977)
- Amnirana darlingi (Boulenger, 1902)
- Amnirana fonensis Rödel and Bangoura, 2004
- Amnirana galamensis (Duméril and Bibron, 1841)
- Amnirana lemairei (De Witte, 1921)
- Amnirana lepus (Andersson, 1903)
- Amnirana nicobariensis (Stoliczka, 1870)
- Amnirana occidentalis (Perret, 1960)
- Amnirana parkeriana (Mertens, 1938)
- Amnirana parva Griesbaum et al., 2023

In addition, the AmphibiaWeb recognizes Amnirana longipes as a valid species, whereas the Amphibian Species of the World, following Jongsma and colleagues, considers it synonym of Amnirana albolabris. Nevertheless, the "true" species number is likely to be substantially higher, with molecular data suggesting at least seven new African species.
