= Mehla =

Village in Nimba county, Liberia

- Location in Liberia
- Coordinates: 6°49′3″N 8°58′40″W
- Country: Liberia
- County: Nimba County
- Climate: Am

Mehla is a town in central Liberia. It lies at an elevation of 252 m.

== Transport ==
It is located near the iron ore railway from Nimba to the port of Buchanan.

== See also ==
- Railway stations in Liberia
