= Mifergui =

Human settlement in Guinea

Mifergui is a locality in southeastern Guinea near the borders of Liberia and Côte d'Ivoire.

It is the site of yet to be exploited iron ore deposits.

== See also ==
- Railway stations in Guinea
