= Amnirana parkeriana =

Conservation status
- Data Deficient (IUCN 3.1)

Scientific classification
- Kingdom: Animalia
- Phylum: Chordata
- Class: Amphibia
- Order: Anura
- Family: Ranidae
- Genus: Amnirana
- Species: A. parkeriana

Binomial name
- Amnirana parkeriana (Mertens, 1938)

Synonyms
- Hylarana parkeriana (Mertens, 1938)

Species of amphibian

Amnirana parkeriana, commonly known as Congolo frog, or Parker's white-lipped frog, is a species of frog in the family Ranidae. It is endemic to Angola.

Its natural habitats are subtropical or tropical moist lowland forests and swamps.
