= Kalia, Gaoual =

Coordinates: 11°36′00″N 12°58′00″W

Kalia is a town in the West African country of Guinea. It lies north of the capital Conakry, in Gaoual Prefecture, the main town of which is Gaoual. Its elevation is 615 meters. There is a town with the same name at Kalia, Faranah, Guinea.
