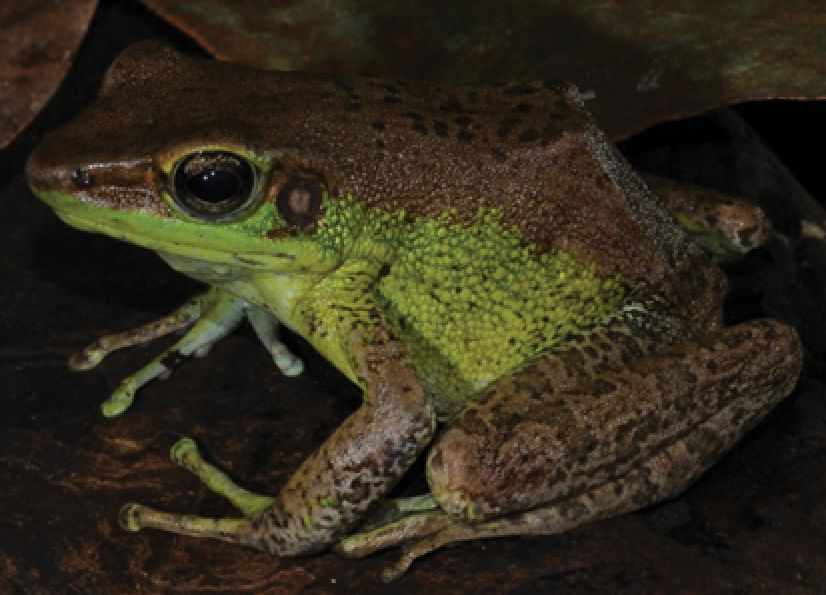
- Female Amnirana lepus from Angola

Conservation status
- Least Concern (IUCN 3.1)

Scientific classification
- Kingdom: Animalia
- Phylum: Chordata
- Class: Amphibia
- Order: Anura
- Family: Ranidae
- Genus: Amnirana
- Species: A. lepus

Binomial name
- Amnirana lepus (Andersson, 1903)

Synonyms
- Chiromantis lepus Andersson, 1903; Rana lepus (Andersson, 1903); Amnirana lepus (Andersson, 1903); Hydrophylax lepus (Andersson, 1903); Hylarana lepus (Andersson, 1903); Rana zenkeri Nieden, 1908; Hylorana zenkeri (Nieden, 1908)

= Amnirana lepus =

Species of frog

Amnirana lepus is a species of frog in the family Ranidae. It is found in Cameroon, Equatorial Guinea, Gabon, Central African Republic, Republic of the Congo, Democratic Republic of the Congo, and northern Angola. Common names Andersson's Cameroon frog, Andersson's white-lipped frog, and jumping white-lipped frog have been proposed for it.

== Description ==
Males grow to a snout–vent length of 70 mm (2.8 in) and females to 100 mm (3.9 in). The body is elongated and the snout is moderately pointed, rounded in lateral view. The tympanum is relatively large. The legs are slender and long. The toes are fully webbed. The finger and the toe tips bear discs. The upper surfaces are dark to bronze-brown, possibly with darker spots. The flanks turn to pale green in their lower part and have some dark patterning. The venter is pale green. Males do not have an external vocal sac, but they do have short oval glands in their upper arms and nuptial pads on the thumbs. The male advertisement call is a quiet, high-frequency, unobtrusive "ouic, ouic", with some deep chuckles in between and ending with a "hik".

== Habitat and conservation ==
Amnirana lepus is a lowland forest species that also can occur in gallery forests and heavily degraded former forests (farm bush). It is often found along the banks of large, slow-flowing streams and small rivers, its breeding habitat. It is a common and adaptable species that is not facing any significant threats. Furthermore, it is present in a number of protected areas.
