= Sougeta =

Town in Guinea

Coordinates: 10°09′N 12°32′W

- Town
- Location in Guinea
- Country: Guinea
- Region: Kindia Region

Sougeta is a small town in the Kindia Region of western Guinea, located 50 kilometers northeast of the regional capital Kindia.

Primary industries in Sougeta include limestone extraction on the outskirts of Sougeta, supporting cement production through local deposits. A major project, the Sougeta Integrated Cement Plant, is under development, involving clinker production and grinding units, which provides employment and contributes to the local economy.

== Transport ==
It is served by a station of the Guinea Railways networks.

== See also ==
- Railway stations in Guinea
