= Kalia, Faranah =

- Location in Guinea
- Coordinates: 10°11′0″N 11°14′0″W
- Country: Guinea
- Prefecture: Faranah Prefecture
- Elevation: 1,909 ft (582 m)

Kalia is one of two towns in Guinea with this name. This is the one in Faranah Prefecture. It is east of the capital Conakry near Faranah and near to the border with Sierra Leone.

== Namesake ==
The namesake town in Kalia, Gaoual, Guinea.

== Mining ==
There are iron ore deposits nearby. The exploration company is Bellzone.

The port would be at Matakong.

A heavy duty standard gauge common user railway, shared with amongst others the Simandou (South) mine and Faranah mines, would be built. The loaded trains will weigh about 20,000 t and there will also be fuel and container trains.

== See also ==
- Iron ore in Africa
- Railway stations in Guinea
