= Transguinean Railways =

Proposed heavy duty standard gauge railways in Guinea

The Transguinean Railways is a proposed set of heavy haul standard gauge railways in Guinea to support haulage of primarily iron ore and bauxite.

== Overview ==
Existing railways in Guinea are badly maintained and feeble, and would need to be rebuilt from the ground up to support a tenfold or hundredfold increase in tonneages. The new lines would also avoid undesirable rises and falls through hilly terrain.

== Gauge ==
The new lines would be standard gauge (1435mm) so as to benefit most from off the shelf equipment, and to achieve the highest secondhand value of surplus equipment. The existence of successful heavy duty narrow gauge lines in South Africa, Queensland and Brazil would not affect this choice.

== Dapilon Santou Railway (North Trans-Guinean Railway) ==
This 135 km (84 mi) long Standard Gauge railway was officially opened in June 2021. It connects new mining areas at Santou II and Houda with a new river port at Dapilon near Yakabya, around 25 km (16 mi) west of Boké. The line is operated by the SMB-Winning Consortium and is intended to carry predominantly bauxite. Dapilon port has been criticised for the effects of bauxite dust causing environmental damage to fields, cashew plantations and nearby settlements.

== Transguinean Railway (South Trans-Guinean Railway) ==
This 622 km (386 mi) long dual-track railway, mooted to be operational by 2025, will connect the iron ore mines around Simandou (south-eastern Guinea) with a proposed new river port at Morebaya. Shallow waters require a 20 km (12 mi) long pier to reach deep water suitable for Panamax sized ships. A later phase may see a deepwater port at Matakong on a coastal island between the capital of Conakry and the Sierra Leone border. The total cost of this project, including mine, port and railway, etc., is estimated at US$17 billion. The project is being developed by a consortium comprising Winning Consortium Simandou (WCS), Rio Tinto (in partnership with others) and the government of Guinea.

A description of the project, including map, funding and future ownership arrangements is provided on the WCS website and in a Rio Tinto press release.

=== Borders ===
The planned new line roughly parallels Guinea's southern border with Sierra Leone and Liberia. Regions served will be Kindia, Mamou, Faranah and Nzérékoré.

== See also ==
- Transport in Guinea
- Railway stations in Guinea
- Rail transport in Guinea
