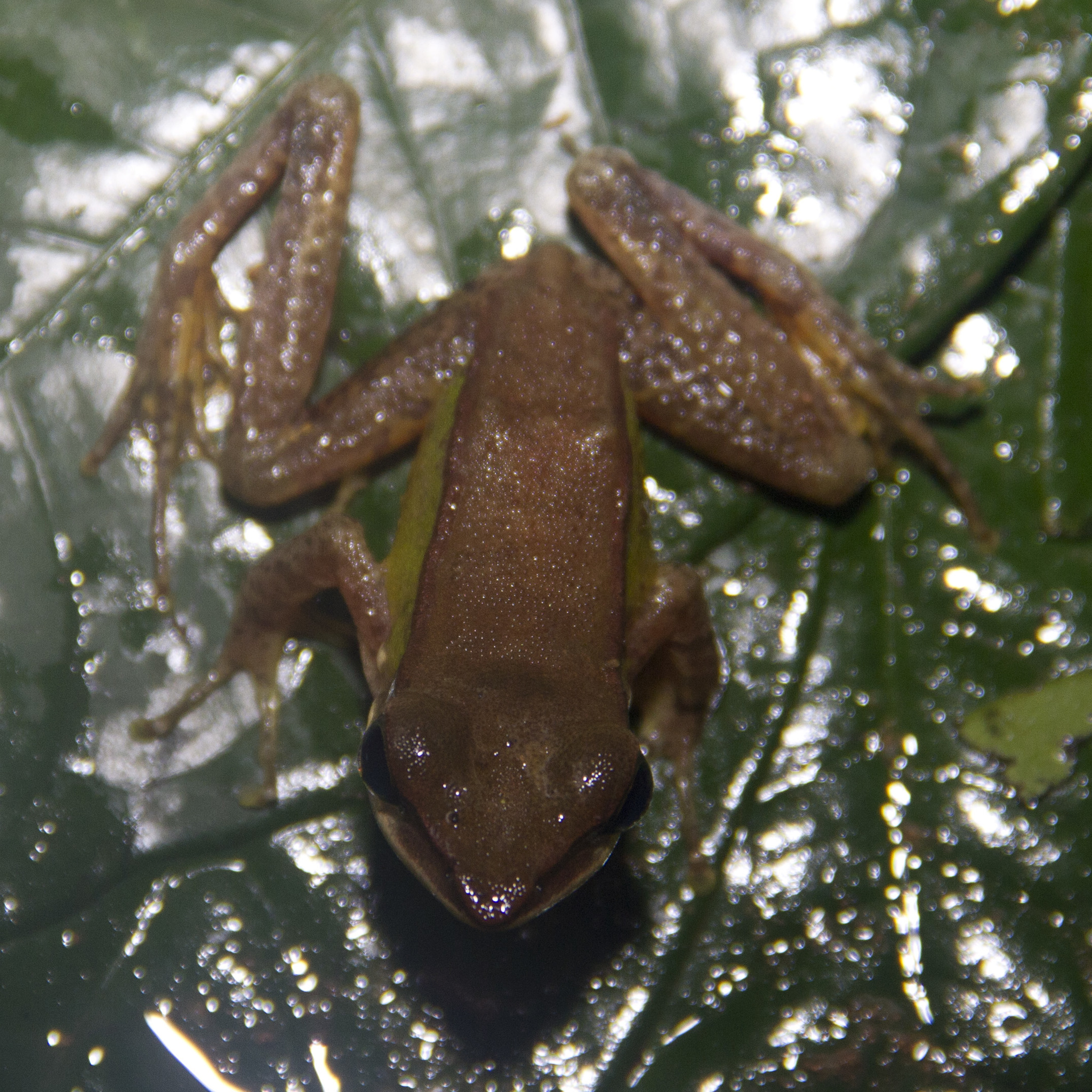

Conservation status
- Least Concern (IUCN 3.1)

Scientific classification
- Kingdom: Animalia
- Phylum: Chordata
- Class: Amphibia
- Order: Anura
- Family: Ranidae
- Genus: Amnirana
- Species: A. amnicola

Binomial name
- Amnirana amnicola (Perret, 1977)

Synonyms
- Hylarana amnicola Perret, 1977

= Amnirana amnicola =

Species of frog

Amnirana amnicola is a species of frog in the family Ranidae. It is found in Cameroon, Equatorial Guinea, Gabon, and possibly Republic of the Congo. Its natural habitats are subtropical or tropical moist lowland forests and rivers. It is threatened by habitat loss.
