= Halco Mining =

Halco Mining is an aluminium company based at Pittsburgh, Pennsylvania (USA). The company is organized under the laws of the state of Delaware in the United States. Halco is the owner of 51% of the stock of Compagnie des Bauxites de Guinée (CBG), the government of Guinea owns 49% and this has been the case since CBG was founded.

The consortium was established in 1962 by Harvey Aluminium Company to mine bauxite deposits in the Boké region. Halco/CBG owns the rights to mine bauxite in a 10,000 square kilometer area of northwestern Guinea under a seventy five year lease through the year 2038.

== Related organizations ==
Halco's stock is owned by the following companies:

- Alcoa – 45%
- Rio Tinto Group – 45%
- Dadco Investments Limited – 10%

On 25 January 1967 Alcoa announced that it had purchased a 17.5% stake from Harvey Aluminum.

Prior to September 1968 Harvey owned 51%.

Reynolds in 1984 acquired 6% from Martin Marietta, which had taken over Harvey Aluminum. Commonwealth Aluminium was created on 8 January 1985 in the process of Comalco taking over 8% in Halco from Martin Marietta, among other assets.

On 30 June 2004, Dadco Alumina & Chemicals Ltd acquired the remaining 50% stake of Hydro Aluminium Deutschland GmbH (part of the Norsk Hydro Group) in the Aluminiumoxid Stade GmbH and then owned 100% of AOS. At the same time Dadco acquired the 10% stake in Halco from HAD.

Company	ca. end of 1967	from Sep 1968	at July 1992
(United States) Harvey Aluminum	51	20	
(United States) Alcoa	17.5	27	27
(Canada) Alcan	17.5	27	27
(France) Pechiney	6	10	10
(Germany) Vereinigte Aluminiumwerke	5	10	10
(Italy) Montecatini^{1968} Aluminia SpA	3	6	6
(Australia) Commonwealth Aluminium Co			8
(Netherlands) Billiton			6
(United States) Reynolds			6

== Harvey Aluminum ==
Harvey Machine announced on 26 September 1955 that construction of a 108 million pounds per year aluminum smelter in The Dalles, Oregon will commence early in 1956 and be completed at the end of 1957. Power was furnished by the Bonneville Power Administration.

The Harvey Machine Co., Inc changed its name to Harvey Aluminum on 10 January 1958. The company had factories in Torrance, California, The Dalles, Oregon, Salem, Oregon and Milan, Tennessee.

== See also ==
- Aluminium in Africa
- Aluminium in Guinea
- Gite
