= Kouyeya =

Town in Guinea

Coordinates: 10°05′N 12°41′W

Kouyeya is a small town in eastern Guinea in Coyah Prefecture near the Sombouya Valley. As of 1989, it had a population of 884.
