= Guinee Air Service =

Airline of Guinea

IATA	ICAO	Call sign
—	GIS	GASS
- Commenced operations: 1985
- Operating bases: Conakry International Airport
- Fleet size: See Fleet below
- Headquarters: Conakry, Guinea
- Key people: Ibrahima Kouyate (former President)

Guinee Air Service was an airline based in Conakry, Guinea. It was established and started operations in 1985 and operated domestic charter flights. Its main base was Conakry International Airport.

== Fleet ==
As of March 2007, the Guinee Air Service fleet included:

- 2 Antonov An-26
