= Compagnie des bauxites de Kindia =

Mining company in Guinea

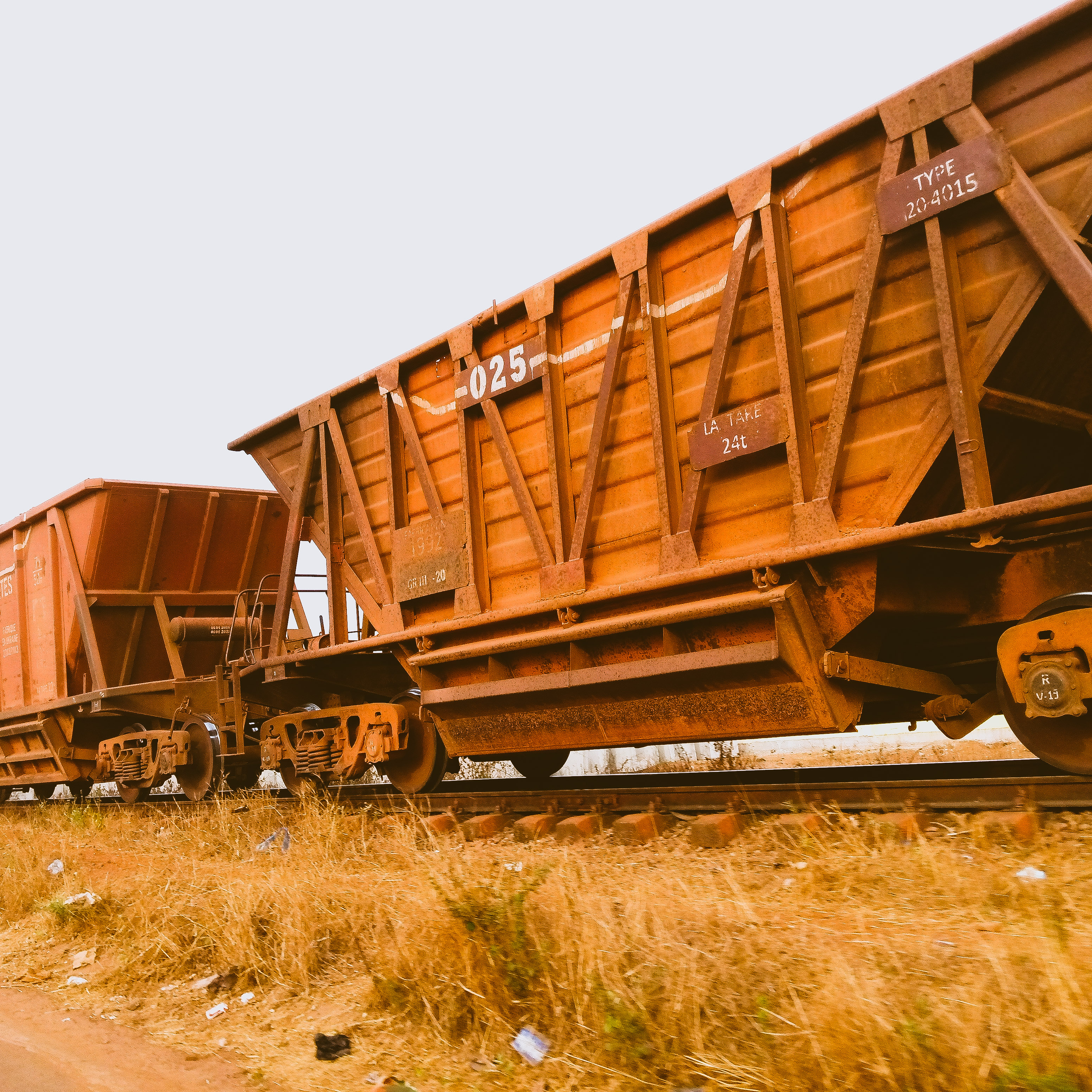
- Company type: Société anonyme
- Industry: mining, logistics
- Predecessor: Office des Bauxites de Kindia
- Founded: 2001
- Headquarters: BP 523 Conakry, BP 100 Kamsar; Guinea
- Products: Bauxite
- Number of employees: 200

Compagnie des bauxites de Kindia (CBK) is a Guinean company in the mining sector. Since 2001, it has mined the large Kindia Bauxite deposit in Kindia, in Guinea.

Guinea is the fifth largest producer of bauxite in the world, but the country possesses the largest ore reserves. Estimates are as high as 25 billion tons, or the majority of the world's reserves.

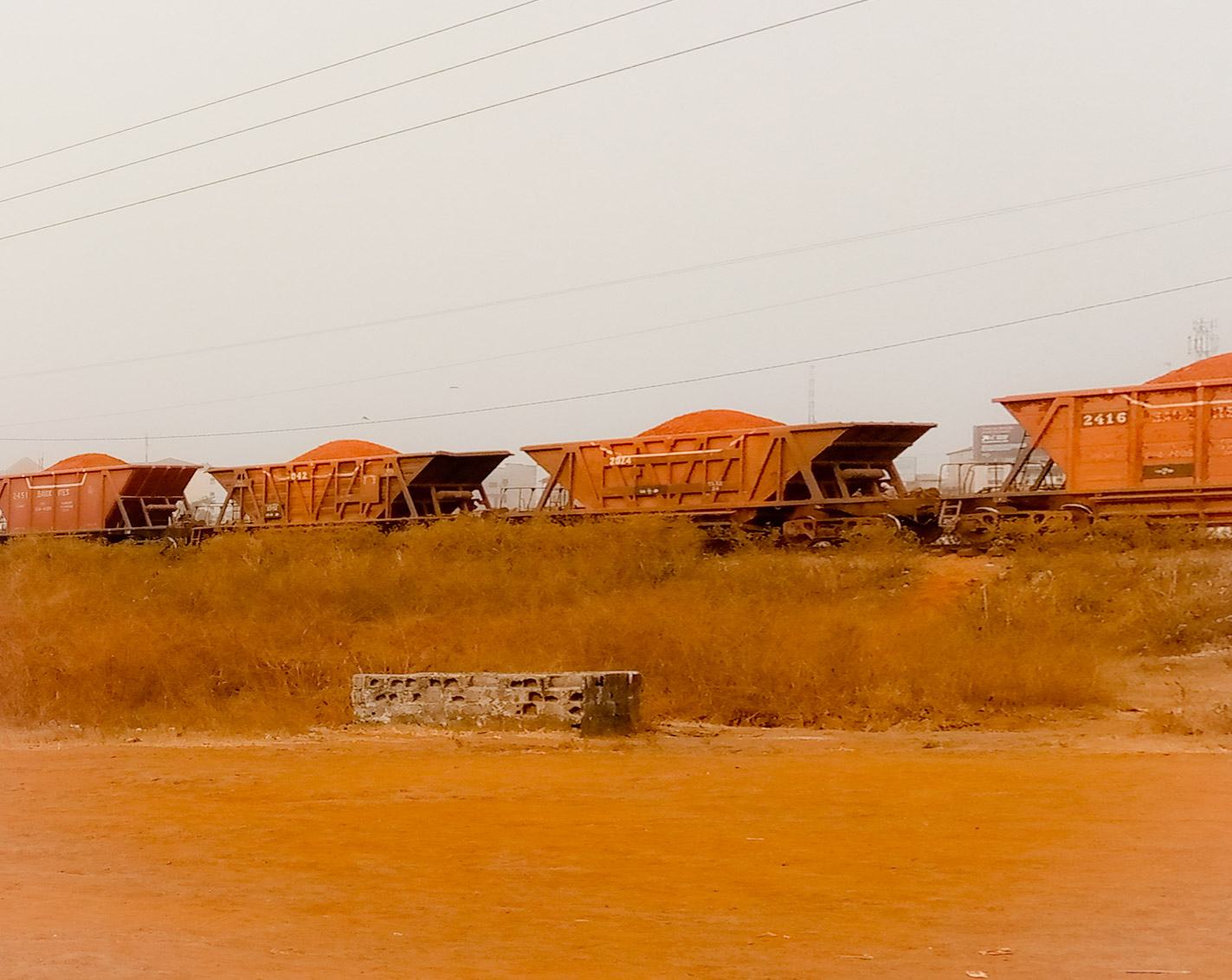
Train Cars of CBK.

, The company has an annual production capacity of 3.5 million tons. They operate open-air mining pits and use two primary extraction methods: drilling and blasting technology, and thin-layer production using Wirtgen 2200SM mining machines

== History ==
CBK was founded as a wholly state-owned enterprise, but was later transformed into a limited liability corporation, Société des Bauxites de Kindia. In 2001, SBK was transferred to the Russian mining giant RUSAL (Russki Alumina), for a 25 year term, and has since been operating as CBK. It supplies over 65 percent of its total bauxite output to the Nikolaev alumina refinery in Ukraine whereas the rest is exported to other locations. The company supplies about 25% of RUSALs total bauxite output. RUSAL also owns the Friguia bauxite and aluminum complex through its wholly owned subsidiary Alumina Company of Guinea (ACG) The company, alongside other mining companies in Guinea, has been criticized for human rights violations. There have been several strikes and demonstrations against the company's policies. In 2009, workers protested against inadequate working conditions, poor pay, and worse living conditions compared to employees of other mining companies. and again in 2012, workers protested that they be paid quarterly wages of 120 US Dollars. They showed their support by marching on the companies train tracks, temporarily preventing shipments from reaching the port. The company has also been accosted by NGOs for not paying its fair share of taxes.
