= Compagnie des Bauxites de Guinée =

Guinean mining company

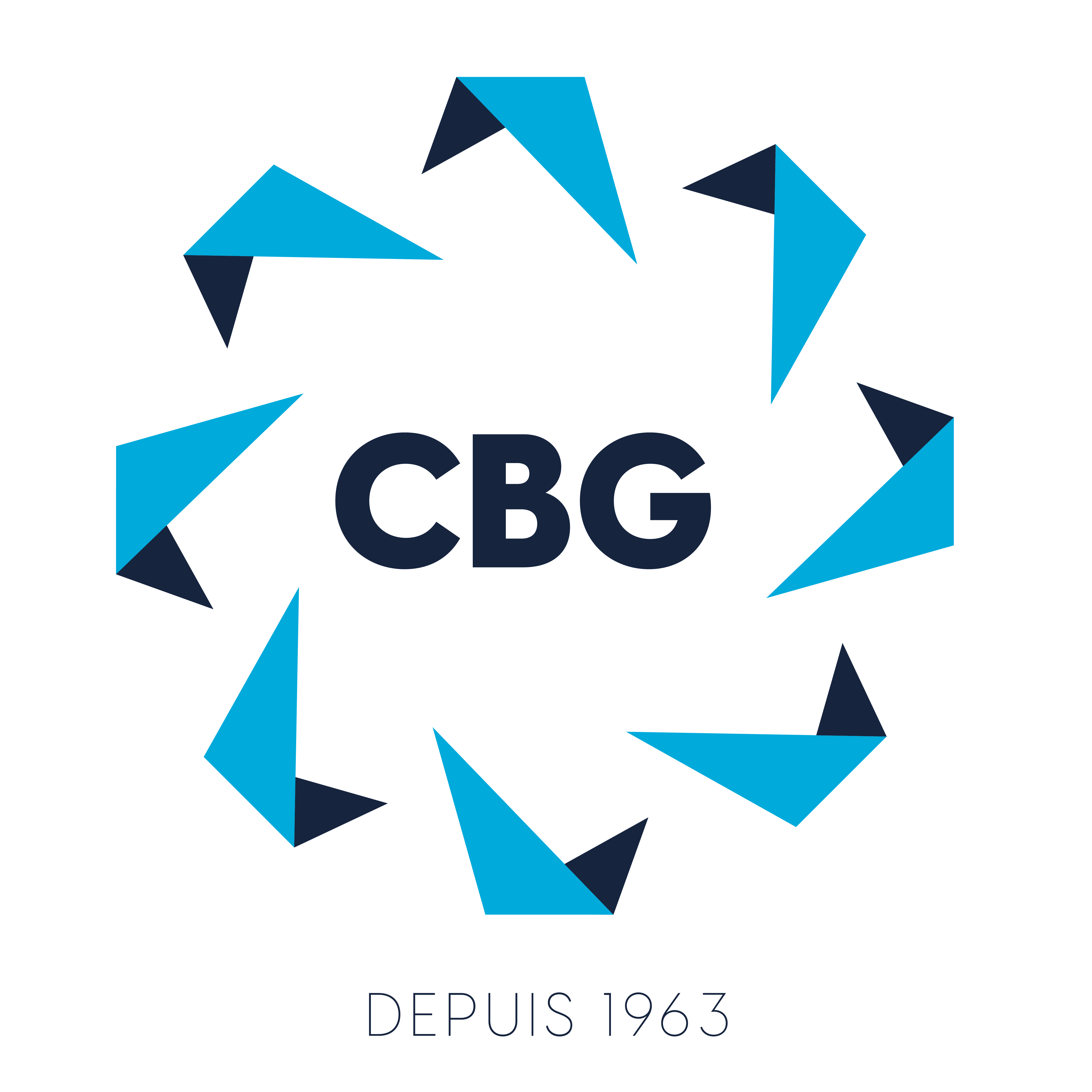
- Type: Société d'Économie Mixte
- Industry: Mining
- Founded: 1963; 63 years ago
- Headquarters: Kamsar, Guinea
- Key people: Karifa Condé (Directeur Général)
- Products: Bauxite
- Owner: Government of Guinea (49%); Halco Mining (51%)
- Number of employees: 2,300 (2026)
- Website: cbg-guinee.com

Compagnie des bauxites de Guinée (CBG) is a Guinean mining company. Since 1963 it has extracted bauxite from the notable mine in Sangarédi, in Boké Region in Guinea. It is 49% owned by the Guinean State, with the remainder owned by the Boké Investment Company, a 100%-owned subsidiary of Halco Mining, a consortium opened in 1962 by Harvey Aluminum Company to run mining operations in Guinea. Halco's stock is owned by Alcoa (45%), Rio Tinto Alcan (45%) and Dadco Investments (10%).

Guinea is the world's 5th largest producer of bauxite, yet the country holds the world's largest reserves of the valuable ore used to produce aluminum. Estimates of the country's reserves rise as high as 25 billion tons, or the majority of the world's bauxite.

== Bauxite mining in Guinea ==
Guinea possesses a third of the best bauxite reserves in the world, or about 20 billion tons, with a high content (45-62 %) of alumina and a low silica content (0.8-2 %). Despite being ranked second after Australia in terms of production, it was, in 1993, the largest exporter in the world, having benefited from the relocation in the world aluminum industry in the 1970s; After global production tripled between 1950 and 1960, it doubled again in the 70s, which saw a strong consolidation around six companies: (Alcan, Alcoa, Reynolds, Kaiser, Pechiney Ugine Kuhlman and Alusuisse) as well as a strong vertical integration, as a result of which, in 1979 the members of the International Association of Bauxite Producing Countries supplied 75% of the world's bauxite, while only providing 4.5% of the world's Aluminum. High-Value added segments in the global aluminum value-chain (E.g. Alumina refining and smelting) have remained mostly in developed countries, meaning that despite Guinea's large ore deposits, most of the money made from that ore goes to the wealthy nations where industrial plants are located.

== History ==
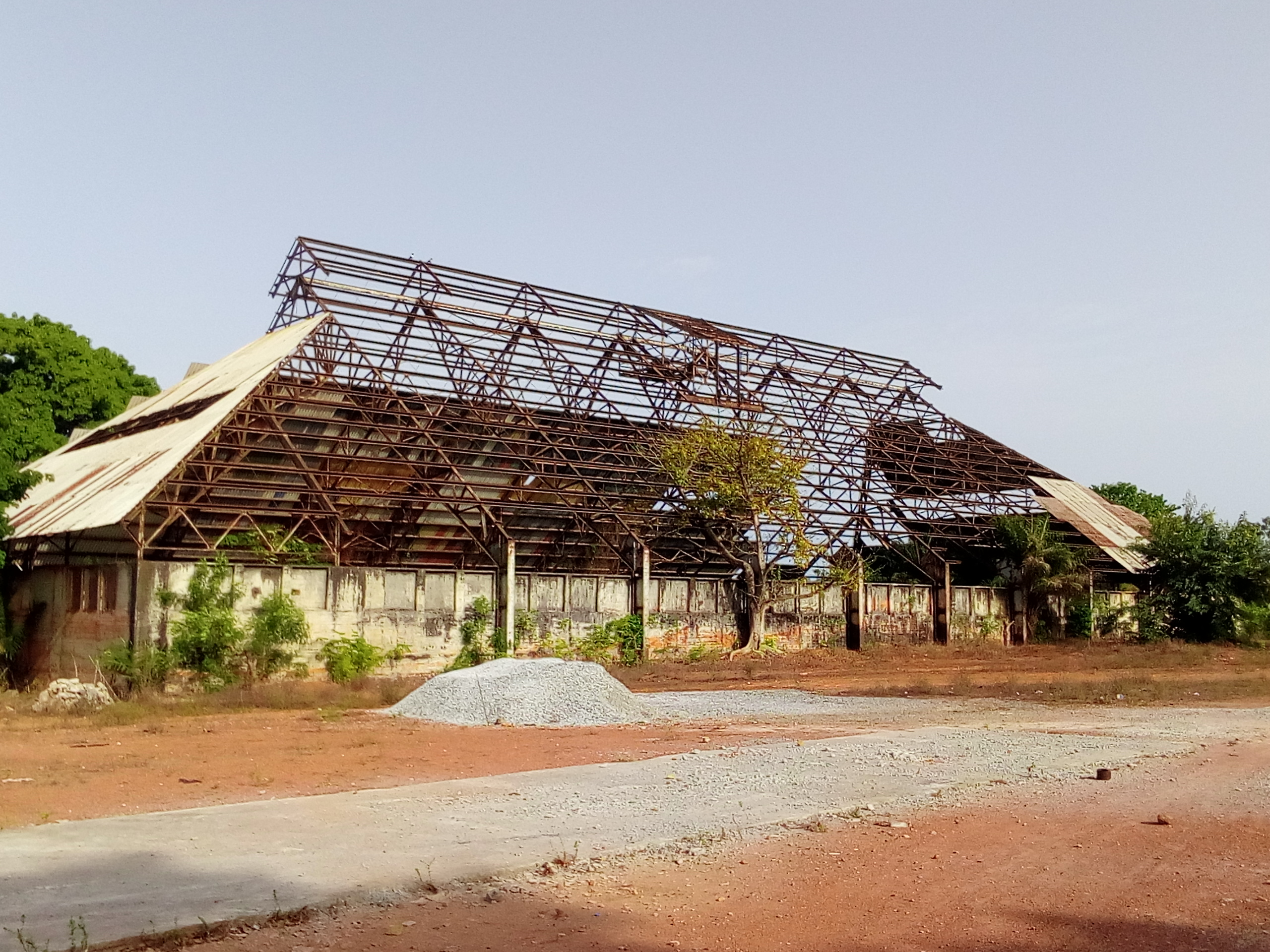
The first plant of Bauxites du Midi in Guinea.

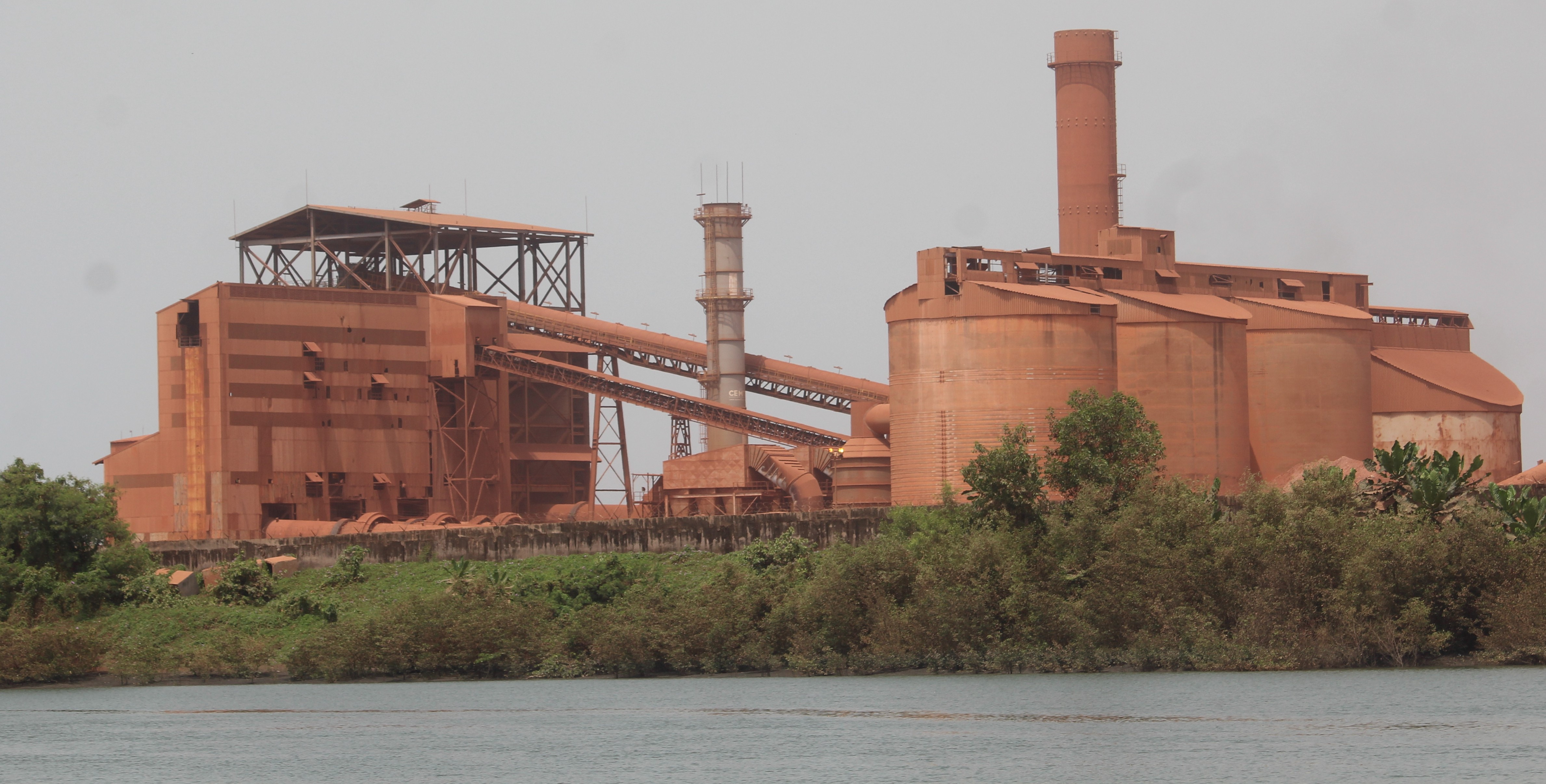
CBG in Kamsar.

Early on, the country attracted prospectors. Bauxites du Midi, founded in 1912 in Paris, began mining operations on Île Tamara in 1937, preceded by a prospecting voyage in 1936-1937 Alcoa transferred the capital stock of Bauxites du Midi to Aluminum Ltd in 1928. Bamidi (incorporated 9 December 1912) was one of 20 companies that were acquired by Aluminium Ltd on 4 June 1928. Bamidi, then still part of Alcoa began operations on bauxite deposits it had acquired in the south of France only after World War I. It was also engaged in development in French West Africa since the early 1920s. The other subsidiary in France was Aluminium Meridional (incorporated 5 February 1926 and also transferred to Aluminium Ltd on 4 June 1928). It operated a plant for the production of aluminum paste (for use in paints) in Bedous.

On July 24, 1948, 20 mining exploration permits were awarded to the company. They discovered that the bauxite deposits of guinea consisted of surface deposits which are entirely exploitable using mining pits and heavy vehicles. Bauxites du Midi partnered with the Canadian company Aluminum Laboratories, which proffered the necessary funds and materials for the deposit facilities in Guinea, and additionally worked to provide the specialists required to construct an enrichment plant on Île de Kassa. In 1948 and 1950 the Guinean bauxite from the Îles de Los was shipped in small quantities to the Aluminum plants of Alcan in Saguenay-Lac-Saint-Jean in Québec, but in November 1966, that deposit was depleted, as was expected, despite nationalization.

Construction was started in 1948 and the total investment was $13 million. Bamidi considered it to be merely a pilot plant. They planned to invest $125 million into the Boke complex, consisting of port facilities at Kamsar, a 84-mile railroad and eventually an alumina refinery. Construction started in 1957, with first bauxite shipments planned for 1963 and alumina production for 1965. One million tons of bauxite were earmarked for export and 500,000 tons per year for the conversion into 220,000tpa of alumina.

Under the leadership of Pierre Jochyms, the planning of the utilization of significant deposits of bauxite (in Kassa, Boké and Fria), Iron ore (on the Kaloum peninsula and the Nimba-Simandou island chain) gold and diamonds was begun. The exceptional hydroelectric potential of the Konkouré watershed had already been identified, and two large dams were being researched (Grandes Chutes and Souapiti)

CBG began its first excavations in January, 1955, then suspended them for one year. Pechiney Ugine began its major project in 1957, on the site of Fria. Studies were done on the hydroelectric project in Konkouré, to the east of Fria, but following a referendum on September 28, 1958, they were kept secret by the colonial authorities.

In November 1961, the government took possession of the sites of Kassa and Boké after Bamidi had said in August that it would not be able to refine bauxite into aluminum locally under the terms of the concession agreement. Work that was done up to this point that later became relevant were bridges and earthworks for the first 65km of railroad from Kamsar and a 120m wharf at Kamsar, which was however turned only into an auxiliary wharf in the 1967 design. In 1960 reserves were known to be only 4-5 million tons at Iles de Loos, while Boke was estimated to contain at least 700 million tons. In 1962, Guinea joined the World Bank and CBG resumed its excavations on October 1, 1963, under the banner of the Compagnie des bauxites de Guinée, of which 49% ownership was held by the state of Guinea, and 51% by Harvey Aluminium of Delaware.

In 1965, the Boké Improvement Office (OFAB - Office d'Aménagement de Boké, an agency of the Republic of Guinea) was created to construct and manage CBG's infrastructures. The government in March 1966 received a $1.7 million 10-year 6% IBRD loan to finance foreign currency requirements for field surveys and detailed design work, contracted to TRACTIONEL of Brussels, for a mining town, a 85-mile railroad and a 2,000 tons per hour port terminal, out of a total of $1.9 million required. Nine months were scheduled for the study to provide substantiated evidence for the economic viability of the project (generate data for a cost estimate).

The project was finally defined for 6 million tons of bauxite per year and in October 1967 appraised to cost $123 million. In November 1970 project scope was increased to 9.2 million tpa with a cost estimate of $165 million. Actual cost of construction was $275 million, the overrun attributed mostly to price increases of resources acquired and exchange rate fluctuations. Halco's shareholders in April 1967 signed an offtake agreement for 5.1 million tpa at an average $7 per ton, with the price allowed to vary depending on ore quality. During the scope expansion, they agreed to take another 3.9 million tpa at $9/ton (first 15 years) and $10/ton (next 5 years).

The government's contribution were the mineral rights, the port (excl. ore loading machinery), the railroad (incl. locomotives and rolling stock for traffic other than ore shipments) and housing at Kamsar. This infrastructure was estimated to cost $79.5 million in the 1967 $123 million appraisal ($61,133,000 in foreign currency and $18,400,000 in local currency itemized in, and with $1.7m for the design and another $2.3m for additional technical and legal services added up to $83.5m total cost to the government cited in the August 1968 appraisal.). The IBRD made available $64.5 million to the government in a (18 September) 1968 loan to finance 100% of the foreign exchange portion of the infrastructure and to roll over the $1.7 million March 1966 loan. In addition, USAID in 1968 loaned $21 million (of which $2 million was a margin above the cost estimate) to finance 100% of the domestic currency part of the government's contribution. During the scope expansion a further $9 million IRBD loan was made to the government (on 25 June) 1971 to finance the upgrades made to all parts of the infrastructure. Halco's contribution was the product offtake, the mine site and the Kamsar processing plant. The 50% expansion of capacity resulted in only a 13% cost increase for the plant and a 20% increase for the infrastructure, owing to spare capacity inherent in the original designs. CBG received a $25 million 6% loan from the Export-Import Bank, repayable over 15 years from 1972 for equipment purchases in the United States. The railroad was completed in November 1972, the first ore left Sangaredi on 26 April 1973. Useful maps can be found in:

CBG was incorporated in Delware in May 1964. The capital stock consisted of 100,000 shares (par $20). 49,000 class A shares were issued to the government in exchange for mining rights, 51,000 class B shares were issued to Halco at par for cash. A and B shares had equal voting rights and each appointed 5 board members, the president was appointed by B shares and cast the deciding vote in a tie. Only B shares received dividends. The government was however entitled to a 65% tax on net profits (after interest, depreciation and reinvestment into equipment upgrades, including all such expenses on infrastructure if they relate to the bauxite business, but before dividends).

Bauxite exports began in 1973. The first ship loaded with Guinean bauxite left the port of Kamsar on August 2, 1973, with 19,000 tons of ore on board. In the 1970s, Africa's portion of global bauxite production tripled.

In 1967, the participation of Harvey Aluminum of Delaware was divided amongst several players in the mining sector: Alcan took 33%, Alcoa 27%, Martin Marietta 14%, Péchiney 10%, and Edison-Montecani 6%. At the end of the 70's, Fria exported more than 600,000 tons of alumina annually, of which a part went to the Pechiney's facilities at Edea in Cameroon, with two large foreign investors: Noranda (Canada) 38.5% and Pechiney Ugine Kuhlman (France) 36.5%.

Simultaneously, the site of Débélé in the region of the Kindia mine was made operational before 1974 after an agreement in November 1969, by a joint project of the Soviet Union and the Guinean government, which established the price of ore and announced that the Guinean state is fully the proprietor of said capital, the Soviet Union having assured the purchase of 90% of the ore. Exports passed from 2 million tons in 1974, to more than 3 million in 1988.

At the Boké site, the quantity of exports shifted from around 5 million tons in 1975 to 11 million in 1990.

In November, 2012, CBG signed a historic agreement with the Mubadala Investment Company to supply the United Arab Emirates with bauxite

In December, 2013, Namory Conde, then regional director of BHP Billiton, was named director-general of CBG

The processing plant of the GAC terminal (10.6505°N 14.5977°W) was built east of the CBG plant (10.6476°N 14.6105°W) in Kamsar.

== Activity ==
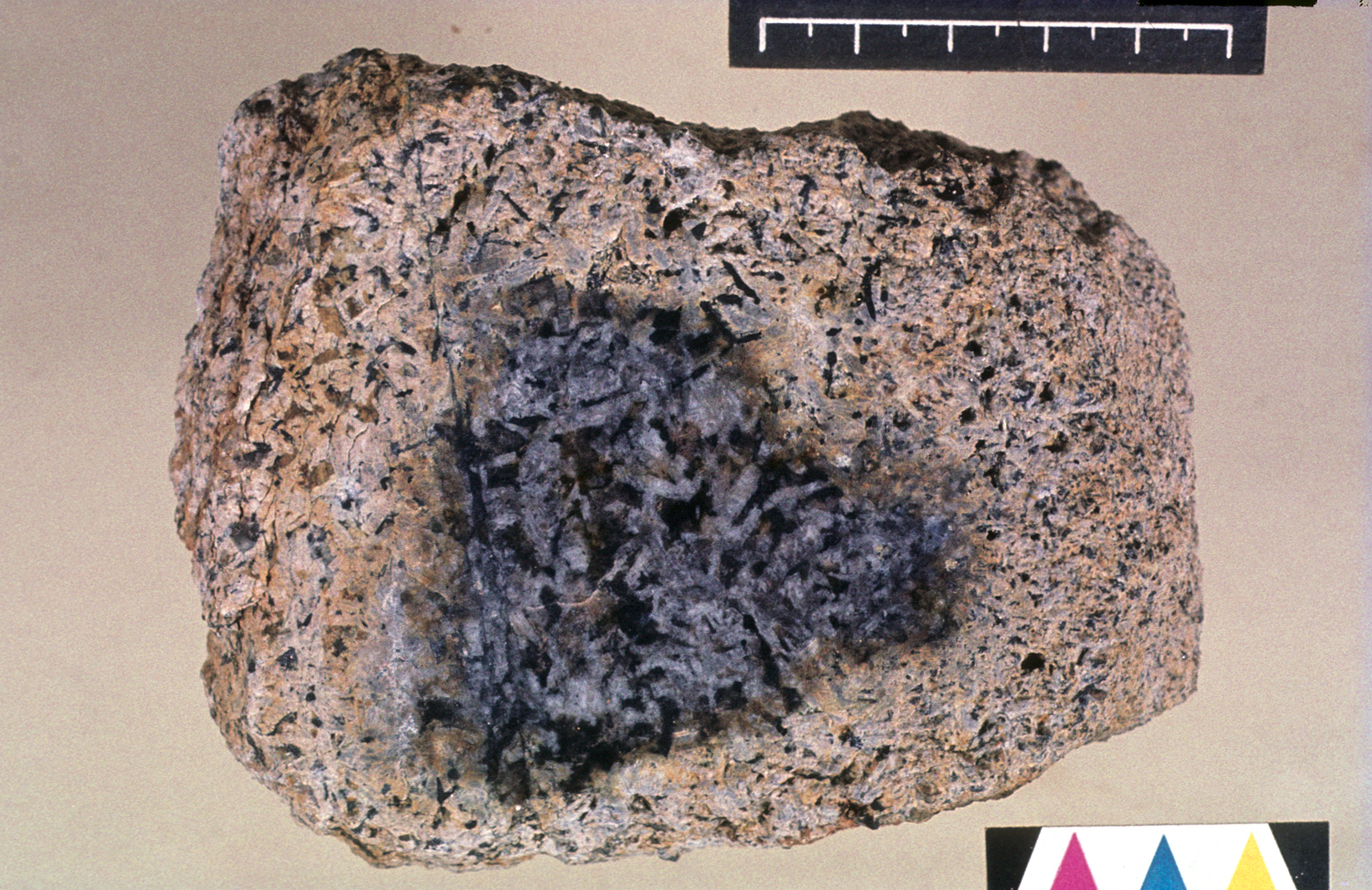
Bauxite in a rock, Kassa, Guinea

The ore, reputed to be of excellent quality due to its 60% alumina content, is transported by rail to the port of Kamsar. The ground of Guinea contains 300 million tons of bauxite, which is enough to ensure production for at least 25 years.

If CBG is vital for the regional and national economy of the nation, it is also accused of being responsible for numerous instances of pollution - toxic dusts and the dumping of fuel oils into the sea - and this, despite an investment of 17 million to reduce dust emissions by 80% in 2005.

CBG exploits the mines of Sangarédi, of Bidikoum, of Silidara, and those of N’Dangara. The bauxite is intended for exportation, principally to North America, Europe and China.

=== Project of Expansion ===
In 2014, CBG undertook a project of expansion. This project would increase the capacity of the company's mining-production, of their rail transport, of their refinery, of their ports, of their electric generating stations and would generate new jobs and increase state-revenue

The Fluor Corporation, project managers, announced the completion of the expansion from 13.5 to 18.5 million tpa on 19 November 2018. Employment was 1,500 at the peak and totaled 4 million man hours. The project was completed on time and on budget. The $501 million contract was awarded in Q2 2016.

Driven by strong demand from China, Guinea's exports jumped 25% in 2025 to 182.8 million tonnes. CBG shipped 17.4 million tonnes.
