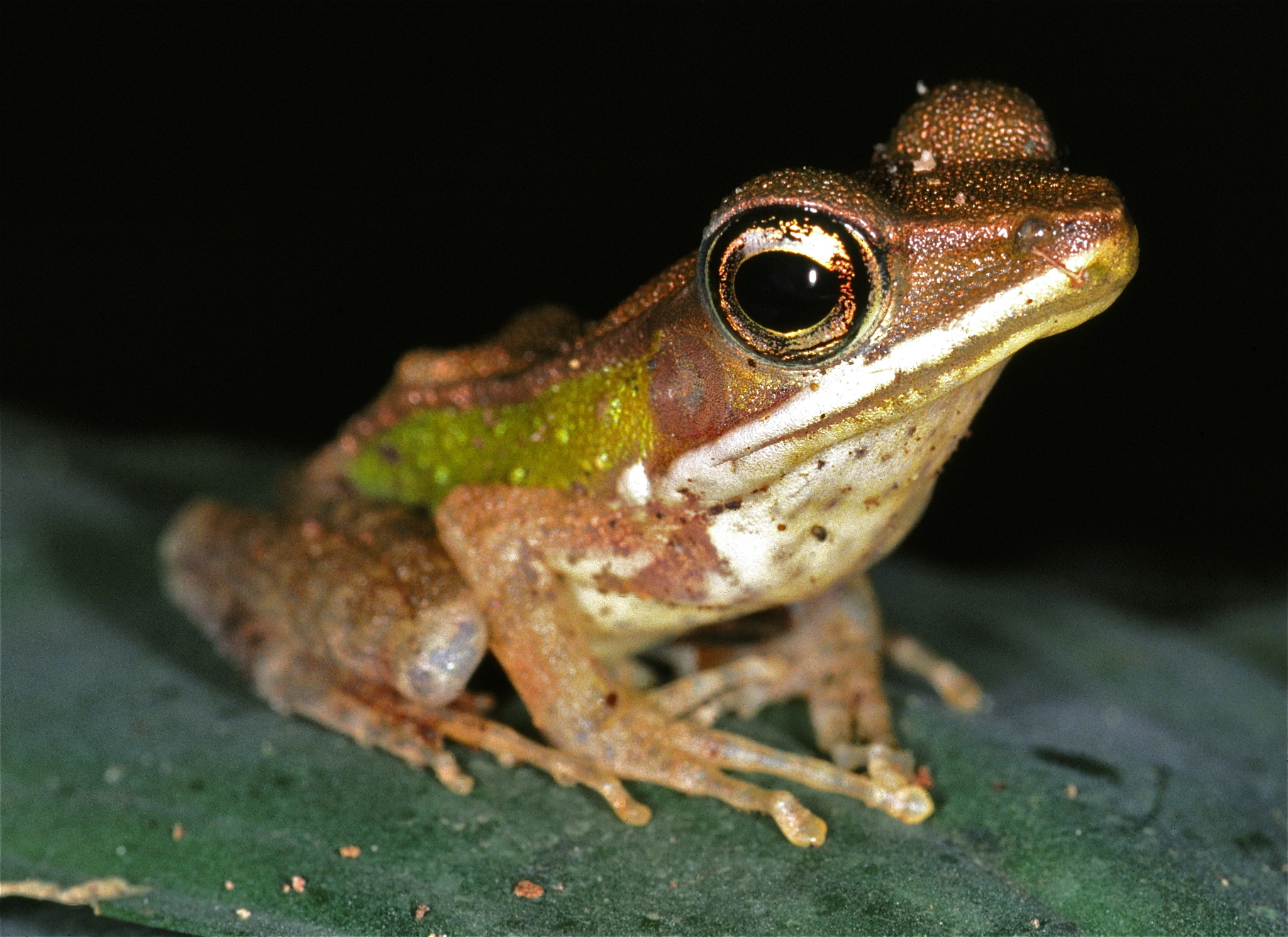

Conservation status
- Vulnerable (IUCN 3.1)

Scientific classification
- Kingdom: Animalia
- Phylum: Chordata
- Class: Amphibia
- Order: Anura
- Family: Ranidae
- Genus: Amnirana
- Species: A. asperrima

Binomial name
- Amnirana asperrima (Perret, 1977)

Synonyms
- Hylarana asperrima Perret, 1977

= Amnirana asperrima =

Species of frog

Amnirana asperrima is a species of frog in the family Ranidae. It is found in Cameroon and Nigeria. Its natural habitats are subtropical or tropical moist lowland forests, subtropical or tropical moist montane forests, and rivers. It is threatened by habitat loss.
