= Amnirana fonensis =

Conservation status
- Data Deficient (IUCN 3.1)

Scientific classification
- Kingdom: Animalia
- Phylum: Chordata
- Class: Amphibia
- Order: Anura
- Family: Ranidae
- Genus: Amnirana
- Species: A. fonensis

Binomial name
- Amnirana fonensis Rödel & Bangoura, 2004

Synonyms
- Hylarana fonensis (Rödel & Bangoura, 2004)

Species of frog

Amnirana fonensis is a species of frog in the family Ranidae. It is endemic to Simandou, Guinea.

Its natural habitat is subtropical or tropical moist lowland forests. It is threatened by habitat loss.
