= Ivory Coast Frog =

Conservation status
- Least Concern (IUCN 3.1)

Scientific classification
- Kingdom: Animalia
- Phylum: Chordata
- Class: Amphibia
- Order: Anura
- Family: Ranidae
- Genus: Hylarana
- Species: H. occidentalis

Binomial name
- Hylarana occidentalis Perret, 1960

Synonyms
- Amnirana occidentalis (Perret, 1960)

Species of frog

The Ivory Coast Frog (Hylarana occidentalis) is a species of frog in the family Ranidae. It was formerly placed in the genus Amnirana and still is in some taxonomic treatments. It is found in Ivory Coast, Ghana, Guinea, Liberia, and possibly Nigeria. Its natural habitats are subtropical or tropical moist lowland forests, freshwater marshes, and intermittent freshwater marshes. It is threatened by habitat loss.
