= Railway stations in Guinea =

Railway stations in Guinea include:

== Maps ==
- UNHCR Atlas Map (2004) shows topography.
- UN map shows provinces; towns; railways
- ReliefWeb Map - Topography and Rail
- ReliefWeb Map - Population density and Roads
- Matakan-Simandou-Pontiolo Railway - also shows line parameters
- Sharemap

Guinea Railway Map

== Cities served by rail ==
=== Santou - Dapilon (North Trans-Guinean Railway) ===
This 125km long standard gauge railway connects bauxite mines in the Santou II and Houda areas with a new port at Dapilon, both places in the north of Guinea.

=== Chemin de Fer de Boké ===
This 136km long standard gauge railway connects bauxite mines at Sangaredi with Port Kamsar.

- Port Kamsar - port
- Boké
- Sangarédi - bauxite mine

=== Chemin de fer de Conakry – Fria ===
This 127km line is 1,000 mm (3 ft 3+3/8 in) gauge and heads off in a northwestern direction. It shares its first 16km with Chemin de Fer de Guinee.

- Conakry - capital and port.
- Dubréka
- Fria - bauxite mine

=== Chemin de Fer de Guinee ===
This 662km line is 1,000 mm (3 ft 3+3/8 in) gauge. Conversion to 1,435 mm (4 ft 8 1/2 in) gauge has been proposed.

- Conakry - capital and port.
- Mambia - bauxite mine
- Kindia - provincial capital.
- Kouyeya - waystation
- Kolèntèn
- Sougeta - waystation
- Konkouré - several km north of railway
- Mamou - provincial capital
- Kégnégo
- Diagouré - proposed junction
- Dabola - junction and break of gauge
- Bissikrima
- Cisséla
- Kouroussa - bridge over Niger River
- Kankan terminus and provincial capital.

- (possible extension)
- Zogota

=== Tougué Branch ===
This proposed line is 1,435 mm (4 ft 8 1/2 in).

- Marela - possible junction to Chemin de Fer de Guinee line
- Diagouré - junction with Chemin de Fer de Guinee line
- Pontiola - bauxite
- Tougué - branch terminus - bauxite

=== Societe des Bauxites de Kindia (SBK) ===
This 105km line is standard gauge and parallels the Chemin de Fer de Guinee line between Canakry and Sofonia.

- Conakry - capital and port. Rail Map (red dots) Rail Map (gray lines)
- Kindia bauxite mine.

=== TransGuinean Railway (under construction 2025) ===
The Transguinean Railway will be 622km long and of 1,435 mm (4 ft 8+1/2 in) (standard gauge). It goes from iron ore mines in the south east and potentially bauxite mines in the north to a new port a Matakong.

- Matakong - proposed Deep water port
- Morebaya Port Terminal: rail unloading terminal
- Forécariah: passing station
- Kelemou: intermediate station
- Madina Woula: intermediate station
- Kassa: intermediate station
- Oure-Kaba: intermediate station
- Tagagna: passing station
- Laya: intermediate station
- Faranah: intermediate station
- Soroforia: intermediate station
- Douako: passing station
- Nialinko: intermediate station
- Diankoya: passing station
- Kerouane: technical operations station
- Feredou (Simandou Mine, WCS, Simandou blocks 1 and 2): rail loading terminal

There will be a branch to:

- Simfer Mine (Rio Tinto, Simandou blocks 3 and 4): rail loading terminal

=== Proposed Guinea - Liberia Railway ===
(This line would be heavy duty 1,435 mm (4 ft 8 1/2 in) gauge) This line is badly affected by the theft of rail spikes and plates which can cause derailments.

- Zogota iron ore
- Simandou (north) - iron ore deposit near Diéké
  - (Liberia) Nimba - iron ore
  - (Lamco Railway of 1,435 mm (4 ft 8 1/2 in) gauge) being rehabilitated by ArcelorMittal).
  - (Lamco Railway runs parallel to Guinea-Liberia Railway for a considerable distance)
  - (Liberia) Buchanan - closest port
- (Liberia) Didia. new port owned by BSG Resources.

=== Proposed Mali railway ===
- Kankan, Guinea.
- (Guinea) (Mali) border.
- Bamako, Mali.

== Timeline ==
=== 2025 ===
- Santou-Dapilon railway open.

=== 2020 ===
- Work starts on Dapilon (port) - Santou (mine) railway) 1435mm gauge

=== 2014 ===
- Conference

=== 2010 ===
- Guinea and Liberia agree to build transborder railway for iron ore traffic. This railway would be shorter and cheaper than a railway entirely within Guinea territory. As part of the deal, the narrow gauge Trans-Guinean railway would be renovated. 1435mm gauge. Later rescinded.

== See also ==
- Transport in Guinea
