= Transport in Guinea =

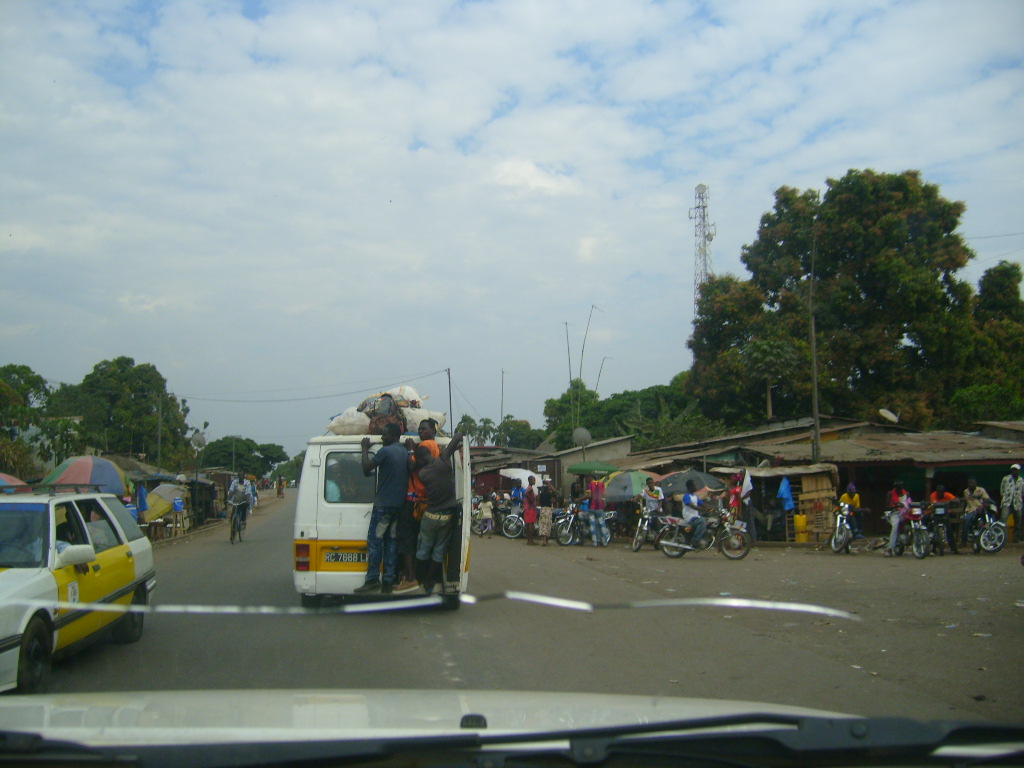
Three men hold on to the back of a moving matatu, Guinea, 2014.

Transport in Guinea is composed by a variety of systems that people in the country use to get around as well as to and from domestic and international destinations. The railway from Conakry to Kankan ceased operating in the mid-1980s. Most vehicles in Guinea are 20+ years old, and cabs are any four-door vehicle which the owner has designated as being for hire. Domestic air services are intermittent. Conakry International Airport is the largest airport in the country, with flights to other cities in Africa as well as to Europe.

Locals, nearly entirely without vehicles of their own, rely upon these taxis (which charge per seat) and small buses to take them around town and across the country. There is some river traffic on the Niger and Milo rivers. Horses and donkeys pull carts, primarily to transport construction materials.

Iron mining at Simandou (North and South blocks) in the southeast is leading to the construction of a new heavy-haul standard gauge railway and deep-water port. Bauxite mining at Kalia in the east is may link to this line.

== Transport Infrastructure & Railways ==
1000 mm gauge tracks 1435 mm gauge tracks

total: 1,155km
standard gauge: 366km 1,435 mm (4 ft 8 1/2 in) gauge
metre gauge: 789km 1,000 mm (3 ft 3 3/8 in) gauge (includes 662km in common carrier service from Kankan to Conakry)

The lines do not all connect.

=== Santou - Dapilon ===
This 125km long standard gauge railway connects bauxite mines in the Santou II and Houda areas with a new port at Dapilon, both places in the north of Guinea.

See: Boffa-Boke Railway

=== Chemin de Fer de Boké ===
This 136km long standard gauge railway connects bauxite mines at Sangaredi with Port Kamsar and carries about 12,000,000 t (11,810,478 long tons; 13,227,736 short tons) per annum.

=== Chemin de fer de Conakry – Fria ===
This 127km line is 1,000 mm (3 ft 3 3/8 in) gauge and heads off in a northwestern direction. It shares its first 16km with Chemin de Fer de Guinee.

=== Chemin de Fer de Guinee ===
This 662km line is 1,000 mm (3 ft 3 3/8 in) gauge. Conversion to 1,435 mm (4 ft 8 1/2 in) gauge has been proposed.

=== Societe des Bauxites de Kindia (SBK) ===
This 105km line is standard gauge and parallels the Chemin de Fer de Guinee line between Canakry and Sofonia.

- Rail Map (red dots) Rail Map (gray lines)

=== TransGuinean Railway (under construction 2025) ===
The Transguinean Railway will be 622km long and of 1,435 mm (4 ft 8 1/2 in) (standard gauge). It goes from Simandou iron ore mines in the south east to a new port at Matakong.

=== Timeline ===
2021

- Santou - Dapilon commenced operation.

==== 2019 ====
- Télimélé - Boffa

==== 2008 ====
- July 2008 - wobbles over Simandou leases
- four ex-Croatian locomotives refurbished and regauged in Russia

==== 1994 ====
- Progress

=== Statistics ===
- Length

== Highways ==
total: 30,500 km
paved: 5,033 km
unpaved: 25,467 km (1996 est.)

The Trans–West African Coastal Highway crosses Guinea, connecting it to Bissau (Guinea-Bissau), and when construction in Sierra Leone and Liberia is complete, to a total of 13 other nations of the Economic Community of West African States (ECOWAS).

== Waterways ==
1,295 km navigable by shallow-draft native craft

== Ports and harbors ==
- Boké, Conakry, Kamsar

Conakry is Guinea's principal seaport and handles most of the country's general and container traffic. Its container terminal has been operated since 2011 under a concession by Bolloré (now Africa Global Logistics), which built a 340-metre berth with a draught of about 13 metres. The ports of Kamsar and Boké mainly serve bauxite exports.

== Merchant marine ==
none (1999 est.)

== Airports ==
15 (1999 est.)

=== Airports - with paved runways ===
total: 5
over 3,047 m: 1
2,438 to 3,047 m: 1
1,524 to 2,437 m: 3 (1999 est.)

The airport code for the capital, Conakry, is CKY.

=== Airports - with unpaved runways ===
total: 10
1,524 to 2,437 m: 5
914 to 1,523 m: 4
under 914 m: 1 (1999 est.)

== See also ==
- Economy of Guinea
- Rail transport in Guinea
- Railway stations in Guinea
- Transguinean Railways
