= Zogota =

Coordinates: 07°37′00″N 07°25′00″W

Zogota is a town in southeastern Guinea.

== Mining ==
It is the site of large iron ore deposits. Initial production proposed for 2012 is 2 mtpa. The mine was owned by BSG Resources, until it was in 2018 arbitraged to Niron Metals.

The mine will be connected by a standard gauge railway across the border to a port in Liberia.

== See also ==
- Railway stations in Guinea
