= Matakong =

Matakong, Forécariah Prefecture
- Location in Guinea
- Coordinates: 09°16′20″N 13°25′20″W
- Country: Guinea
- Prefecture: Forécariah Prefecture
- Elevation: 3.3 ft (1 m)

Matakong is an island just off the coast of Guinea between the capital Conakry and the Sierra Leone border.

== Nomenclature ==
Matakong is also called Matakan.

== Transport ==
Matakong is the proposed port terminus of the heavy duty standard gauge Trans-Guinean Railway, aimed at transporting large iron and bauxite deposits to the coast, notably from the mines at Simandou, 650km east . The proposed Bellzone iron ore mine at Kalia may also share this railway line.

=== New port ===
A new deep water port is needed because, firstly, the port at Conakry is built out and there is no room, and secondly, because a new port at Matakong has better access though flatter ground to the hinterland.

A 20 km pier may be needed to reach deep water suitable for panamax size ships. An artificial island contains the ship loader and ore dumps, and these is connected by a conveyor belt from the railway unloaded on the mainland. It is not known if the railway terminates in a Balloon loop.

== See also ==
- Transport in Guinea
- Railway stations in Guinea
- List of deep water ports (void)
- List of Panamax ports
