= Sangarédi =

- Sub-prefecture and town
- Location in Guinea
- Coordinates: 11°06′N 13°46′W
- Country: Guinea
- Region: Boke Region
- Elevation: 456 ft (139 m)

Population (2016)
  - Total: 81,736

Sangarédi is a mining town and sub-prefecture in western Guinea, where bauxite is mined. The ore is shipped by a railway to the Atlantic coast port of Kamsar, 135km to the west. As of 2016, Sangarédi had a population of 81,736 people, an increase of around 5% in just two years from 2014 due to the expansion of the area's three bauxite mines and refinery by CBG (the Compagnie des bauxites de Guinée) which currently produces around 14,000,000 tonnes per year from Sangarédi.

== Transport ==
The town is served by Sangarédi Airport.

== Sport ==
Sangarédi is home to the Stade Dr. Hillal Gassim, a large sports complex where the local football team, Association Sportive des Mineurs de Sangarédi (ASMS) plays.
