= Kamsar =

- Sub-prefecture and city
- Location in Guinea
- Coordinates: 10°39′N 14°37′W
- Country: Guinea
- Region: Boke Region
- Prefecture: Boké Prefecture

Government
  - Mayor: Chérif Kibola Camara

Population (2025)
  - Sub-prefecture and city: 148,000
  - Rank: 7th in Guinea
  - Urban: 133,696

Kamsar is a port city in Guinea, West Africa. It is also a Sub-prefecture of Guinea. It is located on the mouth of the Nunez River.

Port Kamsar handles significant part of the world's bauxite production. Ships calling Port Kamsar and going direct to the quay of Guinea Bauxite Company for loading bauxites are limited to length overall (LOA) 229 m. Ship length restrictions led to appearance of the new dry bulk carrier categories – Kamsarmax.

== Transport ==
It has a standard gauge railway line feeding bauxite from the mine at Sangarédi to the port.

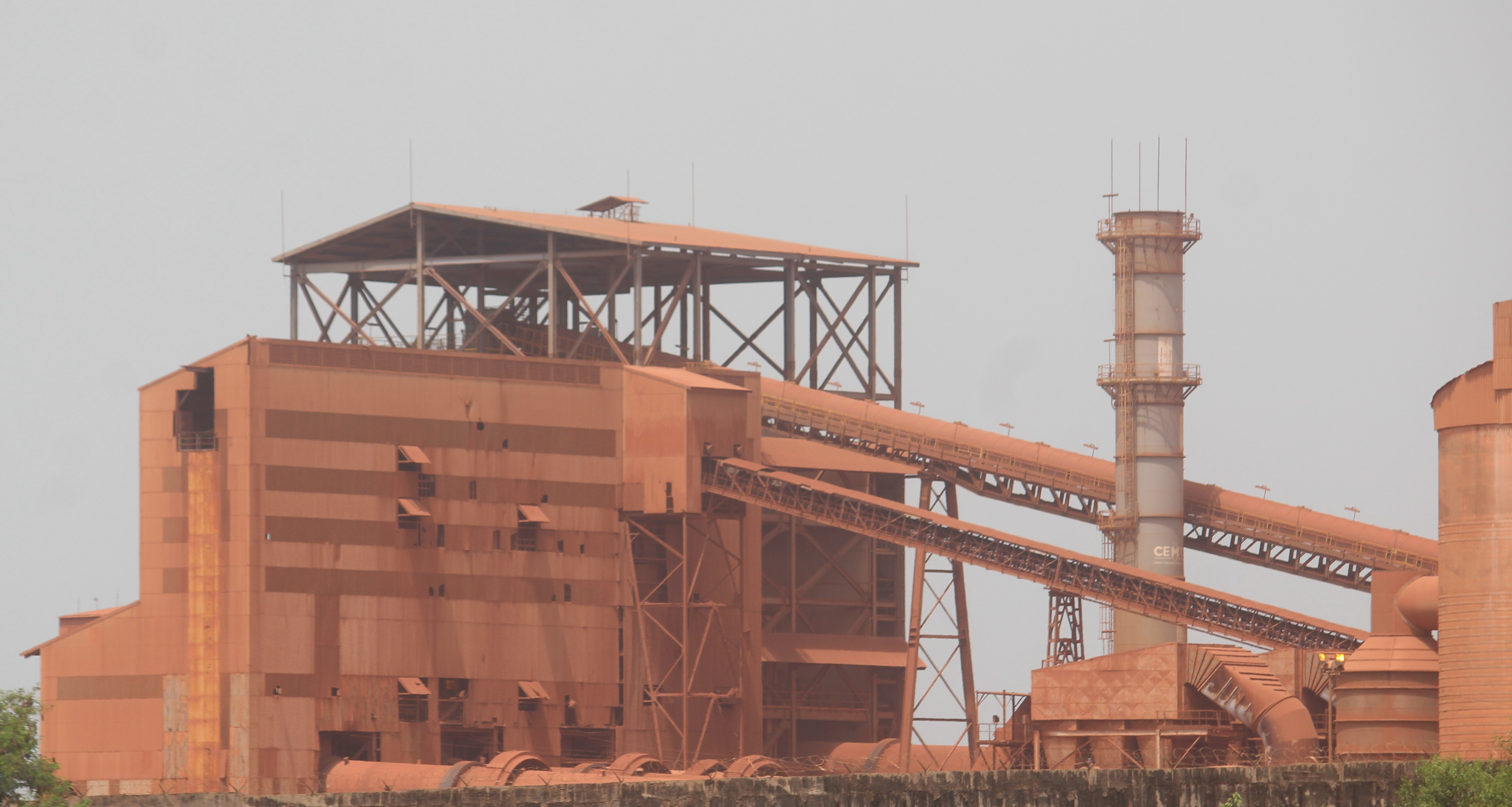

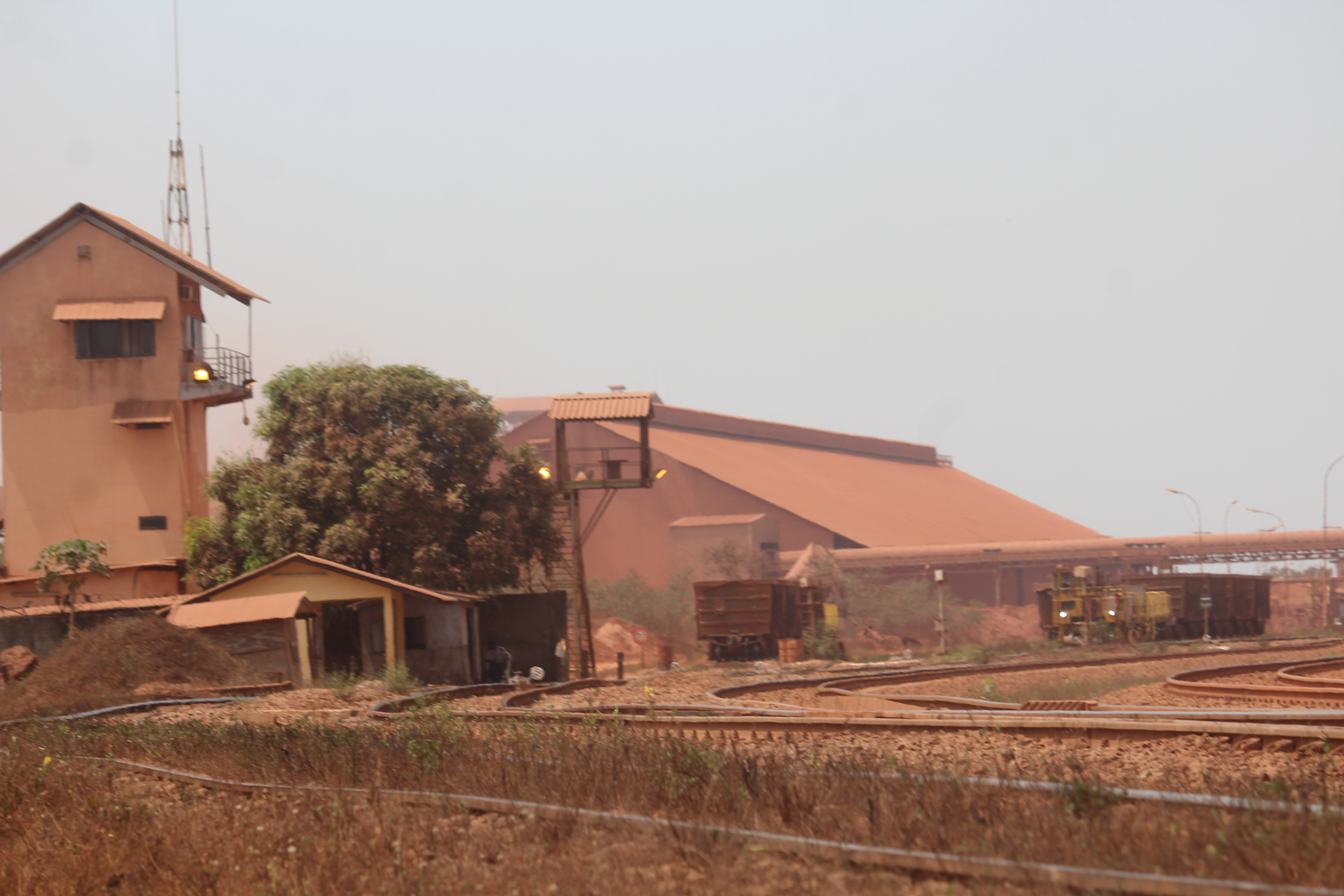

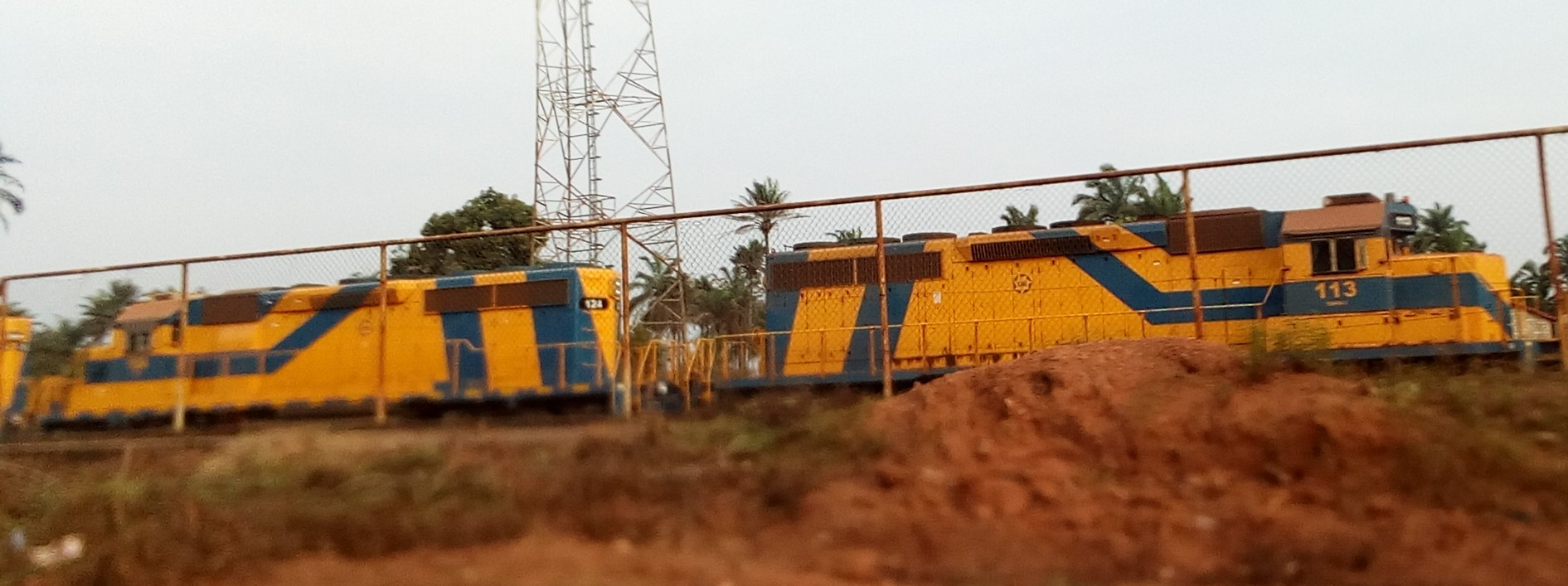

The city is served by Kawass Airport.

== Climate ==
Kamsar has a tropical monsoon climate (Köppen Am) with little to no rainfall from December to April, moderate rainfall in May and November and heavy to extremely heavy rainfall from June to October. Temperatures are very warm to hot all year round, with a slight depression due to cloud cover in the wet season.

Climate data for Kamsar
| Month | Jan | Feb | Mar | Apr | May | Jun | Jul | Aug | Sep | Oct | Nov | Dec | Year |
|---|---|---|---|---|---|---|---|---|---|---|---|---|---|
| Daily mean °C (°F) | 26.2 (79.1) | 26.4 (79.6) | 27.9 (82.3) | 28.7 (83.6) | 28.4 (83.2) | 26.8 (80.3) | 25.9 (78.7) | 25.7 (78.3) | 25.8 (78.5) | 26.3 (79.4) | 26.3 (79.4) | 24.9 (76.9) | 26.6 (79.9) |
| Average rainfall mm (inches) | 0 (0) | 0 (0) | 0 (0) | 6 (0.2) | 72 (2.8) | 305 (12.0) | 772 (30.4) | 999 (39.3) | 465 (18.3) | 304 (12.0) | 70 (2.8) | 5 (0.2) | 2,998 (118) |
Source: Climate-Data.org (rainfall)

== Hospitals ==
- Hôpital ANAIM
- Centre de Santé de Kassapô

== Places of Worship ==
- Mosquée CBG
- Église St. Jean Baptiste
- Mosquée Bagataye
- Mosquée Bas-Fond
- Mosquée Siminoune

== See also ==
- Transport in Guinea
- Railway stations in Guinea
