= Simandou =

Hill range in Guinea

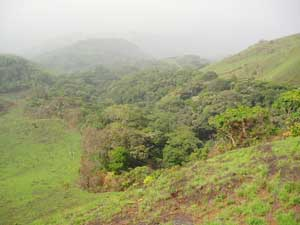
- Forest in the Simandou chain

Highest point
- Elevation: 1,656 m (5,433 ft)
- Prominence: 1,104 m (3,622 ft)
- Listing: Ribu

Dimensions
- Length: 110 km (68 mi)

Geography
- Location within Guinea
- Country: Guinea
- Region: Nzérékoré
- Range coordinates: 08°32′N 08°54′W

Simandou is a 110-kilometre-long (68 mi) range of hills located in the Nzérékoré and Kankan regions of southeastern Guinea, in the country's mountainous, forested Guinée forestière region. At the southern end of the range, the site of a large iron ore deposit is currently being developed.

== Geography ==
The Simandou Range extends north and south. It is located east of Banankoro and Kérouané, from southern Kankan Region into northern Nzérékoré Region. The highest point is Pic de Fon, elevation 1,658 m (5,440 ft), in the southern portion of the range. Other peaks include Pic de Tibé, elevation 1,504 m (4,934 ft), located at the center of the range, and Pic de Going, 1,431 m (4,695 ft), to the north.

== Geology ==
The Simandou Range consists of a sequence of deformed itabirites, phyllites, and quartzites within Proterozoic basement rocks.

== Ecology and natural history ==
The Simandou Range is an important area of conservation for the Guinean forest ecosystem of West Africa, one of the world's biologically richest and most endangered terrestrial ecosystems. The Upper Guinean forests ecosystem, of which the Simandou Range forms part of, extends across southern Guinea, Sierra Leone, Liberia, southern Ivory Coast, Ghana, and western Togo. It is believed to have once covered as much as 420,000 km^{2} (160,000 sq mi), but over centuries of human activity, nearly 70 percent of the original forest cover has disappeared, leaving isolated patches of different forest types that host ecological communities of exceptional diversity and numerous endemic species.

The variety of habitats found in the Simandou Range include humid Guinean savanna, Western Guinean lowland forest, montane and gallery forests, and the rare and endangered West African montane grassland habitat. The Pic de Fon forest at the southern end of the range is a relatively intact area of approximately 25,600 ha that contains many typical flora and fauna of the Guinean montane forests ecosystem, including endangered species such as the Nimba otter shrew (Micropotamogale lamottei), the West African chimpanzee (Pan troglodytes verus), the Diana monkey (Cercopithecus diana diana), and the Sierra Leone prinia (Schistolais leontica), a bird of the West African highlands known from only three other sites in the world. The frog Amnirana fonensis is known from nowhere else.

The area has so far been protected by relative isolation, but its biodiversity is now threatened by the encroachment of agriculture, unregulated bushmeat hunting, logging, uncontrolled bush fires, road development, destructive mining operations by foreign companies, and human population growth. Government agencies' lack of capacity to enforce environmental legislation increases the threat. Land tenure conflicts and ecologically destructive subsistence farming practices (slash and burn agriculture), exacerbated by poverty, also pose problems for the environment.

The range has two classified forests: Pic de Fon, designated in 1953, with an area of 256 km^{2}, and Pic de Tibé, designated in 1945, with an area of 60.75 km^{2}.

== Mining ==
Simandou has the potential to become the site of the largest integrated iron ore mine and infrastructure project ever developed in Africa, consisting of a large new source of iron ore and creating a 650 km new railway to the Guinean coast at Matakong. However, the potentially lucrative blocks I and II were mired for several years later in litigation of possible corruption. This corruption, which occurred through the use of bribery, involved two Western foreign companies: Rio Tinto, a British-Australian company, and BSGR. Around 2015, the mining project seemed to have been sidelined due to dwindling global iron demand. However, a version of the full original mining project was re-instated in late 2019 and confirmed in 2020 with the signing of a new agreement with the Chinese company SMB-Winning.

== Namesake ==
There is a town of the same name in nearby Ivory Coast.

This town is not to be confused with Siamandou further to the west.

== See also ==
- Transport in Guinea
- Railway stations in Guinea
- Iron ore in Africa
