= Cuisine of Guinea =

Culinary tradition

Location of Guinea

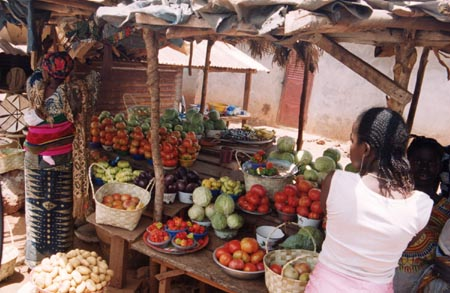
A market stall selling vegetables in Dinguiraye Prefecture, Guinea

Guinean cuisine, part of the larger West African cuisine, includes a variety of traditional dishes, sauces, and beverages.

In rural areas, food is eaten from a large serving dish and eaten by hand outside. Desserts are uncommon. Guinean cuisine has achieved some popularity overseas and there are Guinean restaurants in New York City, United States.

== Major ingredients ==
Corn is a staple with preparations and ingredients varying between the regions of Coastal Guinea, Mid Guinea, Upper Guinea, Forest Guinea, and the area of the capital (Conakry).

Fonio is a pair of closely related cultivated grasses that are a vital food source in many rural areas, especially in the mountains of Fouta Djalon in Guinea. Guinea annually produces the most fonio in the world, accounting for over 75% of the world's production in 2019.

Other major recurring ingredients in traditional dishes include cassava, plantains, cocoyams, sweet potatoes, okra, peanuts, and hibiscus.

== Notable dishes ==
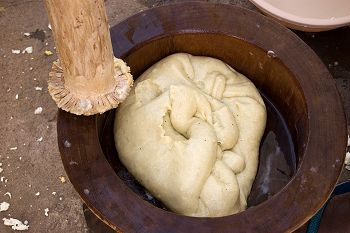
Traditional preparation of fou fou in a mortar and pestle

Some traditional Guinean dishes include:

- Fou fou, also known as tôreuy, a savory dough topped with okra sauce
- Bwayry
- Cooked mango
- Fried plantain
- Patates
- Gateau farine, a variety of round cake
- Thiacri, a sweet Senegalese couscous and milk dish
- Poule
- Konkoé, smoked catfish and vegetable stew
- Bissap, a hibiscus drink that is purple-coloured and sometimes includes mint
- Attieke, a dish with fish or tilapia sauce topped with cucumbers and tomatoes
- Katun, a variety of goat cheese
- Fouti, consisting of okra with rice
- Jollof corn
- Tapalapa bread

== Sauces ==
Some traditional Guinean sauces include:

- Footi, a thick sauce consisting of water, eggplants, onions, kidney beans, tomatoes, and a bouillon cube
- Maffe tiga, a Guinean/Senegalese-style peanut sauce
- Maffi gombo, an okra sauce
- Maffi hakko Bantura, a leafy sauce with sweet potato
- Maffi supu
- Sauce d'arrachide ou kansiyé, a sauce consisting of water, peanut butter, hot chili peppers, tomatoes, garlic, and onions
- Maafe taku, a sauce made with okra

== Beverages ==
Some traditional Guinean beverages include:

- Ginger drink
- Jus de bissap, a Hibiscus drink
- Palm wine, consumed in non-Muslim areas
- Tamarind drink
