= Geography of Guinea =

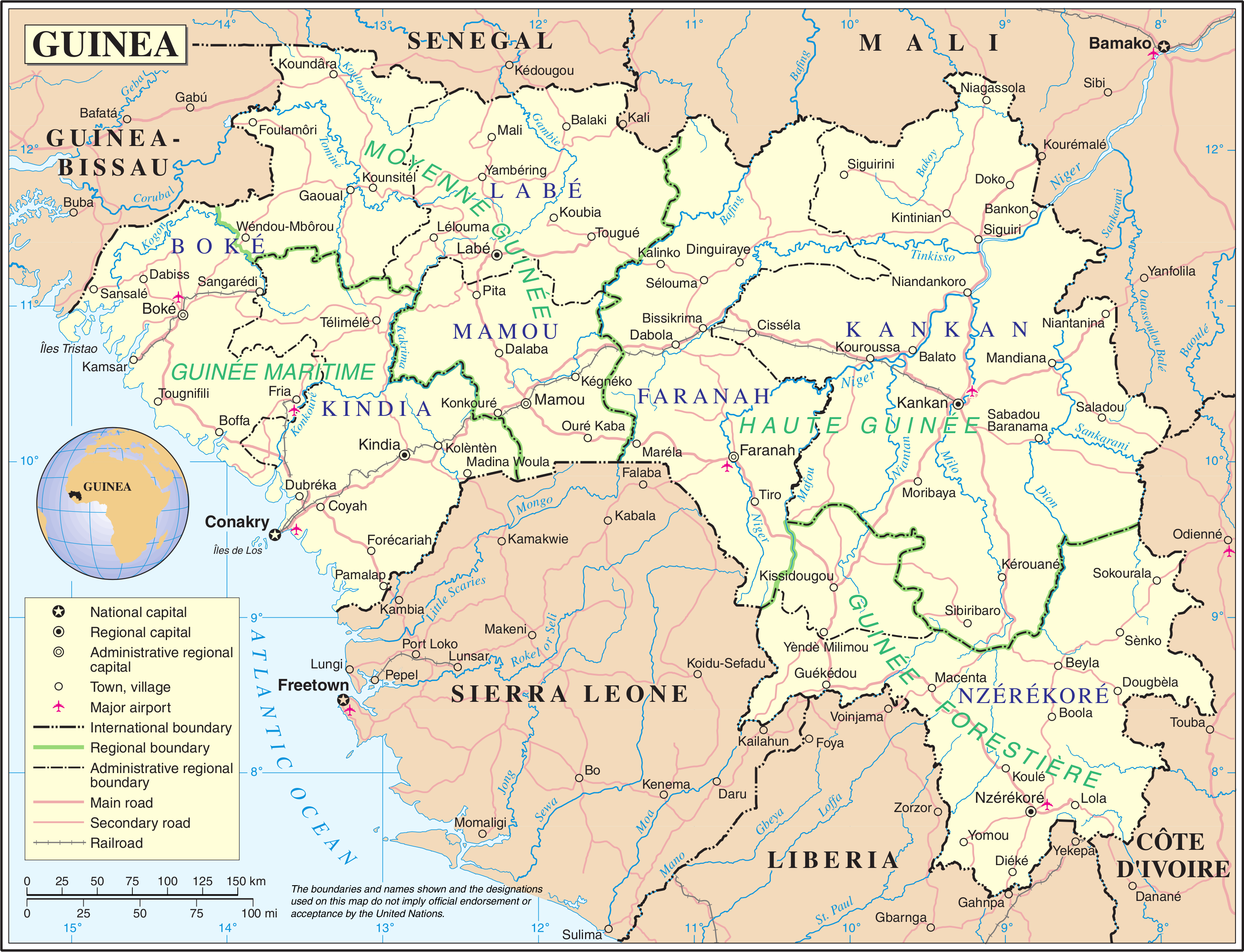
A map showing Guinea's cities and administrative divisions.

Location of Guinea

Guinea is a country on the coast of West Africa and is bordered by Guinea-Bissau, Senegal, Mali, Ivory Coast, Liberia, and Sierra Leone.

Guinea is divided into four geographic regions: Maritime Guinea (Lower Guinea) a coastal plain running north to south behind the coast; the pastoral Fouta Djallon highlands (Middle Guinea); the northern savanna (Upper Guinea); and a southeastern rain-forest region (Forest Guinea).

== Location ==
Guinea lies in western Africa, bordering the North Atlantic Ocean, between Guinea-Bissau and Sierra Leone. Its geographic coordinates are 11°00′N 10°00′W.

== Area and boundaries ==
Area
- Total: 245,857 km²
  - country rank in the world: 77th
- Land: 245,717 km²
- Water: 140 km²

Area comparative
- Australia comparative: slightly larger than Victoria
- Canada comparative: slightly more than 1/2 the size of the Yukon
- United Kingdom comparative: approximately the size of the United Kingdom
- United States comparative: slightly smaller than Oregon
- EU comparative: slightly larger than Romania

Guinea's land boundaries span a total of 4,046 km: with Ivory Coast 816 km, Guinea-Bissau 421 km, Liberia 590 km, Mali 1,062 km, Senegal 363 km, and Sierra Leone 794 km. It has a 320-km coastline, and claims an exclusive economic zone of 200 nmi (370.4 km; 230.2 mi), with a territorial sea of 12 nmi (22.2 km; 13.8 mi).

== Climate ==
The coastal region of Guinea and most of the inland have a tropical climate, with a monsoonal-type rainy season lasting from April to November, relatively high and uniform temperatures, southwesterly winds, and high humidity.

The capital Conakry's year-round average high is 32 °C (89.6 °F), and the low is 21 °C (69.8 °F). Conakry's average annual rainfall is almost 3,800 mm (149.6 in). Sahelian Upper Guinea has a shorter rainy season and greater daily temperature variations. There is a dry season (December to May) with northeasterly harmattan winds.

Climate data for Conakry (1961-1990)
Month	Jan	Feb	Mar	Apr	May	Jun	Jul	Aug	Sep	Oct	Nov	Dec	Year
Mean daily maximum °C (°F)	32.2 (90.0)	33.1 (91.6)	33.4 (92.1)	33.6 (92.5)	33.2 (91.8)	31.8 (89.2)	30.2 (86.4)	29.9 (85.8)	30.6 (87.1)	30.9 (87.6)	32.0 (89.6)	32.2 (90.0)	31.9 (89.4)
Daily mean °C (°F)	26.1 (79.0)	26.5 (79.7)	27.0 (80.6)	27.4 (81.3)	27.5 (81.5)	26.5 (79.7)	25.5 (77.9)	25.2 (77.4)	25.6 (78.1)	26.3 (79.3)	27.0 (80.6)	26.6 (79.9)	26.4 (79.5)
Mean daily minimum °C (°F)	19.0 (66.2)	20.2 (68.4)	21.2 (70.2)	22.0 (71.6)	20.7 (69.3)	20.2 (68.4)	20.4 (68.7)	20.8 (69.4)	20.7 (69.3)	20.4 (68.7)	21.0 (69.8)	20.1 (68.2)	20.6 (69.1)
Average rainfall mm (inches)	1 (0.0)	1 (0.0)	3 (0.1)	22 (0.9)	137 (5.4)	396 (15.6)	1,130 (44.5)	1,104 (43.5)	617 (24.3)	295 (11.6)	70 (2.8)	8 (0.3)	3,784 (149.0)
Average rainy days (≥ 1.0 mm)	0	0	0	2	9	18	27	27	22	17	6	1	129
Average relative humidity (%)	71	70	68	70	74	81	85	87	85	81	79	73	77
Mean monthly sunshine hours	223	224	251	222	208	153	109	87	135	189	207	214	2,222
Source: NOAA

== Rivers and water ==
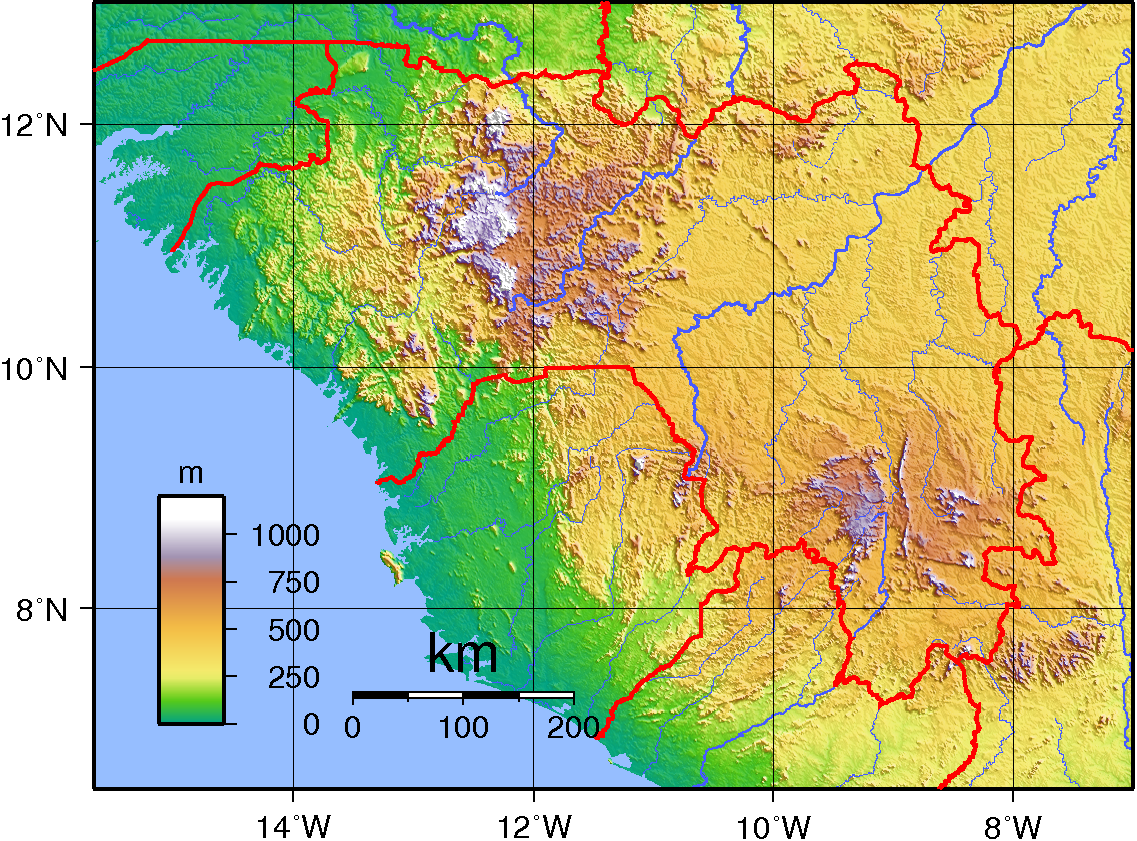
Guinea's topography.

The Niger River, the Gambia River, and the Senegal River are among the 22 West African rivers that have their origins in Guinea.

== Ecoregions ==
- Guinean forest-savanna mosaic covers most of the country, covering most of Maritime Guinea and Upper Guinea, as well as the lower elevations of the Fouta Djallon. It extends north into Guinea Bissau and Senegal, and east through Mali and Ivory Coast.
- Western Guinean lowland forests occupies the southwestern portion of Maritime Guinea around Conakry, and Forest Guinea, along with coastal Sierra Leone, Liberia, and western Ivory Coast.
- Guinean montane forests, cover the Fouta Djallon and Guinea Highlands of southeast Guinea above an elevation of 600 meters.
- Guinean mangroves, in the coastal estuaries. Enclaves extend north into Guinea Bissau, Gambia and Senegal, and southeast through Sierra Leone, Liberia, and Ivory Coast.

== Resources and environment ==
The country's natural resources include bauxite, iron ore, diamonds, gold, uranium, hydropower, fish, and salt. It has 12.21% arable land, and 2.85% of the land is permanent crops. 949.2 km^{2} (2003) of land is irrigated. Guinea's total renewable water resources total 226 km^{3}.

=== Environmental issues ===
Current environmental issues in Guinea include: deforestation; inadequate supplies of potable water; desertification; soil contamination and erosion; and overfishing and overpopulation in forest regions. Poor mining practices have led to environmental damage.

Guinea is party to the following international environmental agreements: Biodiversity, Desertification, Endangered Species, Hazardous Wastes, Law of the Sea, Ozone Layer Protection, Ship Pollution, Wetlands, Whaling.

=== Tree cover extent and loss ===
Global Forest Watch publishes annual estimates of tree cover loss and 2000 tree cover extent derived from time-series analysis of Landsat satellite imagery in the Global Forest Change dataset. In this framework, tree cover refers to vegetation taller than 5 m (including natural forests and tree plantations), and tree cover loss is defined as the complete removal of tree cover canopy for a given year, regardless of cause.

For Guinea, country statistics report cumulative tree cover loss of 2,292,469 ha (22,924.69 km^{2}) from 2001 to 2024 (about 28.1% of its 2000 tree cover area). For tree cover density greater than 30%, country statistics report a 2000 tree cover extent of 8,159,635 ha (81,596.35 km^{2}). The charts and table below display this data. In simple terms, the annual loss number is the area where tree cover disappeared in that year, and the extent number shows what remains of the 2000 tree cover baseline after subtracting cumulative loss. Forest regrowth is not included in the dataset.

Annual tree cover loss in Guinea, 2001–2024. View chart definition.
Tree cover extent in 2000 minus cumulative tree cover loss in Guinea, 2001–2024 (loss-only residual; does not account for gain). View chart definition.

Annual tree cover extent and loss
Year	Tree cover extent (km2) (Note: This residual measure does not include forest regrowth.)	Annual tree cover loss (km2)
2001	81,410.64	185.71
2002	81,121.31	289.33
2003	81,029.02	92.29
2004	80,857.44	171.58
2005	80,711.62	145.82
2006	80,558.56	153.06
2007	80,220.34	338.22
2008	80,005.53	214.81
2009	79,771.65	233.88
2010	79,611.20	160.45
2011	79,334.82	276.38
2012	79,089.96	244.86
2013	77,628.11	1,461.85
2014	76,300.94	1,327.17
2015	74,682.74	1,618.20
2016	72,522.62	2,160.12
2017	70,206.74	2,315.88
2018	68,377.79	1,828.95
2019	66,440.89	1,936.90
2020	64,656.82	1,784.07
2021	62,983.05	1,673.77
2022	61,680.90	1,302.15
2023	60,139.68	1,541.22
2024	58,671.66	1,468.02

=== REDD+ reference levels and monitoring ===
Under the UNFCCC REDD+ framework, Guinea has submitted national reference levels for results-based payments. On the UNFCCC REDD+ Web Platform, the country's 2026 submission is listed as "under technical assessment", while the other Warsaw Framework elements - a national strategy, safeguards, and a national forest monitoring system - are listed as "not reported".

The 2026 submission proposes a national forest reference emission level (FREL) and forest reference level (FRL) for the reference period 2016-2020. It includes three REDD+ activities - reducing emissions from deforestation, reducing emissions from forest degradation, and enhancement of forest carbon stocks - while excluding conservation of forest carbon stocks and sustainable management of forests. The submission reports a proposed FREL of 13,653,757.82 t CO2 eq per year and a proposed FRL of zero t CO2 per year.

The submission applies a forest definition based on the national forest code: land larger than 0.5 hectares, with canopy cover above 10 percent and trees capable of reaching at least 5 metres in height at maturity. It includes above-ground biomass and below-ground biomass only, and reports CO2 only. Although the REDD+ Web Platform lists a national forest monitoring system as not reported, the submission states that the reference levels are linked to Guinea's Système National de Surveillance des Forêts and that activity data were derived from a sample-based system of 1,688 plots interpreted through Collect Earth Online.

== Terrain ==
Its terrain is generally flat coastal plain, hilly to mountainous interior. The country's lowest point is the Atlantic Ocean (0 m), and highest is Mont Nimba (1,752 m).

A recent global remote sensing analysis suggested that there were 549km² of tidal flats in Guinea, making it the 47th ranked country in terms of tidal flat area.

This is a list of the extreme points of Guinea, the points that are farther north, south, east or west than any other location.

- Northernmost point – the northern section of the border with Senegal, Boké Region*.
- Easternmost point – the confluence of the Gben river and the Férédougouba river on the border with Ivory Coast, Nzérékoré Region.
- Southernmost point – unnamed location on the border with Liberia immediately south of the village of Gonon, Nzérékoré Region.
- Westernmost point – Ile du Noufrage, Boké Region.
- Westernmost point (mainland) – the point at which the border with Guinea-Bissau enters the Rio Compony estuary.
- *Note: Guinea does not have a northernmost point, this section of the border being formed by a straight latitudinal line

== See also ==
- Administrative divisions of Guinea
