= Subdivisions of Guinea =

Geographical divisions of Guinea

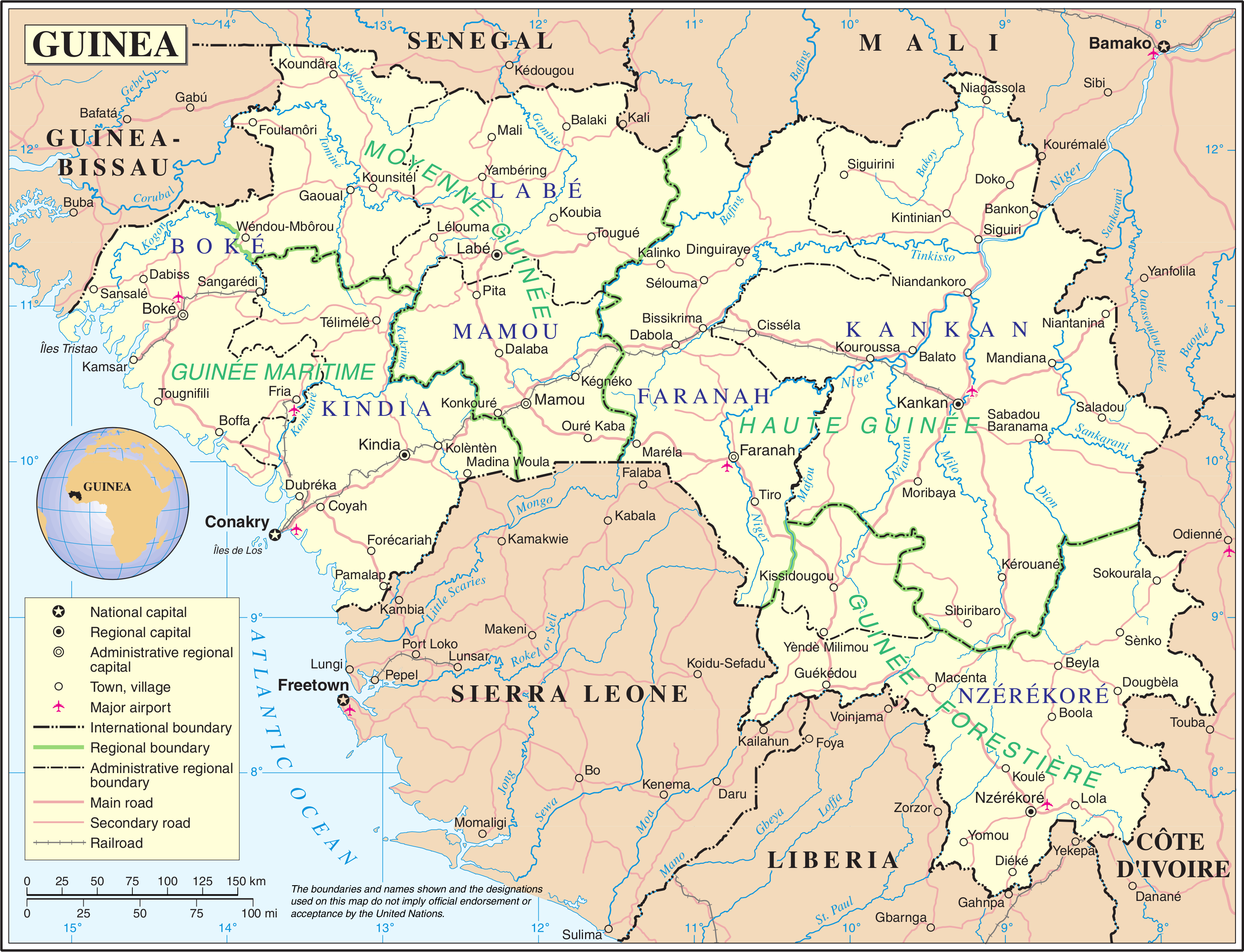
Guinea's natural regions of Maritime, Middle, Upper, and Forested.

Guinea is divided into four natural regions with distinct human, geographic, and climatic characteristics:

- Maritime Guinea (La Guinée Maritime) covers 34% of the country
- Middle Guinea (La Moyenne-Guinée) covers 20% of the country
- Upper Guinea (La Haute-Guinée) covers 38% of the country
- Forested Guinea (Guinée Forestière) covers 23% of the country, and is both forested and mountainous

== Government divisions ==
=== Regions ===
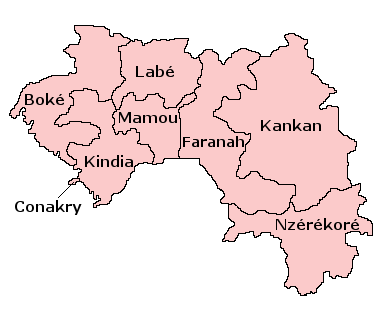
Regions of Guinea.

Guinea is divided into seven administrative regions. The national capital, Conakry, ranks as a special zone.

Region	Capital	Area (km^{2})	Population (2014 census)
Conakry Region	Conakry	450	1,660,973
Nzérékoré Region	Nzérékoré	37,658	1,527,030
Kankan Region	Kankan	72,145	1,972,537
Kindia Region	Kindia	28,873	1,561,374
Boké Region	Boké	31,186	1,083,147
Labé Region	Labé	22,869	994,458
Faranah Region	Faranah	35,581	941,554
Mamou Region	Mamou	17,074	731,188

- The capital Conakry with a population of 1,660,973 ranks as a special zone.

=== Prefectures ===
Guinea's regions are subdivided into thirty-three prefectures and one special zone, Conakry.

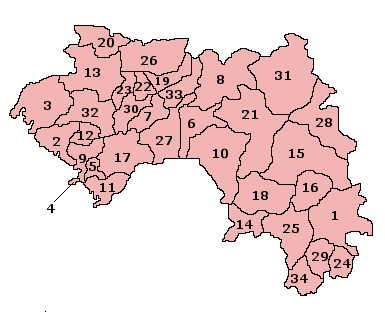
Prefectures of Guinea.

1. Beyla
2. Boffa
3. Boké
4. Conakry
5. Coyah
6. Dabola
7. Dalaba
8. Dinguiraye
9. Dubréka
10. Faranah
11. Forécariah
12. Fria
13. Gaoual
14. Guéckédou
15. Kankan
16. Kérouané
17. Kindia
18. Kissidougou
19. Koubia
20. Koundara
21. Kouroussa
22. Labé
23. Lélouma
24. Lola
25. Macenta
26. Mali
27. Mamou
28. Mandiana
29. Nzérékoré
30. Pita
31. Siguiri
32. Télimélé
33. Tougué
34. Yomou

=== Sub-prefectures ===
The Communes of Guinea or sub prefectures, known in French as sous-prefectures, are the third-level administrative divisions in Guinea. As of 2009 there were 303 rural communes of Guinea and 38 urban communes, 5 of which compose the Conakry greater urban area.

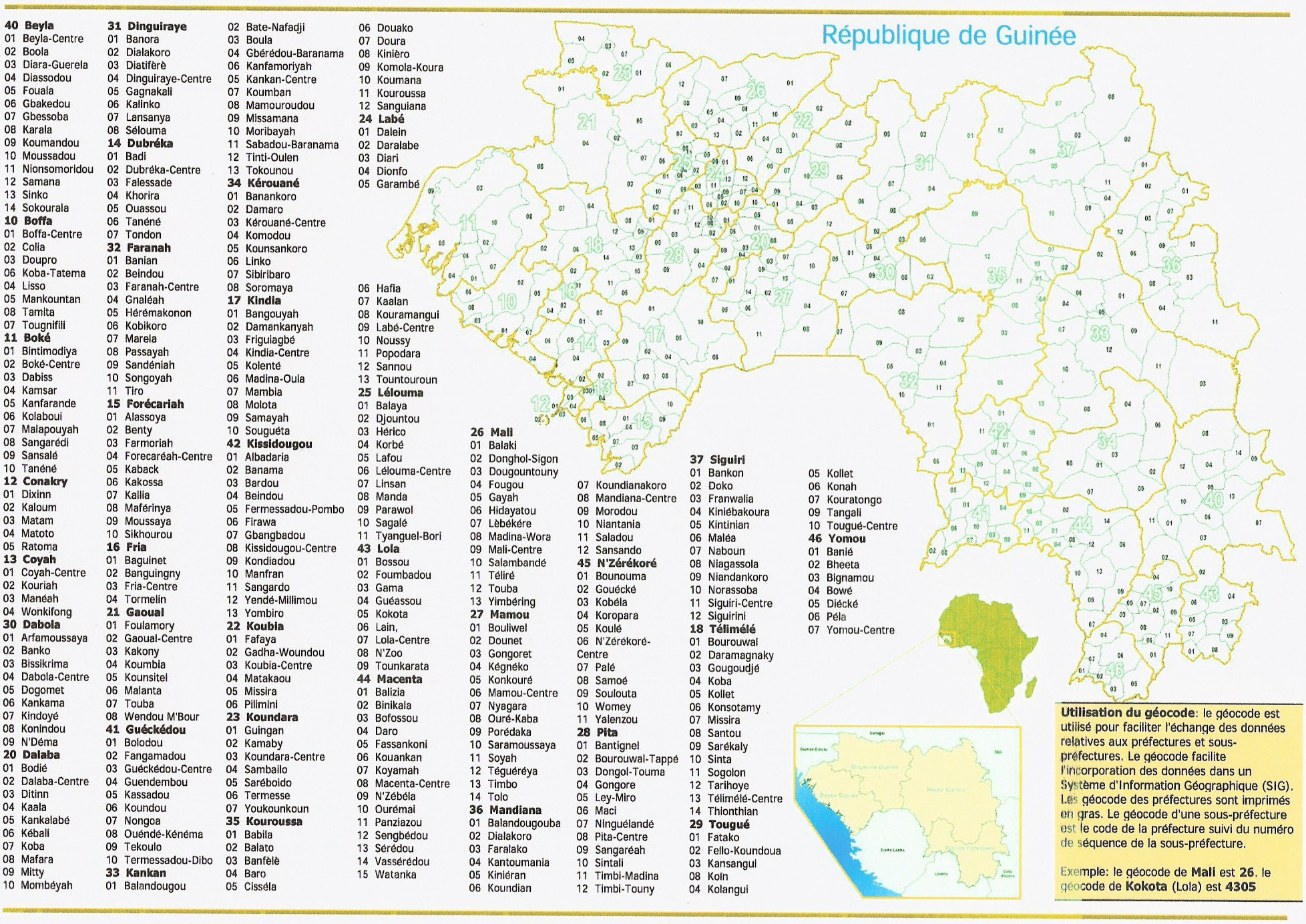

== See also ==
- Geography of Guinea
- List of regions of Guinea by Human Development Index
