= Languages of Guinea =

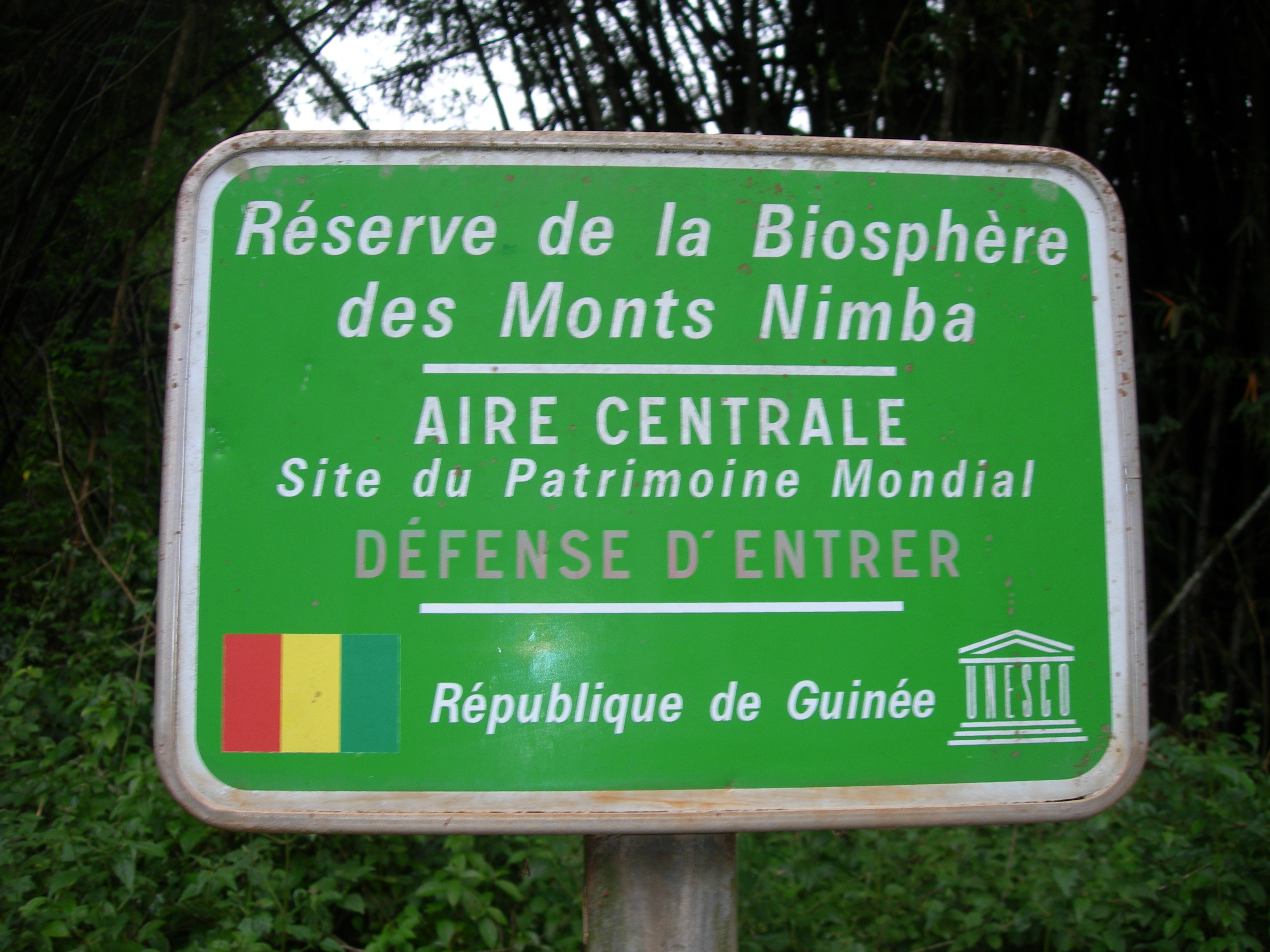
- Sign in French at Mount Nimba Strict Nature Reserve
- Official: French
- National: Fula, Maninka, Susu, Kissi, Kpelle (also known in French as Guerzé), Loma
- Vernacular: African French
- Foreign: English
- Signed: American Sign Language (Francophone African Sign Language)
- Keyboard layout: French AZERTY
- interethnic: French, Fula

The Republic of Guinea is a multilingual country, with over 40 languages spoken. According to the most recent constitution of September 2025, the official languages are the local languages as well as French, while after the colonialization it was French only. The working language remains French. Seven indigenous languages have been given the status of national languages after the independence from France in 1958: Fula, Pular, Malinké (or Maninka); Susu; Kissi; Kpelle (also known in French as Guerzé) and Loma. Implementing the local African N'Ko and Adlam scripts is promoted by law since 2026.

Guinea is a Francophone country, where, as of 2024, 4.11 million (27.83%) out of 14.76 million people speak French.

== Government and institutions ==
At the end of the Ahmed Sékou Touré regime, French became the only language used in business and schools. French is now the language of state and of official institutions despite being used as a second language by 15% to 25% of the population, and as a first language by a negligible portion of the population.

== By region ==
Fula (34.6%) is mostly spoken in Middle Guinea, where the major city is Labé. It dominates in the Labé and Mamou regions where it is spoken by 94.5% and 92.4% of the populations respectively.

Malinké (24.9%) is mostly spoken in Upper Guinea, where Kankan is the major city. It dominates the Kankan Region where it is spoken by 87.1% of the population. The Kankan variety of the language was used by Solomana Kante for the development of N'Ko, a standardized unified written Manding language, which is increasingly used in literacy education and publishing books and newspapers in Guinea and neighboring countries.

Susu (17.7%) is mostly spoken in Guinée maritime, where the capital is Conakry. It dominates the Kindia Region where it is spoken by 54.9% of the population and the plurality (37%) of Conakry also speaks it.

Koniaka (4.5%), Kissi (4.1%) and Kpelle (4%) are spoken in Guinée Forestière. More specifically, Kpelle is spoken in Nzérékoré and Yomou. Kissi is spoken in Guéckédou and Kissidougou. Kono is a language used in the south of Guinea, mostly in Lola.

French 70 - 80 % Local languages Susu Mandingo Fula Kissi Koniake Toma Gerze Baga ....
