= Béavogui =

Béavogui is a Guinean surname. Notable people with the surname include:

- Louis Lansana Beavogui (1923–1984), Guinean politician
- Mohamed Béavogui (born 1953), Guinean politician
