= List of cities in Guinea =

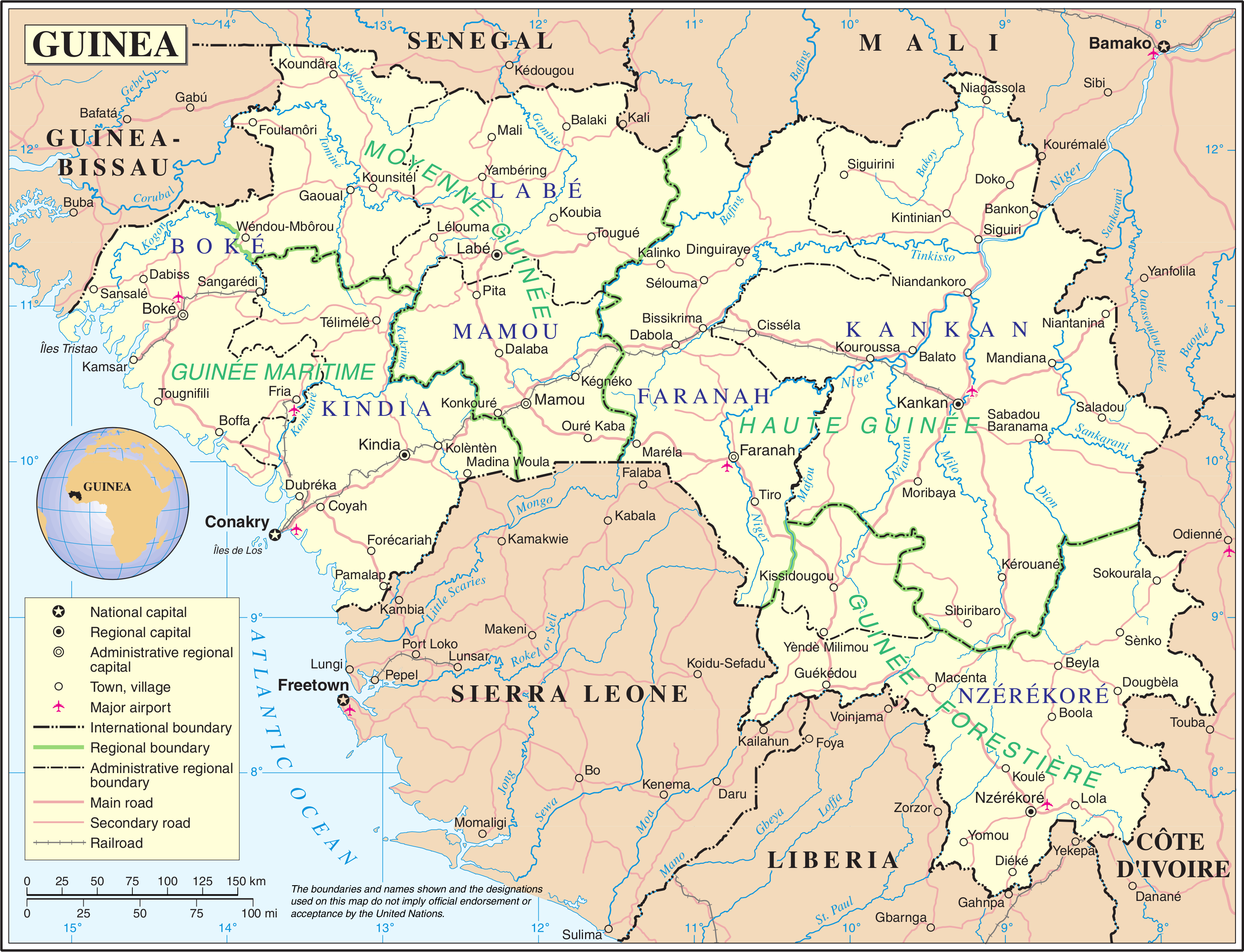
A map of Guinea

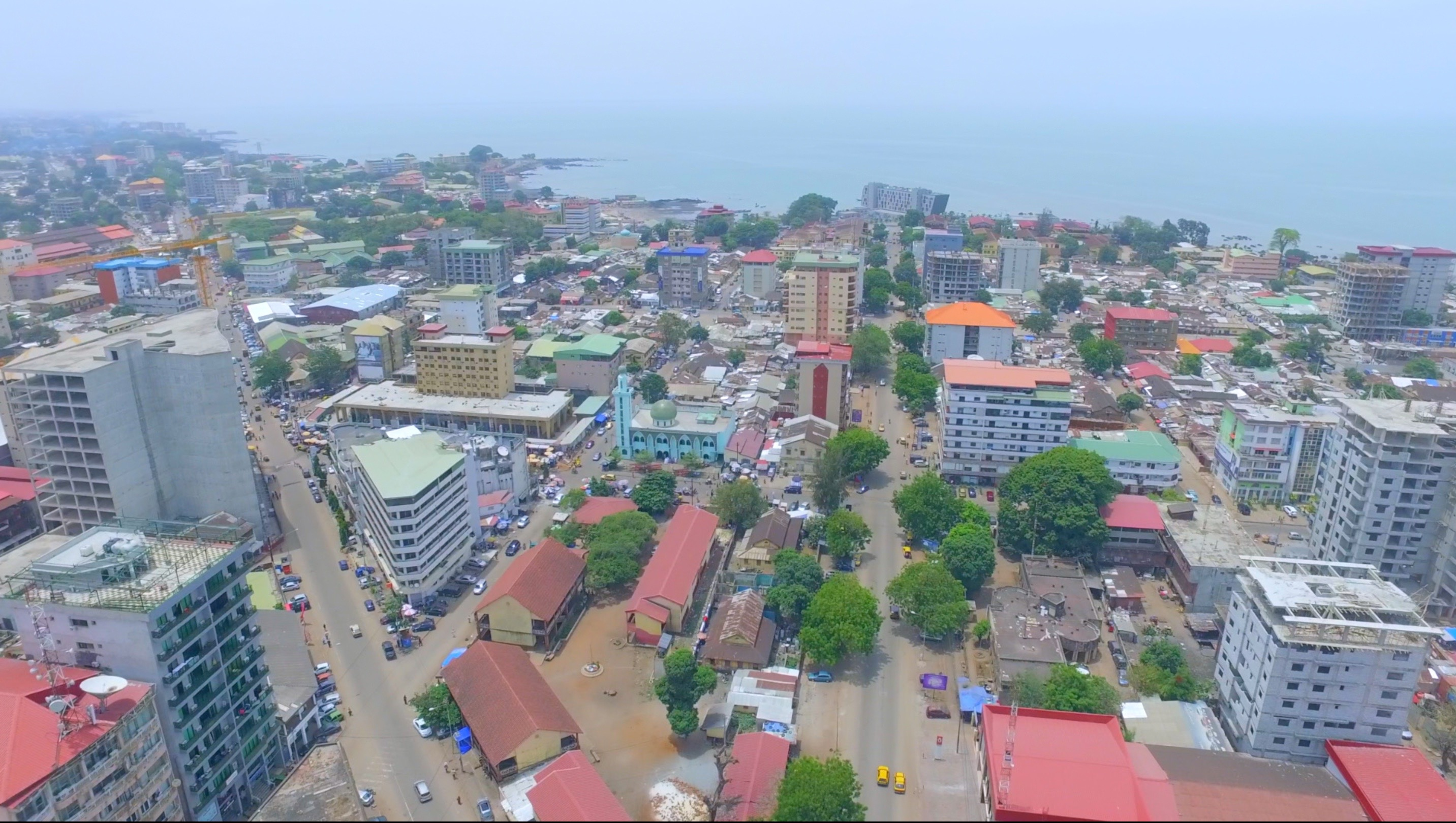
Conakry, Guinea's capital city.

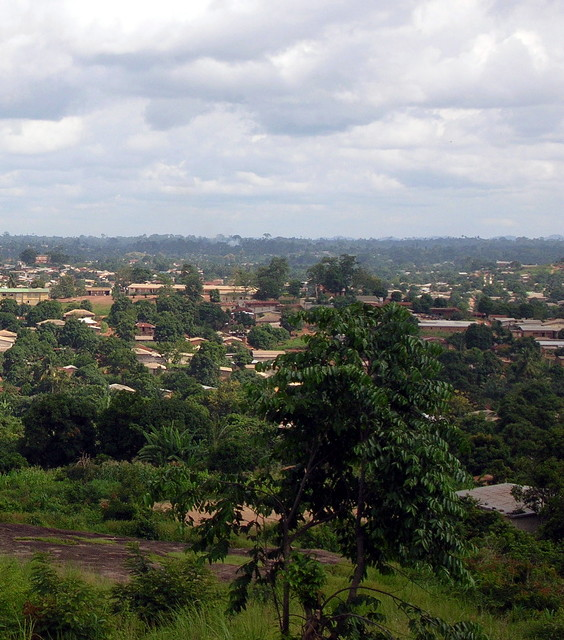
Nzérékoré.

This is a list of cities and towns in Guinea.

== Cities ==
- Beyla
- Boffa
- Boké
- Conakry (capital)
- Coyah
- Dabola
- Dalaba
- Dinguiraye
- Dubréka
- Faranah
- Forécariah
- Fria
- Gaoual
- Guéckédou
- Kankan
- Kérouané
- Kindia
- Kissidougou
- Koubia
- Koundara
- Kouroussa
- Labé
- Lélouma
- Lola
- Macenta
- Mandiana
- Mali
- Mamou
- Nzérékoré
- Pita
- Siguiri
- Télimélé
- Timbo
- Tougué
- Yomou

== Top 10 most populous cities ==
Cities in Guinea
Rank	City	Population			Region
Rank	City	Census 1983	Census 1996	Census 2014	Region
1.	Conakry	710,372	1,092,631	1,660,973	Conakry
2.	Nzérékoré	44,598	107,329	195,027	Nzérékoré
3.	Kankan	55,010	100,192	190,722	Kankan
4.	Manéah	N/A	26,872	167,354	Kindia
5.	Dubréka	3,205	5,763	157,017	Boké
6.	Kindia	39,121	96,074	138,695	Kindia
7.	Siguiri	17,388	26,881	127,492	Kankan
8.	Kissidougou	30,724	66,028	99,931	Faranah
9.	Labé	23,622	49,512	92,654	Labé
10.	Kamsar	N/A	62,595	83,428	Boké

== See also ==
- Urban planning in Africa: Guinea
