= Lower Guinea =

Lower Guinea may refer to:

- Maritime Guinea, the coastal region of the Republic of Guinea.
- in biogeography, a region of coastal tropical forests stretching along the Gulf of Guinea, from Ghana through Benin, Togo, Nigeria, and Cameroon. It is separated from Upper Guinea by the drier Dahomey Gap.

== See also ==
- Lower Guinean forests
- Middle Guinea, like Maritime Guinea a region of the Republic of Guinea
- Upper Guinea
