= Footi =

Lafidi (also known as lafidi and marawoulengni) is a vegetable and tomato sauce from Guinea (Guinean cuisine). It is also eaten in Senegalese cuisine.
