= List of regions of Guinea by Human Development Index =

This is a list of regions of Guinea by Human Development Index as of 2025 with data for the year 2023.

Rank	Region	HDI (2023)
Medium human development
1	Conakry	0.697
Low human development
–	Guinea (average)	0.500
2	Kindia Region	0.493
3	Nzérékoré Region	0.485
4	Boké Region	0.474
5	Mamou Region	0.464
6	Faranah Region	0.435
7	Labé Region	0.430
8	Kankan Region	0.421

== See also ==
- List of countries by Human Development Index
