= Dubréka =

- Sub-prefecture and town
- Location in Guinea
- Coordinates: 9°47′N 13°31′W
- Country: Guinea
- Region: Kindia Region

Government
  - Mayor: Elhadj Alseny Bangoura

Population (2008 est.)
  - Total: 8,300

Dubréka is a town in Guinea, lying immediately north of Conakry. Population 205,899 (2025 census).

== Overview ==
As the birthplace of president Lansana Conté, it has a good infrastructure and is also known for its mangrove swamps.

== Transport ==
It has a station on a 1000mm gauge railway that carries bauxite from Fria.
