= Regions of Guinea =

Guinea is divided into 8 administrative regions. 7 regions other than Conakry Region are further subdivided into 33 prefectures.

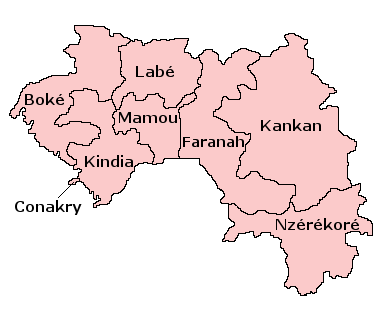
A clickable map of Guinea exhibiting its eight administrative regions.

Region	Capital	Zone	Prefectures	Sub- Prefectures	Area (km^{2})	Population (2025 census)
Boké	Boké	West	5	37	31,186	1,628,656
Conakry	n/a (Note: Conakry is the national capital and a region in itself; see Conakry § Government and administration.)	West	n/a	5	450	3,407,327
Faranah	Faranah	East	4	42	35,581	1,460,931
Kankan	Kankan	East	5	57	72,145	4,110,215
Kindia	Kindia	West	5	45	28,873	2,275,620
Labé	Labé	Central	5	53	22,869	1,239,897
Mamou	Mamou	Central	3	36	17,074	916,535
Nzérékoré	Nzérékoré	East	6	66	37,658	2,481,986

== See also ==
- Administrative divisions of Guinea
- Prefectures of Guinea
- Sub-prefectures of Guinea
- ISO 3166-2:GN
