= Upper Guinea =

Upper Guinea is a geographical term used in several contexts:

1. Upper Guinea (French: Haute-Guinée) is one of the four geographic regions of the Republic of Guinea, being east of Futa Jalon, north of Forest Guinea, and bordering Mali. The population of this region is mainly Malinke.
2. In a larger sense, it refers to a large plain covering eastern Guinea, Sierra Leone, Liberia and extending into north western Côte d'Ivoire. Mostly forming the upper watershed of the River Niger, it is sparsely populated and is home to the Haut Niger National Park.
3. Upper Guinea can also refer to the interior part of the wider Guinea region, bordering the Sahel. The interior regions are largely defined by the watersheds of rivers that arise from Fouta Djallon, including the Niger, Senegal, Faleme and others. The term was widely applied during the sixteenth to nineteenth centuries to describe a coastal region and its related hinterland with which Europeans traded.
4. In biogeography, Upper Guinea refers the region of tropical rainforest extending from southwestern Guinea through Sierra Leone, Liberia, southeastern Guinea, Côte d'Ivoire, and southwestern Ghana. The Dahomey Gap, a drier region of Ghana, Togo, and Benin where the Guinean forest-savanna mosaic extends to the Gulf of Guinea, separates Upper Guinea from the tropical rainforests of Lower Guinea further east. The Upper Guinea forests are also recognized as an endemic bird area.

== See also ==
- Upper Guinean forests
- Lower Guinea
- Middle Guinea
- Phytochorion
