= Middle Guinea =

Region of Guinea roughly corresponding to the Fouta Djallon highlands

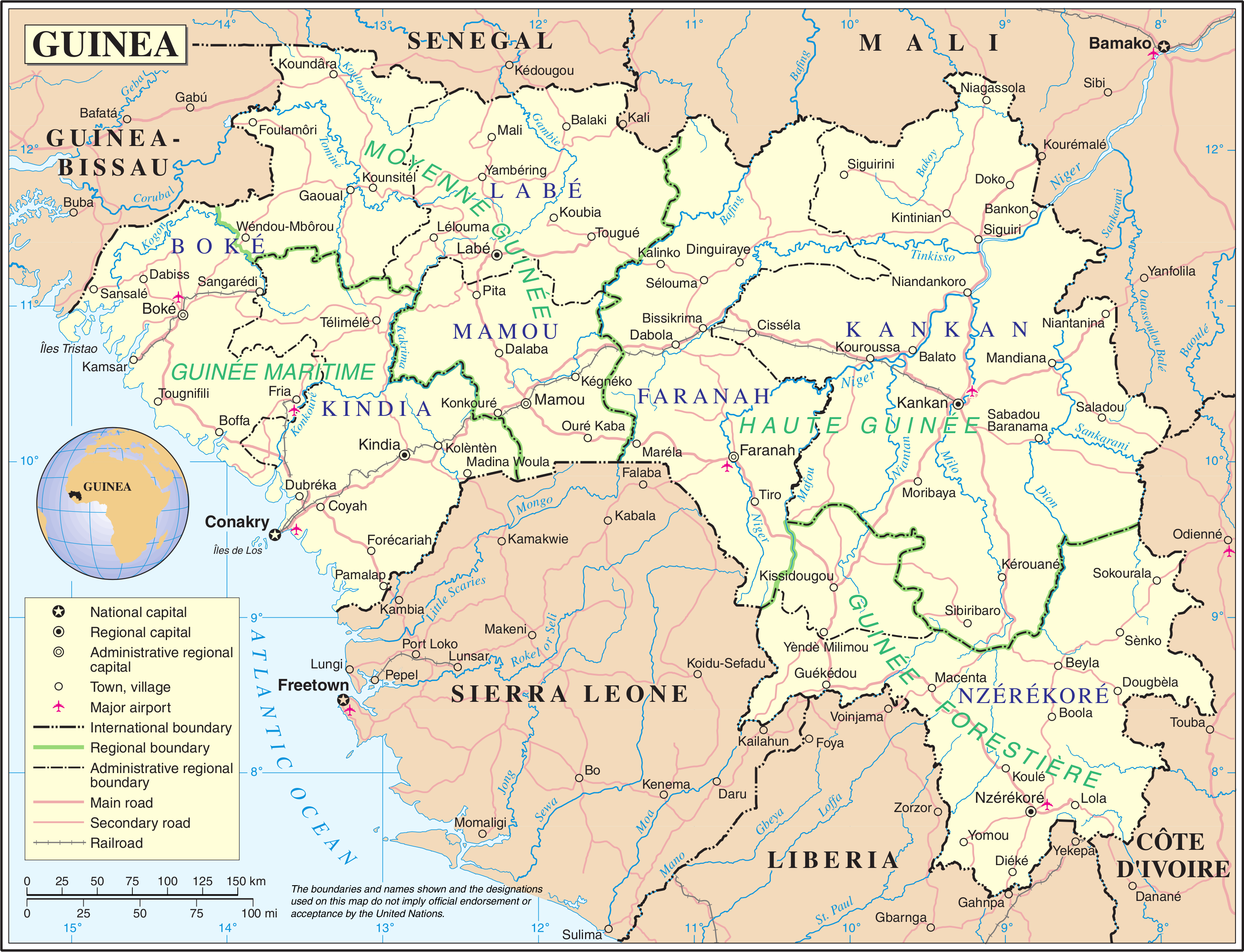
Guinea's natural regions of Maritime, Middle, Upper, and Forested.

Middle Guinea (French: Moyenne-Guinée) refers to a region in central Guinea, corresponding roughly with the plateau region known as Futa Jalon (French: Fouta Djallon; Fula: Fuuta Jaloo).

It is bounded by Maritime Guinea, also known as Lower Guinea, to the west, Guinea Bissau to the northwest, Senegal to the north, Upper Guinea to the east, and Sierra Leone to the south.

== See also ==
- Lower Guinea
- Upper Guinea
