= Guinea =

Country in West Africa

Republic of Guinea
République de Guinée (French)
(in other spoken languages)
Eastern Maninkakan	ߖߌ߬ߣߍ߫ ߞߊ ߝߊߛߏߖߊߡߊߣߊ
Pular	𞤖𞤢𞤱𞤼𞤢𞥄𞤲𞤣𞤭 𞤘𞤭𞤲𞤫
- Flag Coat of arms
- Motto: "Travail, Justice, Solidarité" (French) Work, Justice, Solidarity
- Anthem: Liberté (French) "Liberty"
- Capital and largest city: Conakry; 9°31′N 13°42′W
- Official languages: Susu; Fulani; Malinke; Kissi; Kpelle; Toma; Landuma; Uanian; French
- Spoken languages: List: Guinea-Creole; English; French; Arabic; Portuguese; Fula; Malinké; (N'Ko); Susu; Kissi; Kpelle; Toma; Badyara; Baga; Bambara; Bassari; Dan; Dyula; Landoma; Limba; Maninka; Mano; Pular; Sua; Wamey; Yalunka; Zialo
- Ethnic groups (2018 est.): 43.4% Fulani; 25.4% Mandinka; 17.2% Susu; 7.8% Kpelle; 6.2% Kissi; 1.6% Loma; 0.4% others
- Religion (2022): 89.1% Islam; 6.8% Christianity; 1.6% animism; 0.1% other; 2.4% none
- Demonym: Guinean
- Government: Unitary presidential republic
  - President: Mamadi Doumbouya
  - Prime Minister: Bah Oury
  - Speaker of Parliament: Dansa Kourouma
  - Speaker of Supreme Court: Fodé Bangoura
- Legislature: Parliament
  - Upper house: Senate
  - Lower house: National Assembly

Independence from France
  - French Guinea: 1891–1958
  - 1958 constitutional referendum: 28 September 1958
  - Independence: 2 October 1958
  - First constitution: November 10 1958
  - First military coup: 3 April 1984
  - Second military coup: 23 December 2008
  - Third military coup: 5 September 2021
  - Current constitution: 21 September 2025

Area
  - Total: 245,857 km^{2} (94,926 sq mi) (77th)
  - Water (%): negligible

Population
  - 2025 census: ▲17,521,167
  - Density: 71.3/km^{2} (184.7/sq mi) (164th)
- GDP (PPP): 2025 estimate
  - Total: ▲$75.050 billion (111th)
  - Per capita: ▲$4,075 (155th)
- GDP (nominal): 2025 estimate
  - Total: ▲$30.090 billion (110th)
  - Per capita: ▲$1,670 (151st)
- Gini (2018): ▼29.6 low inequality
- HDI (2023): ▲0.500 low (181st)
- Currency: Guinean franc (GNF)
- Time zone: UTC±00:00 (GMT)
- Calling code: +224
- ISO 3166 code: GN
- Internet TLD: .gn

Guinea, (Note: /ˈɡɪni/ GHIN-ee, French: Guinée, Pular: 𞤘𞤭𞤲𞤫, romanised: Gine, Wolof: Gine, N'Ko: ߖߌ߬ߣߍ߫, Bambara: Gine) officially the Republic of Guinea, (Note: French: République de Guinée) is a coastal country located in West Africa. It borders the Atlantic Ocean to the west, Guinea-Bissau to the northwest, Senegal to the north, Mali to the northeast, Ivory Coast to the southeast, and Sierra Leone and Liberia to the south. It is sometimes referred to as Guinea-Conakry, after its capital Conakry, to distinguish it from other territories in the eponymous region, such as Guinea-Bissau and Equatorial Guinea. At the census held on 1 July 2025, Guinea had a population of over 17.5 million and an area of 245,857 square kilometres (94,926 sq mi).

Formerly French Guinea, it achieved independence in October 2, 1958. Guinea has a history of military coups d'état. After decades of authoritarian rule, it held its first democratic election in 2010. As it continued to hold multi-party elections, the country still faces ethnic conflicts, corruption, and abuses by the military and police. In 2011, the United States government claimed that torture by security forces and abuse of women and children (including female genital mutilation) were ongoing human rights issues. In 2021, a military faction overthrew president Alpha Condé and suspended the constitution.

Guinea is a member of United Nations, ECOWAS, South Atlantic Peace and Cooperation Zone, Organisation of Islamic Cooperation, La Francophonie, and African Union. Its membership in the African Union was suspended in 2021 because of the 2021 coup, but it was reinstated in January 2026. Muslims represent 90% of the population. The country is divided into four geographic regions: Maritime Guinea on the Atlantic coast, the Fouta Djallon or Middle Guinea highlands, the Upper Guinea savannah region in the northeast, and the Guinée forestière region of tropical forests. More than 24 indigenous languages are spoken, and the largest are Susu, Pular, and Maninka, which dominate respectively in Maritime Guinea, Fouta Djallon, and Upper Guinea, while Forest Guinea is ethnolinguistically diverse. Despite that, French only is the language of communication in schools, government administration, and the media. Guinea's economy is mostly dependent on agriculture and mineral production. It is the world's second-largest producer of bauxite and has deposits of diamonds and gold. As of the most recent survey in 2018, 66.2% of the population is affected by multidimensional poverty, and an additional 16.4% are vulnerable to it.

== Name ==
Guinea is named after the Guinea region, which lies along the Gulf of Guinea. It stretches north through the forested tropical regions and ends at the Sahel. The English term "Guinea" comes directly from the Portuguese word Guiné which emerged in the mid-15th century to refer to the lands inhabited by the Guineus, a generic term for the African peoples south of the Senegal River, in contrast to the "tawny" Zenaga Berbers above it, whom they called Azengues or Moors.

In 1978, the official name became the "People's Revolutionary Republic of Guinea". In 1984, the country was renamed the "Republic of Guinea" after the death of the first president, Ahmed Sékou Touré.

== History ==
The land that is now Guinea either bordered or was situated within a series of historic African empires before the French arrived in the 1890s and claimed the terrain as part of colonial French West Africa. Guinea declared independence from France on 2 October 1958. From independence until the presidential election of 2010, Guinea was governed by multiple autocratic rulers.

=== West African empires and kingdoms ===
What is now Guinea sat on the fringes of various West African empires. The earliest, the Ghana Empire, grew on trade and ultimately fell after repeated incursions of the Almoravids. It was in this period that Islam first arrived in the region by way of North African traders. The Sosso Empire came and stayed from the 12th to 13th centuries; later, the Mali Empire came when Soundiata Kéïta defeated the Sosso ruler Soumangourou Kanté at the Battle of Kirina in c. 1235. The Mali Empire was ruled by Mansa (Emperors), including Kankou Moussa, who made a hajj to Mecca in 1324. After his reign, the Mali Empire began to decline and was ultimately supplanted by its vassal states in the 15th century.

The Songhai Empire expanded its power in about 1460. It continued to prosper until a civil war, over succession, followed the death of Askia Daoud in 1582. The empire fell to invaders from Morocco in 1591, but the kingdom later split into smaller kingdoms. After the fall of some of the West African empires, various kingdoms existed in what is now Guinea. Fulani Muslims migrated to Futa Jallon in Central Guinea, and established an Islamic state from 1727 to 1896 with a written constitution and alternate rulers. The Wassoulou Empire (1878–1898) was led by Samori Toure in the predominantly Malinké area of what is now upper Guinea and southwestern Mali. It moved to Ivory Coast before being occupied by the French.

=== Colony ===
European traders competed for the Cape trade from the 17th century onward and made inroads earlier. Guinea's colonial period began with French military penetration into the area, and its establishment as a colony on 17 December 1891. As a result of various troubles, France occupied Timbo, the capital of Fouta, in 1896, and a definitive treaty was signed in 1897. The defeat of the armies of Samori Touré, Mansa (or Emperor) of the Ouassoulou state and leader of Malinké descent, in 1898 gave France control of what today is Guinea and adjacent areas. The boundaries of the South Rivers were fixed in 1899.

France negotiated Guinea's present boundaries in the late 19th and early 20th centuries with the British for Sierra Leone, the Portuguese for their Guinea colony (now Guinea-Bissau), and Liberia. Under the French, the country formed the Territory of Guinea within French West Africa, administered by a governor general resident in Dakar. Lieutenant governors administered the individual colonies, including Guinea.

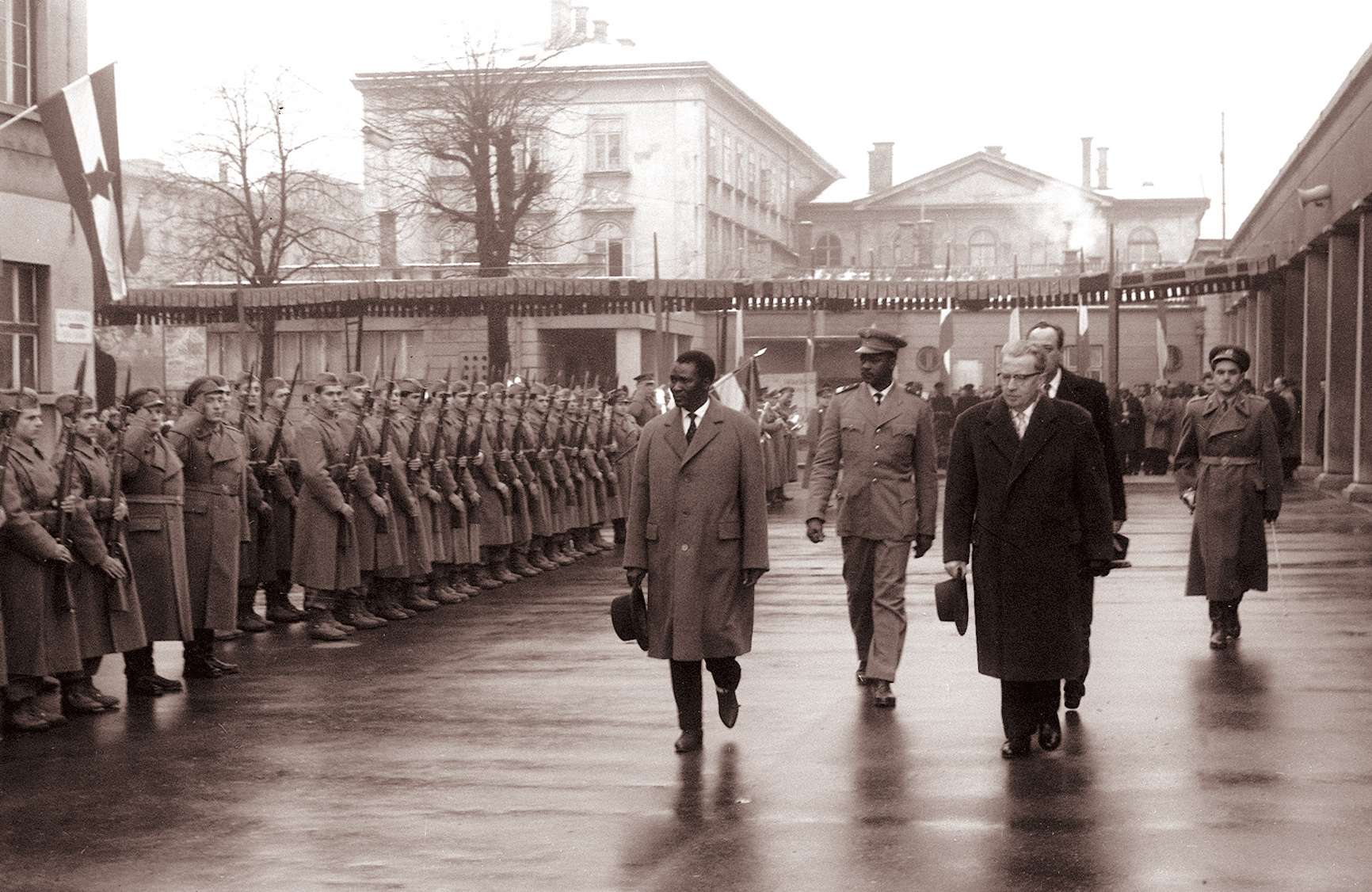
President Ahmed Sékou Touré was supported by Communist states and, in 1961, visited Yugoslavia.

=== Independence ===
In 1958, the French Fourth Republic collapsed due to political instability and its failures in dealing with its colonies, especially Indochina and Algeria. The French Fifth Republic gave the colonies the choice of autonomy in a new French Community or immediate independence in the referendum of 28 September 1958. Guinea voted overwhelmingly for independence. Guinean women were an integral part of influencing the nation to become liberated from the French and be a sovereign state. Guinean women were a part of social justice organizations and protested against poor living conditions with demands to live comfortably and freely with a promise for a better future. The movement for freedom brought together women of all education levels including illiterate women who organized strikes such as sexual strikes to encourage their men to vote for the political party that favoured independence. There were even all women military forces with Mafory Bangoura emerging as an iconic figure in favour of independence. The political party for independence was led by Ahmed Sékou Touré, whose Democratic Party of Guinea-African Democratic Rally (PDG) had won 56 of 60 seats in the 1957 territorial elections.

The French later withdrew, and on 2 October 1958, Guinea proclaimed itself a sovereign and independent republic, with Sékou Touré as president. Later, Opération Persil was planned by Jacques Foccart; they planned to create large quantities of forged Guinean francs to hyperinflate Guinea's economy and to arm Touré's opposition figures. However, the operation was leaked, and soon, the Guinean was issuing a number of official complaints.

=== Post-colonial ===
==== Under Touré's rule ====
In 1960, Touré declared the Democratic Party of Guinea the country's only legal political party, and for the next 24 years, the government and PDG were one. Touré was re-elected unopposed to four 7-year terms as president, and every 5 years voters were presented with a single list of PDG candidates for the National Assembly.

On 22 November 1970, Portuguese forces from neighbouring Portuguese Guinea staged Operation Green Sea, a raid on Conakry by several hundred exiled Guinean opposition forces. Among their goals, the Portuguese military wanted to kill or capture Sekou Touré due to his support of PAIGC, an independence movement and rebel group that had carried out attacks inside Portuguese Guinea from their bases in Guinea. After some fighting, the Portuguese-backed forces retreated. Guinea was elected as a non-permanent member of the UN Security Council 1972–73.

In 1977, a declining economy and a ban on all private economic transactions led to the Market Women's Revolt, a series of anti-government riots started by women working in Conakry's Madina Market. Touré vacillated from supporting the Soviet Union to supporting the United States. The late 1970s and early 1980s saw some economic reforms. After the election of Valéry Giscard d'Estaing as French president, trade increased and the two countries exchanged diplomatic visits.

==== Under Conté's rule ====
Sékou Touré died on 26 March 1984 after a heart operation in the United States, and was replaced by Prime Minister Louis Lansana Beavogui, who was to serve as interim president, pending new elections. PDG was due to elect a new leader on 3 April 1984. Under the constitution, that person would have been the only candidate for president. Hours before that meeting, Colonels Lansana Conté and Diarra Traoré seized power in a bloodless coup. Conté assumed the role of president, with Traoré serving as prime minister, until December.

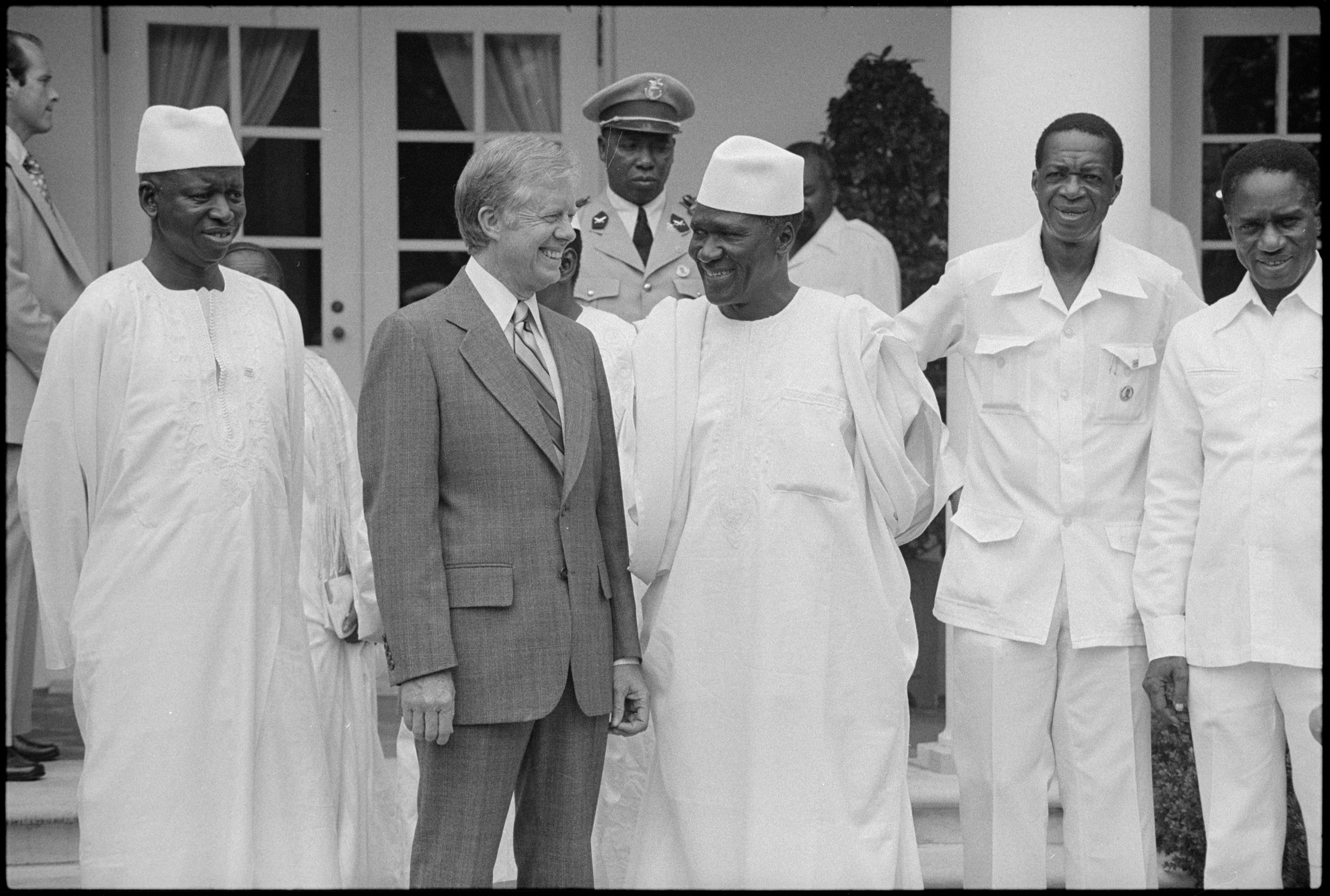
U.S. President Jimmy Carter welcoming Ahmed Sékou Touré outside the White House, Washington, D.C., 1979

Conté denounced the previous regime's record on human rights, releasing 250 political prisoners and encouraging approximately 200,000 more to return from exile. He made explicit the turn away from socialism. In 1992, Conté announced a return to civilian rule, with a presidential poll in 1993, followed by elections to parliament in 1995 (in which his party—the Party of Unity and Progress—won 71 of 114 seats). In September 2001, the opposition leader Alpha Condé was imprisoned for endangering state security and pardoned 8 months later. Subsequently, he spent time in exile in France.

In 2001, Conté organised and won a referendum to lengthen the presidential term, and in 2003, he began his third term after elections were boycotted by the opposition. In January 2005, Conté survived a suspected assassination attempt while making a public appearance in Conakry. His opponents claimed that he was a "tired dictator", whose departure was inevitable, whereas his supporters believed that he was winning a battle with dissidents. According to Foreign Policy, Guinea was in danger of becoming a failed state.

In 2000, Guinea suffered as rebels crossed the borders from Liberia and Sierra Leone. Some thought that the country was headed towards a civil war. Conté blamed neighbouring leaders for coveting Guinea's natural resources, and these claims were denied. In 2003, Guinea agreed to plans with her neighbours to tackle the insurgents. The 2007 Guinean general strike resulted in the appointment of a new prime minister.

==== Political violence and Ebola outbreak ====
Conté remained in power until his death on 23 December 2008. Several hours after his death, Moussa Dadis Camara seized control in a coup, declaring himself head of a military junta. Protests against the coup became violent, and 157 people were killed when, on 28 September 2009, the junta ordered its soldiers to attack people gathered to protest Camara's attempt to become president. The soldiers went on a rampage of rape, mutilation, and murder, which caused some foreign governments to withdraw their support for the new regime.

On 3 December 2009, an aide shot Camara during a dispute over the rampage in September. Camara went to Morocco for medical care. Vice-president (and defence minister) Sékouba Konaté flew from Lebanon to run the country. After meeting in Ouagadougou on 13 and 14 January 2010, Camara, Konaté, and Blaise Compaoré, President of Burkina Faso, produced a formal statement of 12 principles promising a return of Guinea to civilian rule within six months. The presidential election of 27 June brought allegations of fraud, and a second election was held on 7 November. Voter turnout was "high", and the elections went "relatively smoothly". Alpha Condé, leader of the opposition party Rally of the Guinean People (RGP), won the election, promising to reform the security sector and review mining contracts.

In February 2013, political violence erupted after street protests over the transparency of the upcoming May elections. The protests were fuelled by the opposition coalition's decision to step down from the elections in protest of the lack of transparency in the preparations for the elections. Nine people were killed during the protests, and around 220 were injured. Some deaths and injuries were caused by security forces using live ammunition on protesters. The violence led to ethnic clashes between the Malinke and Fula, who supported and opposed President Condé, respectively. On 26 March 2013, the opposition party backed out of negotiations with the government over the election, saying that the government had not respected them, and had broken all agreements.

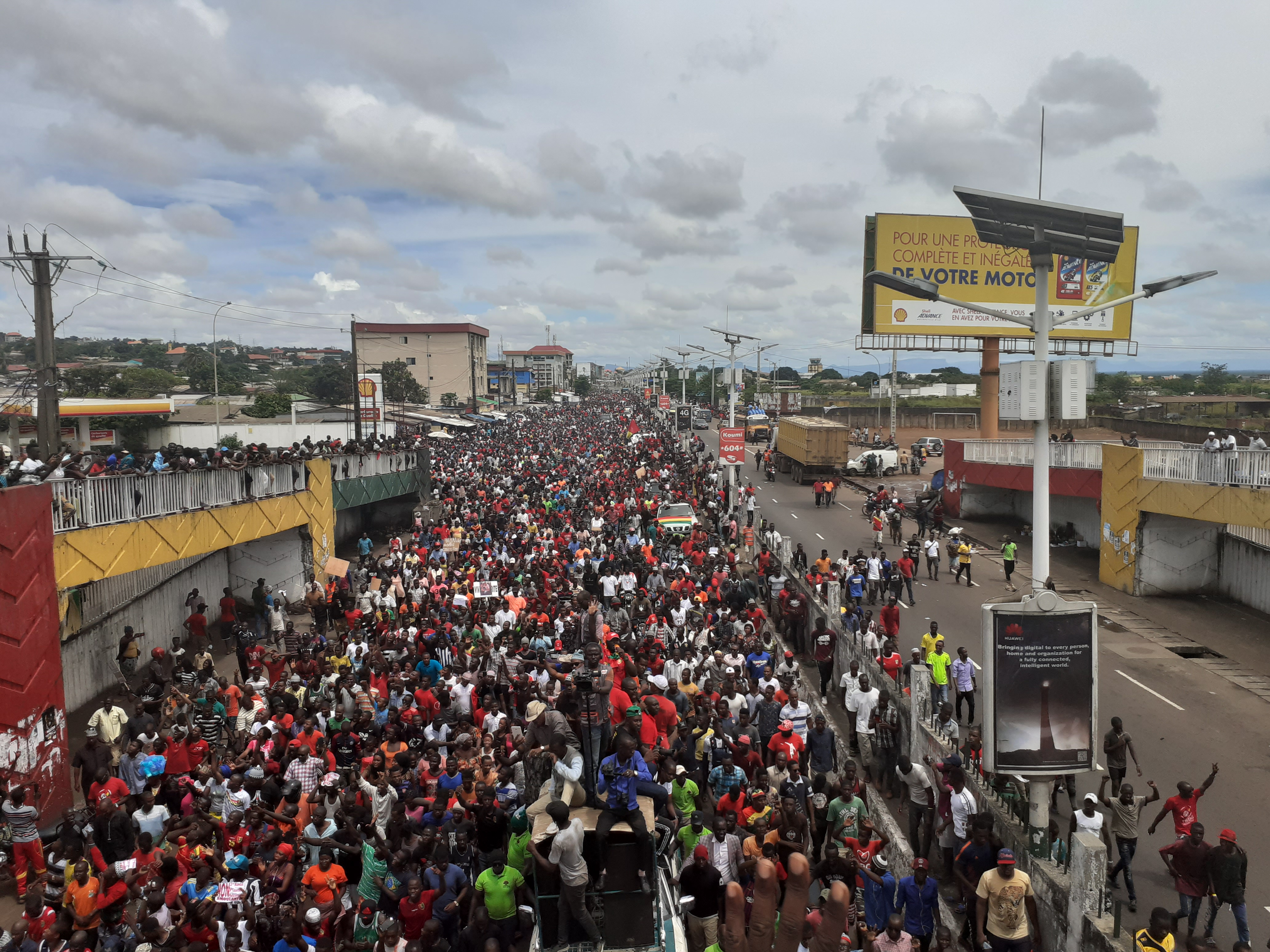
The 2019–2020 Guinean protests against the rule of Alpha Condé

On 25 March 2014, the World Health Organization stated that Guinea's Ministry of Health had reported an outbreak of Ebola virus disease in Guinea. This initial outbreak had 86 cases, including 59 deaths. By 28 May, there were 281 cases, with 186 deaths. It is believed that the first case was Emile Ouamouno, a two-year-old boy in the village of Meliandou. He fell ill on 2 December 2013 and died on 6 December. On 18 September 2014, eight members of an Ebola education health care team were murdered by villagers in the town of Womey. As of 1 November 2015, there had been 3,810 cases and 2,536 deaths in Guinea.

Mass civil unrest and violent protests broke out against the rule of Alpha Conde on 14 October 2019, against constitutional changes. More than 800 were killed in clashes. After the 2020 Guinean presidential election, Alpha Condé's election to a third term was challenged by the opposition, who accused him of fraud. Condé claimed a constitutional referendum from March 2020 allowed him to run despite the 2-term limit.

==== Under military rule ====
On 5 September 2021, after hours of gunfire near the presidential palace, Lieutenant Colonel Mamady Doumbouya seized control of state television and declared that President Alpha Conde's government had been dissolved and the nation's borders closed. By the evening, the putschists had declared control of all of Conakry and the country's armed forces. According to Guinée Matin, by 6 September, the military fully controlled the state administration and started to replace the civil administration with its military counterpart. The United Nations, European Union, African Union, ECOWAS (which suspended Guinea's membership), and La Francophonie denounced the coup, and called for President Condé's unconditional release. Similar responses came from some neighbouring and Western countries (including the United States), and from China (which relies on Guinea for half of its aluminium ore, facilitated by its connections to President Condé). Despite these, on 1 October 2021, Mamady Doumbouya was sworn in as interim president.

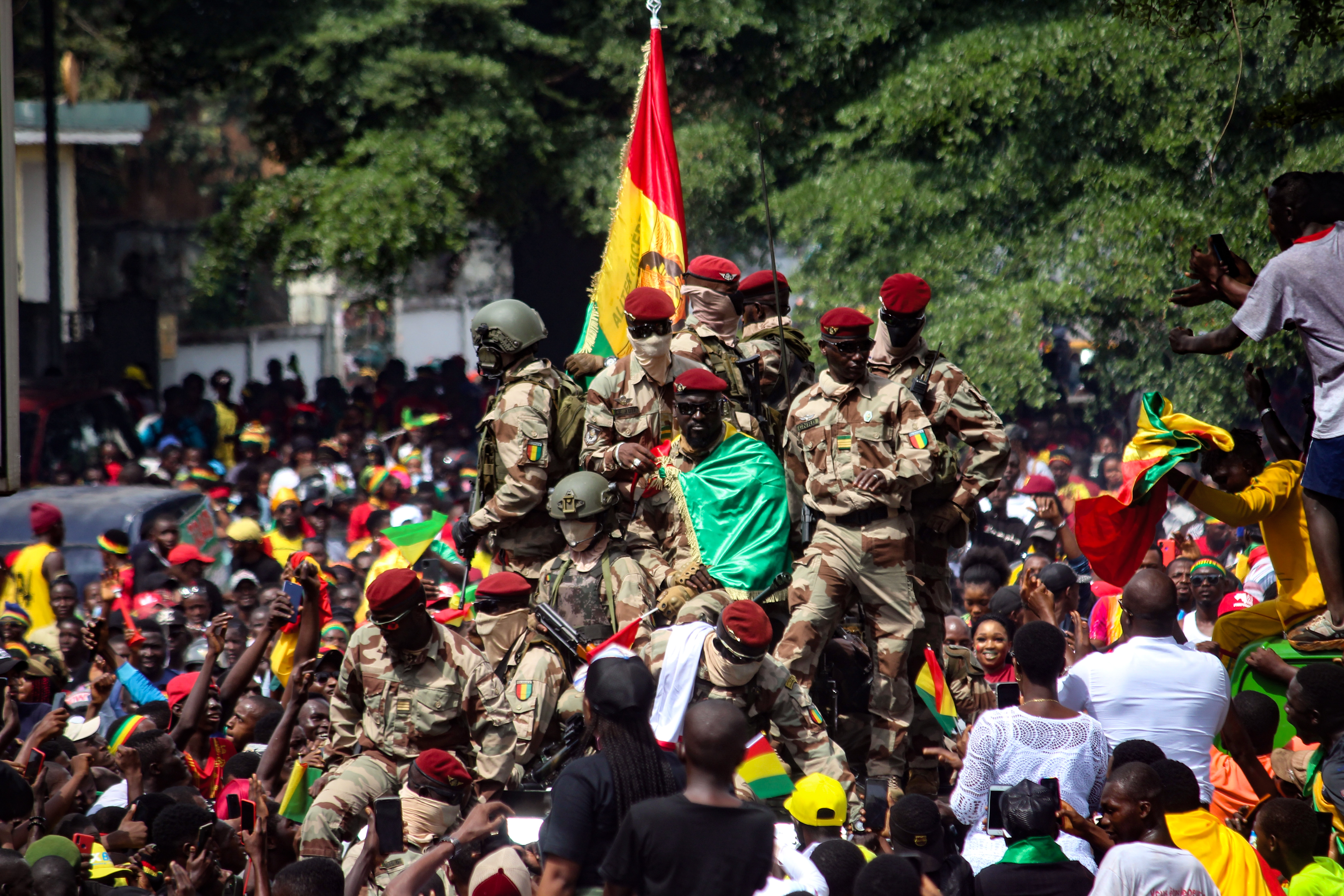
Mamadi Doumbouya attending the independence day anniversary celebrations in Guinea, 2 October 2021

On 11 May 2023, at least seven people were shot dead in anti-government demonstrations in cities across Guinea. The anti-government movement became involved in peaceful protests and called on rulers to end military rule in Guinea and transition the country to democracy. On 18 December 2023, an explosion occurred at the country's main oil depot in Conakry, killing 24 people and causing extensive fuel shortages in the country in the following weeks. Existing civil and economic unrest in the country temporarily worsened as a result, with several confrontations between protestors and police in Conakry, increased fuel and travel costs, and general price inflation throughout the country.

Doumbouya initially set 31 December 2024 as the deadline to launch a democratic transition. But he missed the deadline, leading to protests and criticism from activists and the opposition. Under pressure, he promised in his New Year’s message that a decree for the constitutional referendum would be signed. Authorities further added that all elections would be held in 2025, without initially committing to a particular date. A constitutional referendum was held on 21 September 2025, which established a new constitution replacing the one approved in 2020 and marked the first step towards civilian rule. In May 2025, a presidential election was announced for December and held on 28 December 2025.

On 28 December 2025, Guineans voted in the first election since the 2021 coup d'etat. There were 8 other candidates in the race as well as Mamady Doumbouya.

On 5 January 2026, Mamady Doumbouya’s landslide election win was validated by the Supreme Court. He had received 86.72% of the votes. Following the election, ECOWAS unsuspended Guinea.

== Geography ==
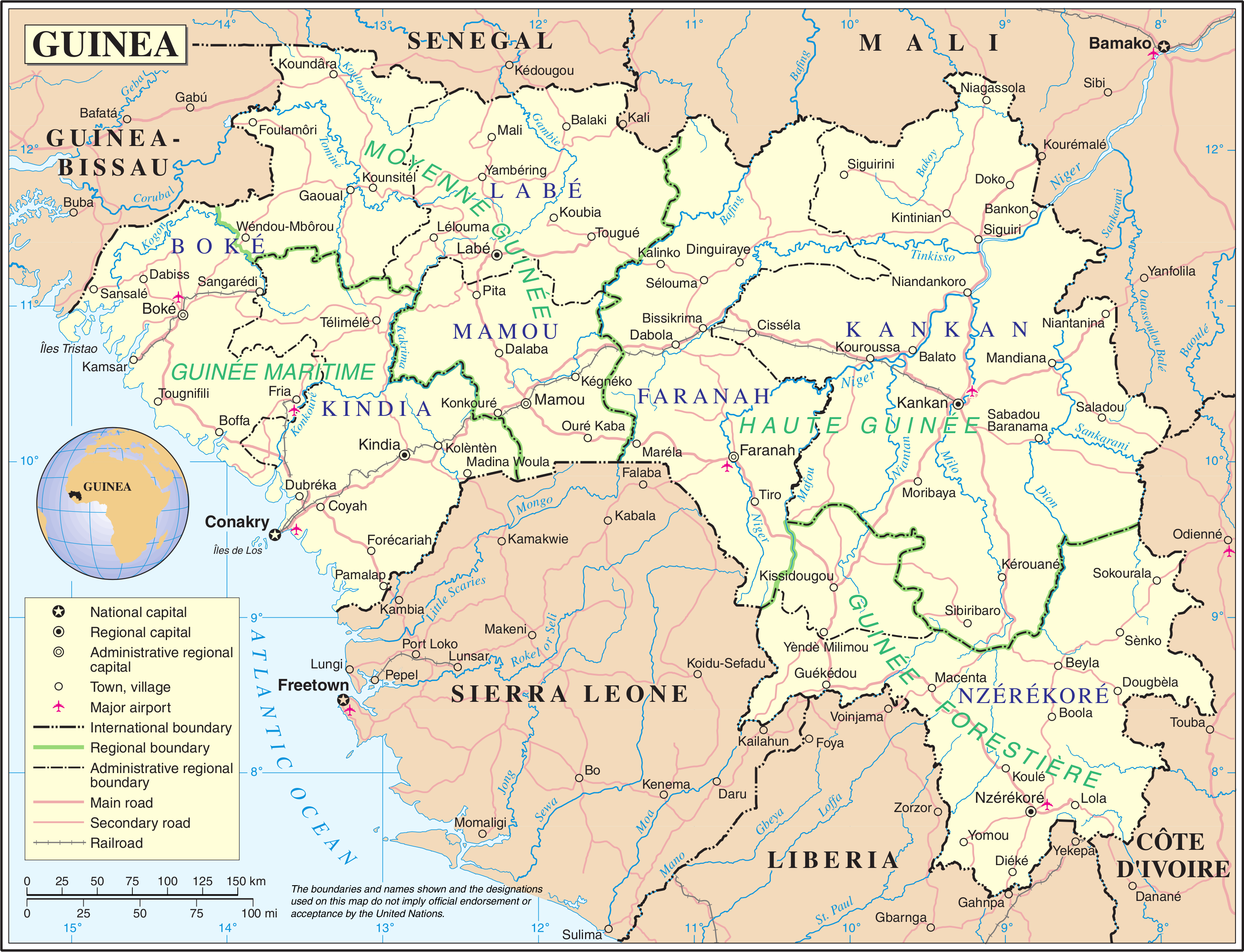
A map showing Guinea's cities and administrative divisions

Guinea shares a border with Guinea-Bissau to the northwest, Senegal to the north, Mali to the northeast, Ivory Coast to the east, Sierra Leone to the southwest and Liberia to the south. The nation forms a crescent as it curves from its southeast region to the north and west, to its northwest border with Guinea-Bissau and southwestern coast on the Atlantic Ocean. The sources of the Niger River, the Gambia River, and the Senegal River are all found in the Guinea Highlands. At 245,857 km^{2} (94,926 sq mi), Guinea is roughly the size of the United Kingdom. There are 320 km (200 mi) of coastline and a total land border of 3,400 km (2,100 mi). It lies mostly between latitudes 7° and 13°N, and longitudes 7° and 15°W, with a smaller area that is west of 15°W.

Köppen climate classification of Guinea

Guinea is divided into 4 regions: Maritime Guinea, also known as Lower Guinea or the Basse-Coté lowlands, populated mainly by the Susu ethnic group; the cooler, more mountainous Fouta Djallon that run roughly north–south through the middle of the country, populated by Fulas; the Sahelian Haute-Guinea to the northeast, populated by Malinké; and the forested jungle regions in the southeast, with several ethnic groups. Guinea's mountains are the source for the Niger, the Gambia, and Senegal Rivers, and rivers flowing to the sea on the west side of the range in Sierra Leone and Ivory Coast. The highest point in Guinea is Mount Nimba at 1,752 m (5,748 ft). While the Guinean and Ivorian sides of the Nimba Massif are a UNESCO Strict Nature Reserve, the portion of the so-called Guinean Backbone continues into Liberia, where it has been mined for decades; the damage is evident in the Nzérékoré Region at 7°32′17″N 8°29′50″W.

Guinea is home to 5 ecoregions: Guinean montane forests, Western Guinean lowland forests, Guinean forest-savannah mosaic, West Sudanian savannah, and Guinean mangroves.

=== Wildlife ===
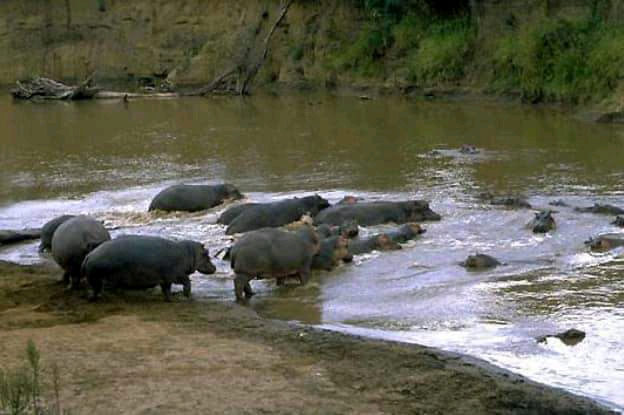
Badiar National Park

The southern part of Guinea lies within the Guinean Forests of West Africa Biodiversity hotspot, while the north-east is characterised by dry savannah woodlands. Declining populations of some animals are restricted to uninhabited distant parts of parks and reserves.

Species found in Guinea include the following:

- Amphibians: Hemisus guineensis, Phrynobatrachus guineensis
- Reptiles: Acanthodactylus guineensis, Mochlus guineensis
- Arachnids: Malloneta guineensis, Dictyna guineensis
- Insects: Zorotypus guineensis, Euchromia guineensis
- Birds: Melaniparus guineensis

=== Regions and prefectures ===
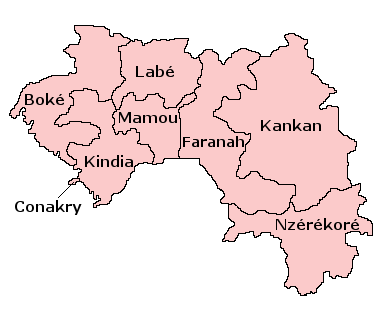
Regions of Guinea

The Republic of Guinea covers 245,857 square kilometres (94,926 sq mi) of West Africa, about 10 degrees north of the equator. It is divided into 4 natural regions:

- Maritime Guinea (La Guinée Maritime) covers 18% of the country.
- Middle Guinea (La Moyenne-Guinée) covers 20% of the country.
- Upper Guinea (La Haute-Guinée) covers 38% of the country.
- Forested Guinea (Guinée forestière) covers 23% of the country, and is both forested and mountainous.

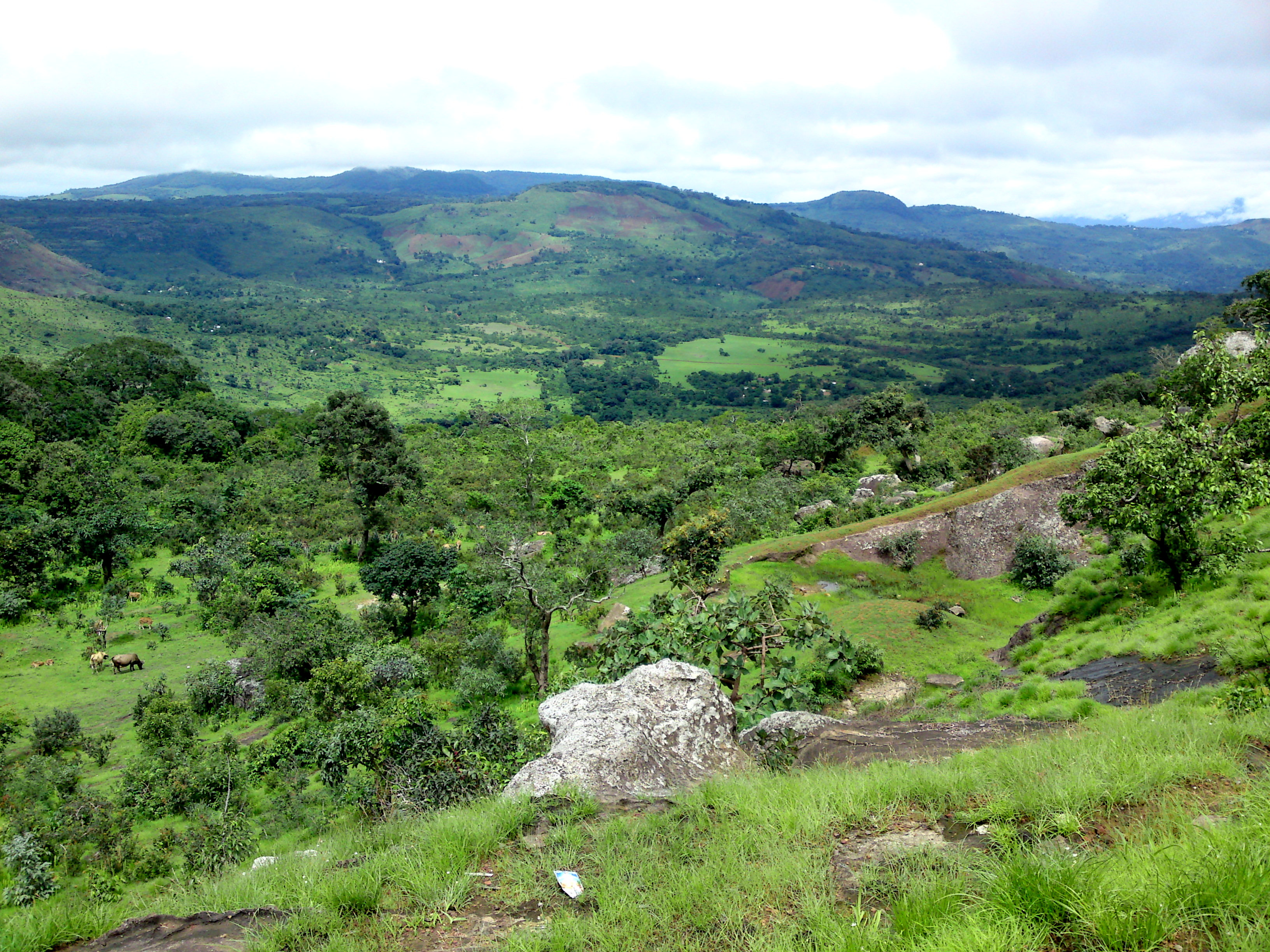
Fouta Djallon highlands in central Guinea

Guinea is divided into eight administrative regions which are subdivided into 33 prefectures. The capital Conakry with a population of 1,675,069 in 2014 ranks as a special zone; before the 2025 Census it was considerably expanded, with the transfer of about 300,000 people from the Kindia Region.

Region	Capital	Area Km^{2}	Population 2014 census	Population 2025 census
Conakry Region	Conakry	500	1,675,069	3,407,327
Nzérékoré Region	Nzérékoré	37,658	1,591,716	2,481,986
Kindia Region	Kindia	28,823	1,573,690	2,275,620
Boké Region	Boké	31,207	1,092,291	1,628,656
Labé Region	Labé	22,869	1,001,392	1,239,897
Mamou Region	Mamou	17,074	737,062	916,535
Kankan Region	Kankan	72,145	1,979,038	4,110,215
Faranah Region	Faranah	35,581	949,589	1,460,931

== Politics ==
While Guinea is a republic de jure, since the 2021 coup d'état it has been governed as a de facto military autocracy. The president is directly elected by the people and is the head of state and the head of government. The unicameral National Assembly is the legislative body of the country, and its members are directly elected by the people. The judicial branch is headed by the Supreme Court of Guinea, the highest and final court of appeal in the country. Since the 2021 coup, the National Assembly and Supreme Court have been suspended. The country has been led by special forces commander Mamady Doumbouya following the coup and an election in 2025.

The National Assembly of Guinea, the country's legislative body, did not meet from 2008 to 2013, when it was dissolved after the military coup in December. Elections have been postponed multiple times since 2007. In April 2012, President Condé postponed the elections indefinitely, citing the need to ensure that they were "transparent and democratic". The 2013 Guinean legislative election was held on 24 September. President Alpha Condé's party, the Rally of the Guinean People (RPG), won a plurality of seats in the National Assembly of Guinea, with 53 out of 114 seats. The main opposition candidate-Cellou Dalein Diallo's party, the Union of Democratic Forces of Guinea (UFDG) won 37 seats as opposition leaders denounced the official results as fraudulent.

The president of Guinea is elected by popular vote for a 5-year term; the winning candidate must receive a majority of the votes cast to be elected president. The president governs Guinea, assisted by a cabinet of 25 civilian ministers, appointed by him. The government administers the country through 8 regions, 33 prefectures, over 100 subprefectures, and districts (known as communes in Conakry and other cities and villages, or quartiers in the interior). District-level leaders are elected; the president appoints officials to all other levels of the centralised administration. Former President Alpha Condé derived support from Guinea's second-largest ethnic group, the Malinke. Guinea's opposition was backed by the Fula ethnic group, who account for around 33.4% of the population.

=== Foreign relations ===
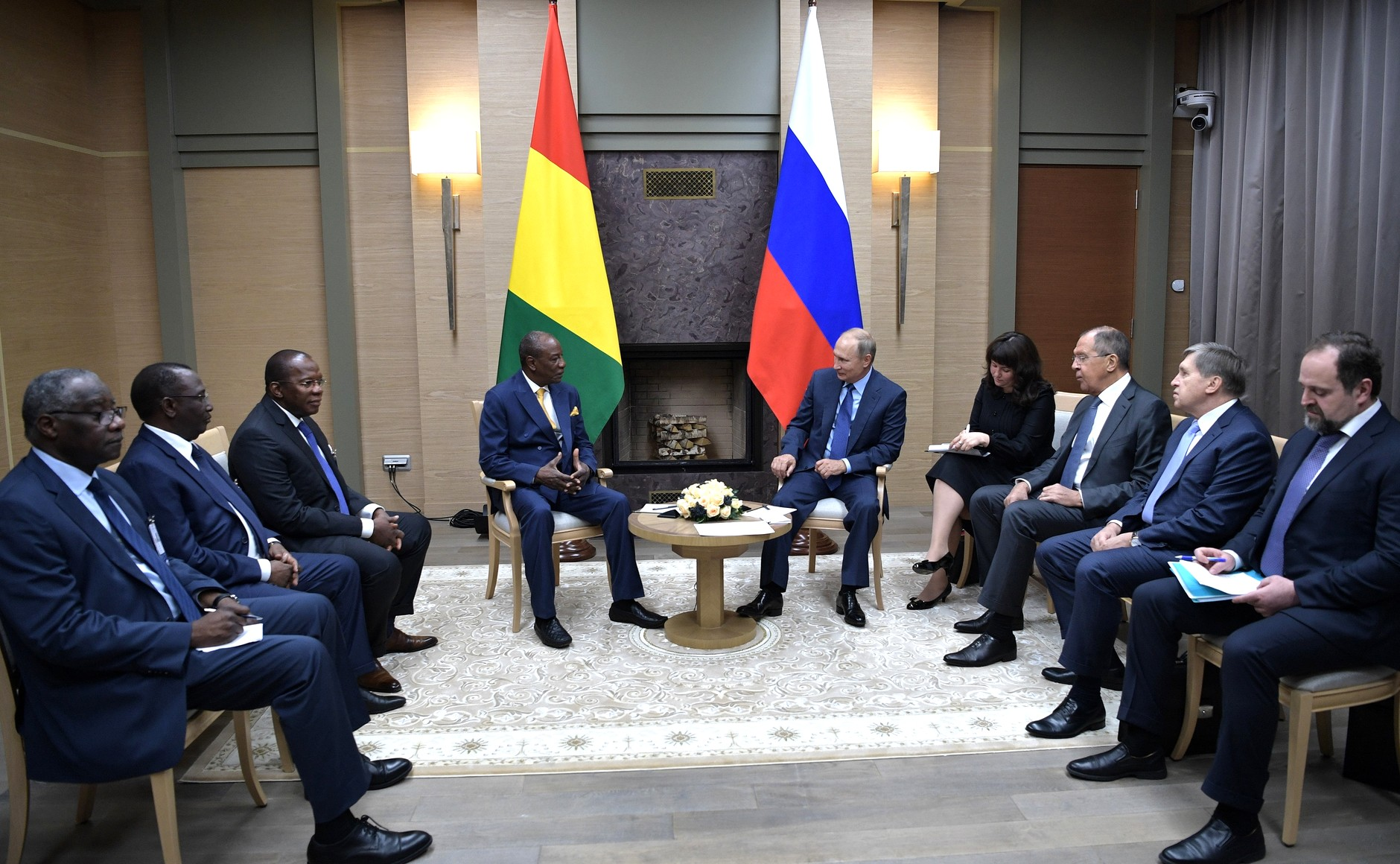
President Alpha Condé with Russian President Vladimir Putin on 28 September 2017

Guinea is a member of the African Union, Agency for the French-Speaking Community, African Development Bank, Economic Community of West African States, World Bank, Islamic Development Bank, IMF, and the United Nations.

According to a February 2009 U.S. Department of State statement, Guinea's foreign relations, including those with its West African neighbours, had improved steadily since 1985. The Department's November 2016 statement indicated that although "the U.S. condemned" Guinea's "2008 military coup d'etat," the U.S. had "close relations" with Guinea before the coup, and after "Guinea's presidential elections in 2010, the United States re-established strong diplomatic relations with the government." The statement indicated support for the "legislative elections in 2013 and a second presidential election in 2015" as signs of "democratic reform."

A March 2021 report by the U.S. Department of State blasted extensive human rights violations by the government, security forces and businesses in Guinea. The report cited extensive international criticism of the recent national elections, which yielded "President Alpha Conde's re-election (despite disputed results) [...] following a controversial March referendum amending the constitution and allowing him to run for a third term." The department condemned the 2021 coup. The U.S. called for "national dialogue to address concerns sustainably and transparently".

The United Nations promptly denounced the 2021 coup, and some of Guinea's allies condemned the coup. The African Union and West Africa's regional bloc (ECOWAS) both threatened sanctions, while some analysts expect the threats to be of limited effect because Guinea is not a member of the West African currency union and is not a landlocked country. ECOWAS promptly suspended Guinea's membership and demanded the unconditional release of President Condé, while sending envoys to Conakry to attempt a "constitutional" resolution of the situation. China opposed the coup too.

=== Military ===
Guinea's armed forces are divided into 5 branches—army, navy, air force, the paramilitary National Gendarmerie and the Republican Guard—whose chiefs report to the Chairman of the Joint Chiefs of Staff who is subordinate to the Minister of Defence. In addition, regime security forces include the National Police Force (Sûreté Nationale). The Gendarmerie, responsible for internal security, has a strength of several thousand.

The army, with about 15,000 personnel, is by far the largest branch of the armed forces and is mainly responsible for protecting the state borders, the security of administered territories, and defending Guinea's national interests. Air force personnel total about 700. Its equipment includes several Russian-supplied fighter planes and transports. The navy has about 900 personnel and operates several small patrol craft and barges.

=== Human rights ===
Homosexuality is illegal in Guinea. The prime minister declared, in 2010, that he does not consider sexual orientation a legitimate human right.

Guinea has one of the world's highest rates of female genital mutilation (FGM, sometimes referred to as 'female circumcision') according to Anastasia Gage, an associate professor at Tulane University, and Ronan van Rossem, an associate professor at Ghent University. Female genital mutilation in Guinea had been performed on more than 98% of women as of 2009. In Guinea "almost all cultures, religions, and ethnicities" practice female genital mutilation. The 2005 Demographic and Health Survey reported that 96% of women have gone through the operation.

== Economy ==
As of the most recent survey in 2018, 66.2% of the population is affected by multidimensional poverty and an additional 16.4% vulnerable to it.

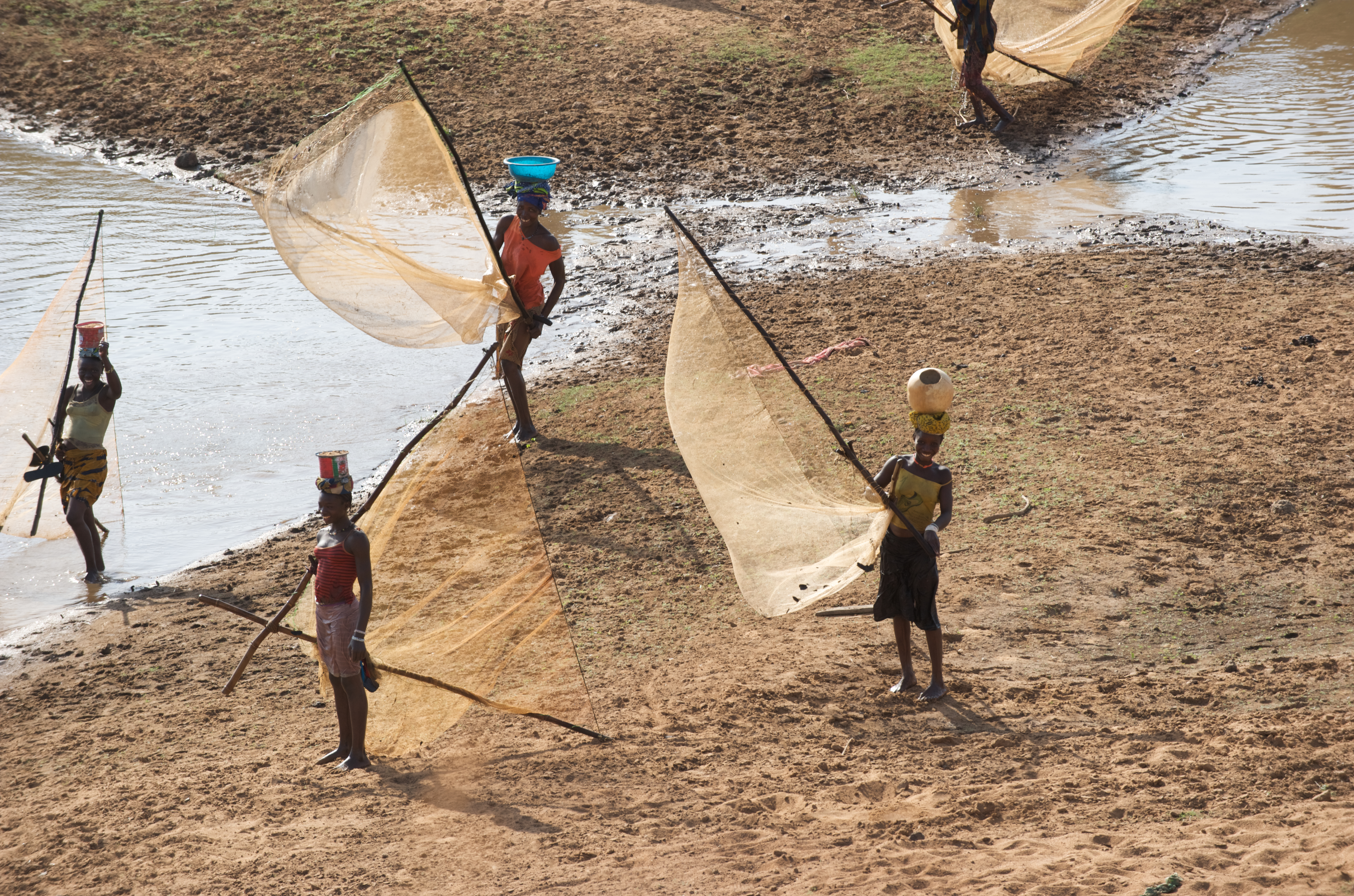
Malinke fisher women on the Niger River, Niandankoro, Kankan Region, in eastern Guinea

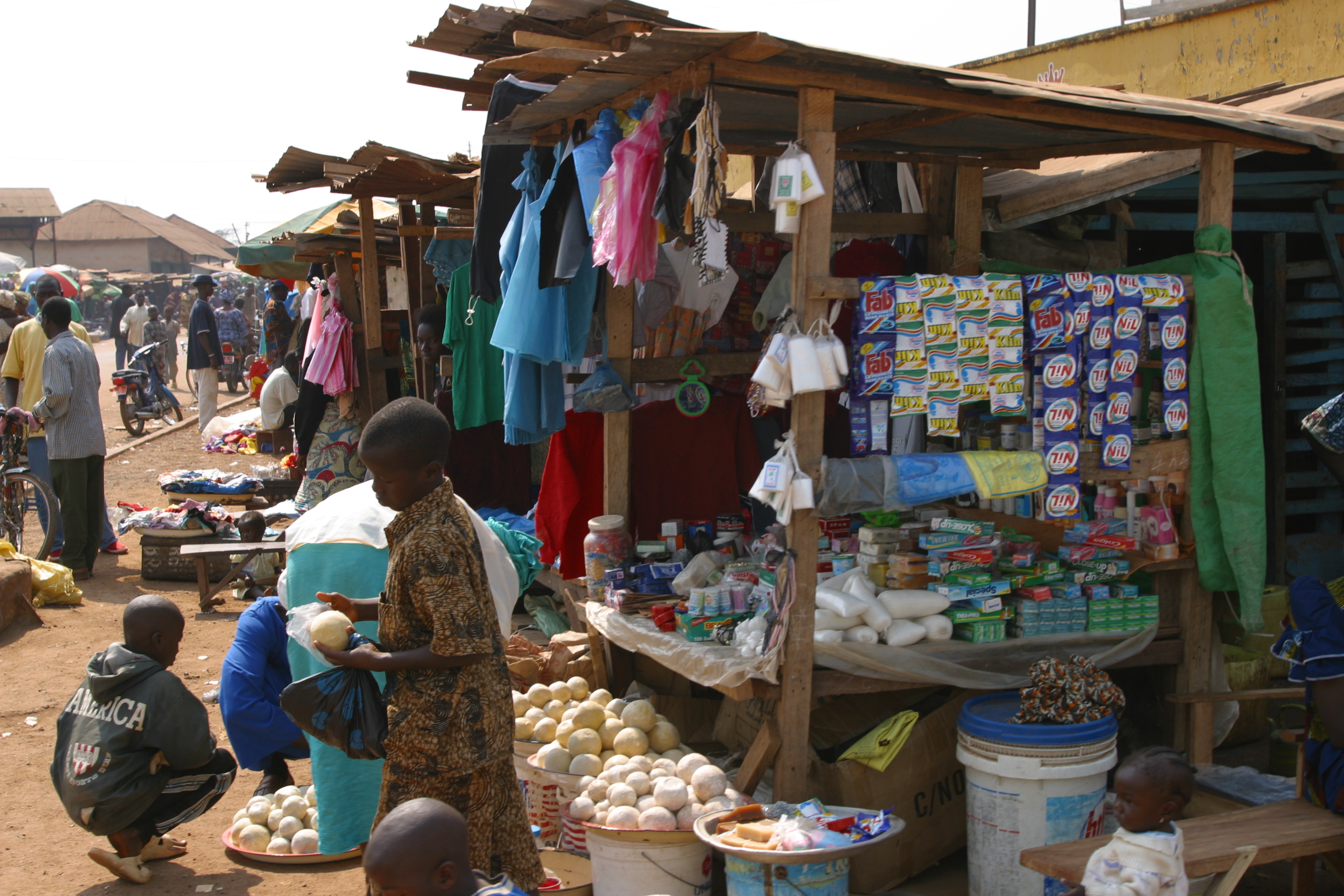
Kissidougou market

=== Agriculture ===
The agriculture sector at some point employed approximately 75% of the country. The rice is cultivated in the flooded zones between streams and rivers. The local production of rice is not sufficient to feed the country, so rice is imported from Asia. Guinea is one of the emerging regional producers of apples and pears. There are plantations of grapes, pomegranates, and more recent years have seen the development of strawberry plantations, based on the vertical hydroponic system.

=== Natural resources ===
Guinea has 25% or more of the world's known bauxite reserves. It has diamonds, gold, and other metals. The gold production of Guinea in 2015 was 17 metric tonnes. Bauxite and alumina are the most major exports.

=== Mining ===
Guinea possesses over 25 billion tonnes (metric tons) of bauxite—and perhaps up to one half of the world's reserves. Its mineral wealth includes more than 4-billion tonnes of high-grade iron ore, diamond and gold deposits, as well as uranium.

Joint venture bauxite mining and alumina operations in north-west Guinea historically provide about 80% of Guinea's foreign exchange reserves. Bauxite is refined into alumina, which is later smelted into aluminium. The Compagnie des Bauxites de Guinée (CBG) exports about 14 million tonnes of high-grade bauxite annually. CBG is a joint venture, 49% owned by the Guinean government and 51% by an international consortium known as Halco Mining, itself a joint venture controlled by aluminium producer Alcoa, global miner Rio Tinto and Dadco Investments. CBG has exclusive rights to bauxite reserves and resources in north-western Guinea, through 2038. In 2008, protesters upset about poor electrical services blocked the tracks CBG uses. Guinea includes a proviso in its agreements with international oil companies, requiring its partners to generate power for nearby communities.

The Compagnie des Bauxites de Kindia (CBK), a joint venture between the government of Guinea and RUSAL, produces some 2.5 million tonnes annually, nearly all of which is exported to Russia and Eastern Europe. Dian Dian, a Guinean/Ukrainian joint bauxite venture, has a projected production rate of 1,000,000 t (1,102,311 short tons; 984,207 long tons) per year, and is not expected to begin operation for several years. The Alumina Compagnie de Guinée (ACG), which took over the former Friguia Consortium, produced about 2.4 million tonnes in 2004, as raw material for its alumina refinery. The refinery exports about 750,000 tonnes of alumina. Both Global Alumina and Alcoa-Alcan have signed conventions with the government of Guinea to build large alumina refineries, with a combined capacity of about 4 million tonnes per year.

The Simandou mine is an iron ore reserve. In March 2010, Anglo-Australian corporation Rio Tinto and its biggest shareholder, Aluminum Corporation of China (Chinalco), signed a preliminary agreement to develop Rio Tinto's iron ore project. In 2017, the Serious Fraud Office (SFO), Britain's anti-fraud regulator, launched an official investigation into Rio Tinto's business and mining practices in Guinea.

Tigui Camara, a former model, is the first woman in Guinea to own a mining company which is partially run as a social enterprise.

=== Oil ===
In 2006, Guinea signed a production sharing agreement with Hyperdynamics Corporation of Houston to explore an offshore tract, and was then in partnership with Dana Petroleum PLC (Aberdeen, United Kingdom). The initial well, the Sabu-1, was scheduled to begin drilling in October 2011, at a site in approximately 700 metres of water. The Sabu-1 targeted a 4-way anticline prospect with upper Cretaceous sands, and was anticipated to be drilled to a total depth of 3,600 metres.

Following the completion of exploratory drilling in 2012, the Sabu-1 well was not deemed commercially viable. In November 2012, Hyperdynamics subsidiary SCS reached an agreement for a sale of 40% of the concession to Tullow Oil, bringing ownership shares in the Guinea offshore tract to 37% Hyperdynamics, 40% Tullow Oil, and 23% Dana Petroleum. Hyperdynamics will have until September 2016, under the current agreement, to begin drilling its next selected site, the Fatala Cenomanian turbidite fan prospect.

=== Tourism ===
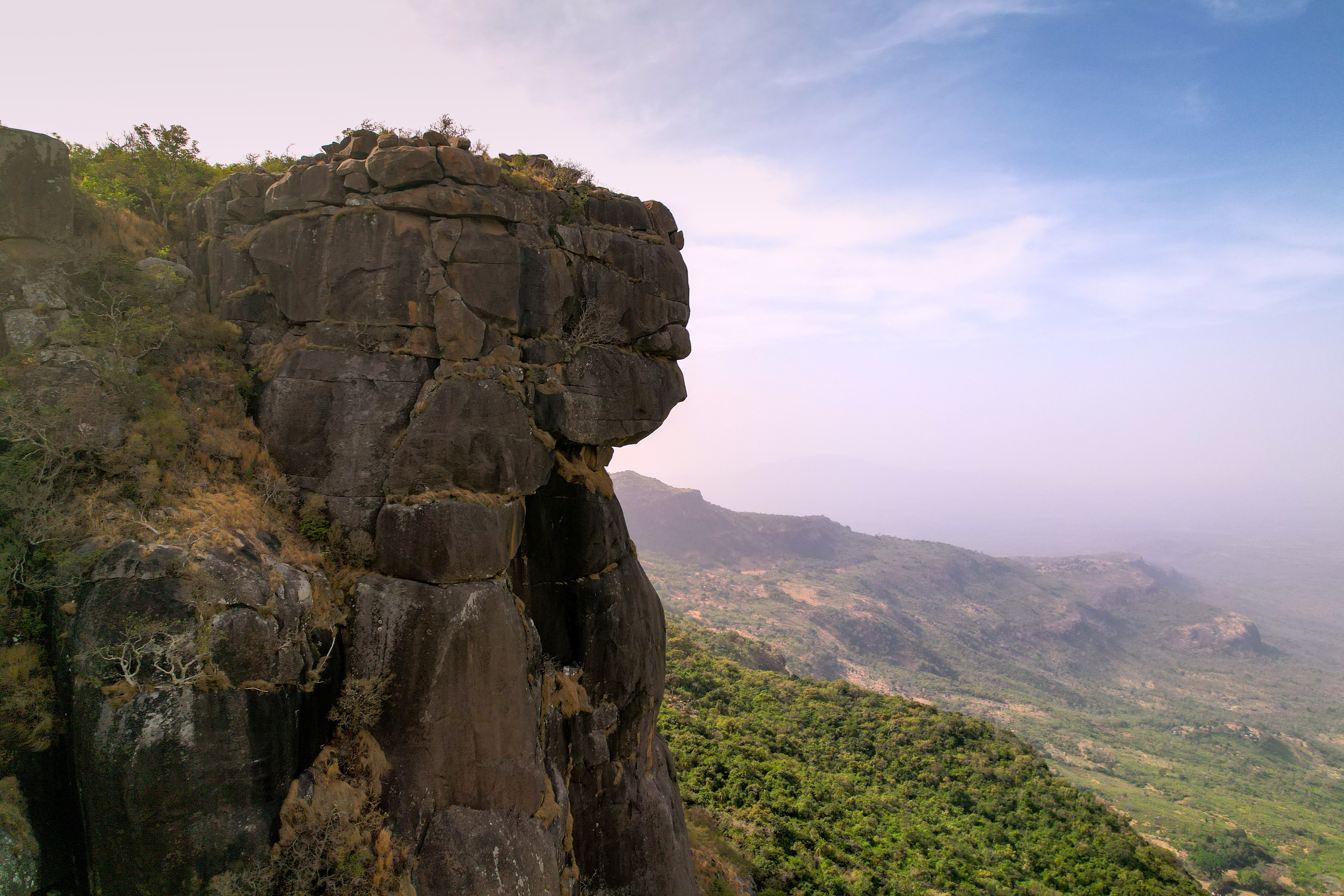
Dame de Mali

Among the attractions in Guinea are the waterfalls found mostly in the Basse Guinee (Lower Guinea) and Moyenne Guinee (Middle Guinea) regions. The Soumba cascade at the foot of Mount Kakoulima in Kindia, Voile de la Mariée (Bride's Veil) in Dubreka, the Kinkon cascades that are about 80 m (260 ft) high on the Kokoula River in the prefecture of Pita, the Kambadaga falls that can reach 100 m (330 ft) during the rainy season on the same river, the Ditinn & Mitty waterfalls in Dalaba, and the Fetoré waterfalls and the stone bridge in the region of Labe are among water-related tourist sites.

== Transport ==
Ahmed Sékou Touré International Airport in Conakry is the largest airport in the country, with flights to other cities in Africa and to Europe.

Built between 1904 and 1910, a railway that once linked Conakry to Kankan via Kouroussa ceased operating in 1995 and had been dismantled altogether by 2007 with the rails mostly stolen or sold for scrap. Plans had at one time been mooted for the passenger line to be rehabilitated as part of an iron-ore development master plan and while the start of work was announced in 2010, corruption charges led the whole master plan to be paused and the line was rebuilt as a 105 km mineral railway, paralleling the older route as far as the mines of Kalia. There is a state run mineral railway linking the bauxite mines of Sangarédi to the port of Kamsar (137 km) and a 1960s narrow-gauge line operated by Russian aluminium producer RusAl to the mines at Fria (143 km).

As part of the plans to restart iron ore mining at Simandou blocks 1 and 2, the new development consortium pledged in 2019 to fund the construction of a new heavy-duty standard gauge railway to Matakong on the Atlantic coast, where they would invest some US$20 billion in developing a deepwater port. The 650 km route is longer than an alternative heading south to the port of Buchanan, Liberia, which was considered as an alternative in an October 2019 feasibility study.

== Demographics ==
Population in Guinea
Year	Million
1950	3.0
2000	8.8
2021	13.5
2025	17.5

At the Census of 1 July 2025, the population of Guinea was calculated to be 17.5 million. Conakry, the capital and most populous city, is a hub of economy, commerce, education, and culture. In 2014, the total fertility rate (TFR) of Guinea was estimated at 4.93 children born per woman.

=== Largest cities ===
The following table excludes those communes which are within the Conakry Special Zone.

Rank	City name	Region	Population 2014 census	Population 2025 census
1	Conakry	Conakry	1,660,973	3,407,327
2	Kankan	Kankan	190,722	410,542
3	Nzérékoré	Nzérékoré	195,027	316,065
4	Siguiri	Kankan	127,492	^{est.}303,000
5	Kindia	Kindia	138,695	^{est.}220,000
6	Dubréka	Kindia	157,017	205,899
7	Labé	Labé	92,654	^{est.}172,000
8	Kissidougou	Faranah	99,931	167,985
9	Coyah	Kindia	49,574	157,387
10	Kamsar	Boké	83,428	^{est.}148,000
11	Mamou	Mamou	68,139	^{est.}125,000
12	Boké	Boké	54,898	^{est.}116,000

Note that Manéah, which was in the 2014 list (in 4th place) is no longer included as it is now part of Conakry; its place is effectively taken by adjacent Coyah. Dubréka and Coyah communes remain suburban to Conakry, but outside the Conakry Spoecial Zone borders. Populations not yet calculated for the 2025 Census (indicated by ^{est.} above), are equivalent estimates taken from City Population website.

=== Ethnic groups ===
The population of Guinea comprises about 24 ethnic groups. The Mandinka, also known as Mandingo or Malinké, comprise 25.4% of the population and are mostly found in eastern Guinea, concentrated around the Kankan and Kissidougou prefectures. The Fulas or Fulani comprise 43.4% of the population and are mostly found in the Futa Djallon region. The Soussou, comprising 17.2% of the population, are predominantly in western areas around the capital Conakry, Forécariah, and Kindia. Smaller ethnic groups make up the remaining 16% of the population, including Kpelle, Kissi, Zialo, Toma and others. In 2017, approximately 10,000 non-Africans lived in Guinea, predominantly Lebanese, French, and other Europeans.

=== Languages ===
Many languages are spoken in Guinea. According to the most recent constitution of September 2025, the official languages are the local languages with Susu, Fulani, Malinke, Kissi, Kpelle, Toma, Landuma and Uanian as well as French, while after the colonialization it was French only. French remains the working language. Implementing the local African N'Ko and Adlam scripts is promoted by law since 2026. Pular was the native language of 33.9% of the population in 2018, followed by Maninka with 29.4%. The third most spoken native language is the Susu, spoken by 21.2% of the population in 2018 as their first language. The remainder of the population has other native languages, including Kissi and Kpelle.

=== Religion ===
Guinea religious groups in 2020
Religion	Per cent
Islam	86.8%
Traditional African religion	9.42%
Christianity	3.52%

The Grand Mosque of Conakry was built under Ahmed Sékou Touré with funding from King Fahd of Saudi Arabia.

In 2023, the Association of Religion Data Archives (ARDA) reported that the population was 86.8% Muslim, 3.52% Christian and 9.42% animist. In the past Muslims and Christians have incorporated indigenous African beliefs into their outlook.

The majority of Guinean Muslims are adherent to Sunni Islam, of the Maliki school of jurisprudence, influenced by Sufism. Christian groups include Roman Catholics, Anglicans, Baptists, Seventh-day Adventists, and Evangelical groups. Jehovah's Witnesses are active in the country and recognised by the Government. There is a Baháʼí Faith community. There are numbers of Hindus, Buddhists, and traditional Chinese religious groups among the expatriate community.

There were three days of ethno-religious fighting in the city of Nzerekore in July 2013. Fighting between ethnic Kpelle who are Christian or animist, and ethnic Konianke who are Muslims and close to the larger Malinke ethnic group, left at least 54 dead. The dead included people who were killed with machetes and burned alive. The violence ended after the Guinean military imposed a curfew, and President Conde made a televised appeal for calm. In 2021, violence was limited to Kendoumaya, Lower Guinea, and mainly concerned a land rights dispute between locals and a monastery.

=== Education ===
In 2010, it was estimated that 41% of adults were literate (52% of males and 30% of females). Primary education is compulsory for 6 years. In 1999, primary school attendance was 40% and children, particularly girls, were kept out of school to assist their parents with domestic work or agriculture or to be married. In 2015, Guinea had "one of the highest rates" of child marriage in the world.

=== Health ===
==== Ebola ====
In 2014, an outbreak of the Ebola virus occurred in Guinea which first started in a village called Meliandou. In response, the health ministry banned the sale and consumption of bats, thought to be carriers of the disease. The virus eventually spread from rural areas to Conakry, and by June 2014, had spread to Sierra Leone and Liberia. In August 2014, Guinea closed its borders to Sierra Leone and Liberia, as more new cases of the disease were being reported in those countries than in Guinea.

"Unsafe burials" are a source of Ebola transmission. The World Health Organization (WHO) reported that the inability to engage with local communities hindered the ability of health workers to trace the origins and strains of the virus. While WHO terminated the Public Health Emergency of International Concern (PHEIC) on 29 March 2016, the Ebola Situation Report released on 30 March confirmed 5 more cases in the preceding 2 weeks, with viral sequencing relating 1 of the cases to the November 2014 outbreak. Healthcare visits by the population declined due to fear of infection and to mistrust in the health-care system, and the system's ability to provide routine health-care and HIV/AIDS treatments decreased due to the Ebola outbreak.

Ebola re-emerged in Guinea in January and February 2021.

==== HIV/AIDS ====
An estimated 170,000 adults and children were infected at the end of 2004. Surveillance surveys conducted in 2001 and 2002 show higher rates of HIV in urban areas than in rural areas. Prevalence was highest in Conakry (5%) and in the cities of the Forest Guinea region (7%) bordering Côte d'Ivoire, Liberia, and Sierra Leone.

HIV is spread primarily through multiple-partner intercourse. Men and women are at nearly equal risk for HIV, with people aged 15 to 24 most vulnerable. Surveillance figures from 2001 to 2002 show the rates among commercial sex workers (42%), active military personnel (6.6%), truck drivers and bush taxi drivers (7.3%), miners (4.7%), and adults with tuberculosis (8.6%). Several factors were attributed to what fuelled the HIV/AIDS epidemic in Guinea. They include unprotected sex, multiple sexual partners, illiteracy, endemic poverty, unstable borders, refugee migration, lack of civic responsibility, and scarce medical care and public services.

==== Malaria and other diseases ====
Malaria is transmitted year-round, with peak transmission from July through October. It is a cause of disability in Guinea.

Tuberculosis and hepatitis B are also major health concerns in Guinea, with chronic hepatitis B affecting an estimated 10% of the population.

Several neglected tropical diseases are also present in the country, including schistosomiasis, onchocerciasis, lymphatic filariasis, and trachoma. Schistosomiasis is particularly widespread, and all 38 administrative districts are affected. Outbreaks of yellow fever, measles, and meningitis also occur regularly in Guinea.

==== COVID-19 pandemic ====
The first case of COVID-19 was reported in Guinea on 13 March 2020. By the end of 2020, the total number of confirmed cases was 13,722. Of these, 13,141 had recovered, 500 were active, and 81 people had died.

==== Maternal and child healthcare ====
The maternal mortality rate for Guinea was 576 per 100,000 births in 2021. This is compared with 680 in 2010, 859.9 in 2008, and 964.7 in 1990. The under-5 mortality rate per 1,000 births is 146, and the neonatal mortality as a percentage of under-5 mortality is 29. In Guinea, the number of midwives per 1,000 live births is 1 and the lifetime risk of death for pregnant women is 1 in 26. Guinea has the second highest prevalence of female genital mutilation in the world.

==== Malnutrition ====
A 2012 study reported malnutrition rates with levels ranging from 34% to 40% by region, and acute malnutrition rates above 10% in Upper Guinea's mining zones. The survey showed that 139,200 children underwent acute malnutrition, 609,696 underwent chronic malnutrition, and a further 1,592,892 have anaemia. Degradation of care practices, limited access to medical services, inadequate hygiene practices, and a lack of food diversity were said to explain these levels.

== Culture ==
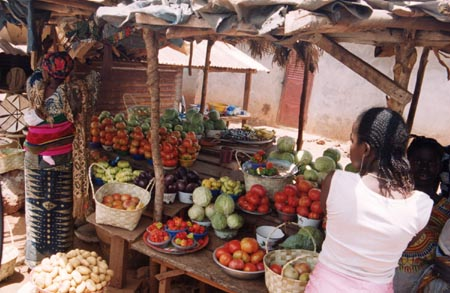
A market stall selling vegetables in Dinguiraye Prefecture, Guinea

=== Sports ===
Football is the "most popular sport" in the country of Guinea, alongside basketball. Football operations are run by the Guinean Football Federation. The association administers the national football team, and the national league. It was founded in 1960 and affiliated with FIFA since 1962 and with the Confederation of African Football since 1963. The Guinea national football team, nicknamed Syli nationale (National Elephants), have played international football since 1962. Their first opponent was East Germany. They have yet to reach World Cup finals, and were runners-up to Morocco in the Africa Cup of Nations in 1976.

Guinée Championnat National is the top division of Guinean football. Since it was established in 1965, 3 teams have dominated in winning the Guinée Coupe Nationale. Horoya AC has at least 16 titles and is the 2017–2018 champion. Hafia FC (known as Conakry II in 1960s) has at least 15 titles, having dominated in 1960s and 70s. AS Kaloum Star (known as Conakry I in the 1960s) has at least 13 titles. All 3 teams are based in Conakry. Hafia FC won the African Cup of Champions Clubs 3 times, in 1972, 1975 and 1977, while Horoya AC won the 1978 African Cup Winners' Cup.

=== Polygamy ===
Polygamy is generally prohibited by law in Guinea, but there are exceptions. In 2020, it was estimated that about 26% of marriages were polygamous (29% Muslim and 10% Christian).

=== Cuisine ===
Guinean cuisine varies by region, with staple ingredients including rice, corn, cassava, sweet potatoes, cocoyams, plantains, millet, and fonio. Part of West African cuisine, some traditional dishes of Guinea include fou-fou, patates, tapalapa, attieke, bissap, maafe, and okra sauce. In rural areas, food is eaten from a "large serving dish" and eaten by hand outside of homes.

=== Music ===
The traditional instruments of Guinea are the drum, kora, bala and koni.

== See also ==
- Outline of Guinea
