= Maritime Guinea =

Maritime Guinea (French: Guinée Maritime), also known as Lower Guinea (not to be confused with Lower Guinea, the southern coastal area of the Gulf of Guinea), is one of the four natural regions of Guinea. It is located in the west of the country, between the Atlantic Ocean and the Fouta Djallon plateau. Conakry, Guinea's capital and largest city, is located in the region.

== Geography ==
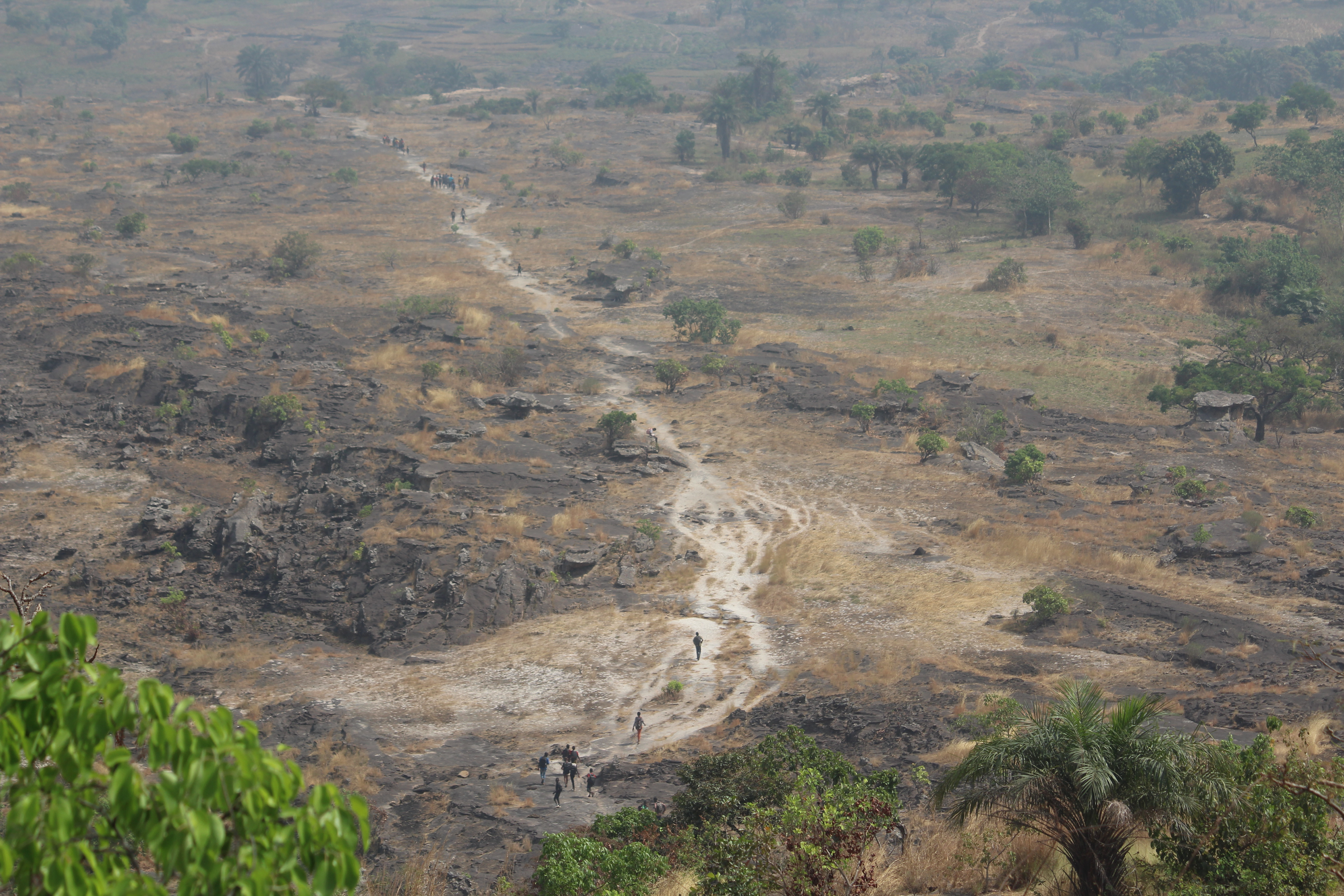
Climbing up Mount Gangan.

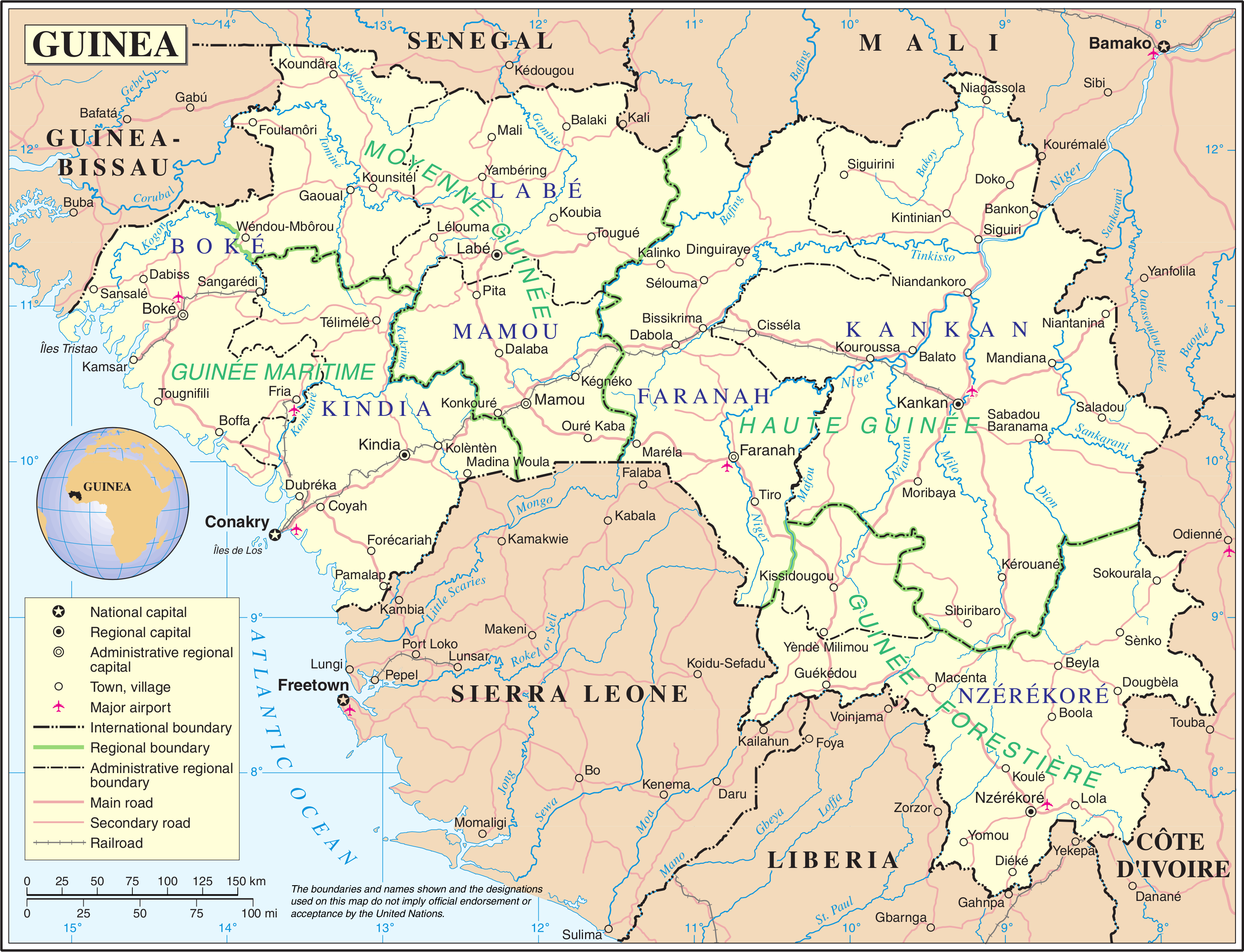
A map of Guinea's natural regions and administrative divisions

Maritime Guinea includes the Atlantic coast and coastal plain. The coast is indented with rias, or drowned river valleys, that form inlets, tidal marshes, mangrove forests, and estuaries, and numerous offshore islands. Conakry occupies Tombo Island and the adjacent Kaloum Peninsula.

The region is bounded by the Atlantic Ocean to the west, Guinea Bissau to the northwest, the Fouta Djallon, also known as Middle Guinea, to the northeast and east, and Sierra Leone to the south.

The region is a gentle coastal plain, between 50 and 80 km (31 and 50 mi) wide, and wider in the south than the north. the Fouta Djallon plateau rises from the plain, and several rivers, including the Fatala, Konkouré, and Kolenté, originate in the Fouta Djallon and flow west to empty into the Atlantic.

The base rocks of the region are granite and gneiss. Laterite, a red soil rich in iron oxides and aluminum hydroxide, and sandstone gravel are the dominant soil types.

== Climate ==
The climate of Guinea is tropical, with a six-month dry season (November through March) and a wet season (April through October). The heaviest rainfall comes in June, with the arrival of the Inter-Tropical Convergence Zone (ITCZ).

Average rainfall at Conakry is about 4,300 mm (170 in) a year, and the average annual temperature is about 27 °C (low 80s F).

== Ecoregions ==
- Guinean forest-savanna mosaic covers most of the region, extending north into Guinea Bissau and Senegal, and east through northern Sierra Leone and Upper Guinea.
- Western Guinean lowland forests occupies the area around Conakry and south, extending into coastal Sierra Leone, Liberia, and western Côte d'Ivoire.
- Guinean mangroves, in the coastal estuaries. Enclaves extend north into Guinea Bissau, Gambia and Senegal, and southeast through Sierra Leone, Liberia, and Côte d'Ivoire.

== People ==
Peoples of Maritime Guinea include the Baga, who live along the coast; the Susu in the southern part of the region around Conakry and into adjacent Sierra Leone; and the Fulani in the north.
