= Outline of Guinea =

Country in West Africa

The Flag of Guinea

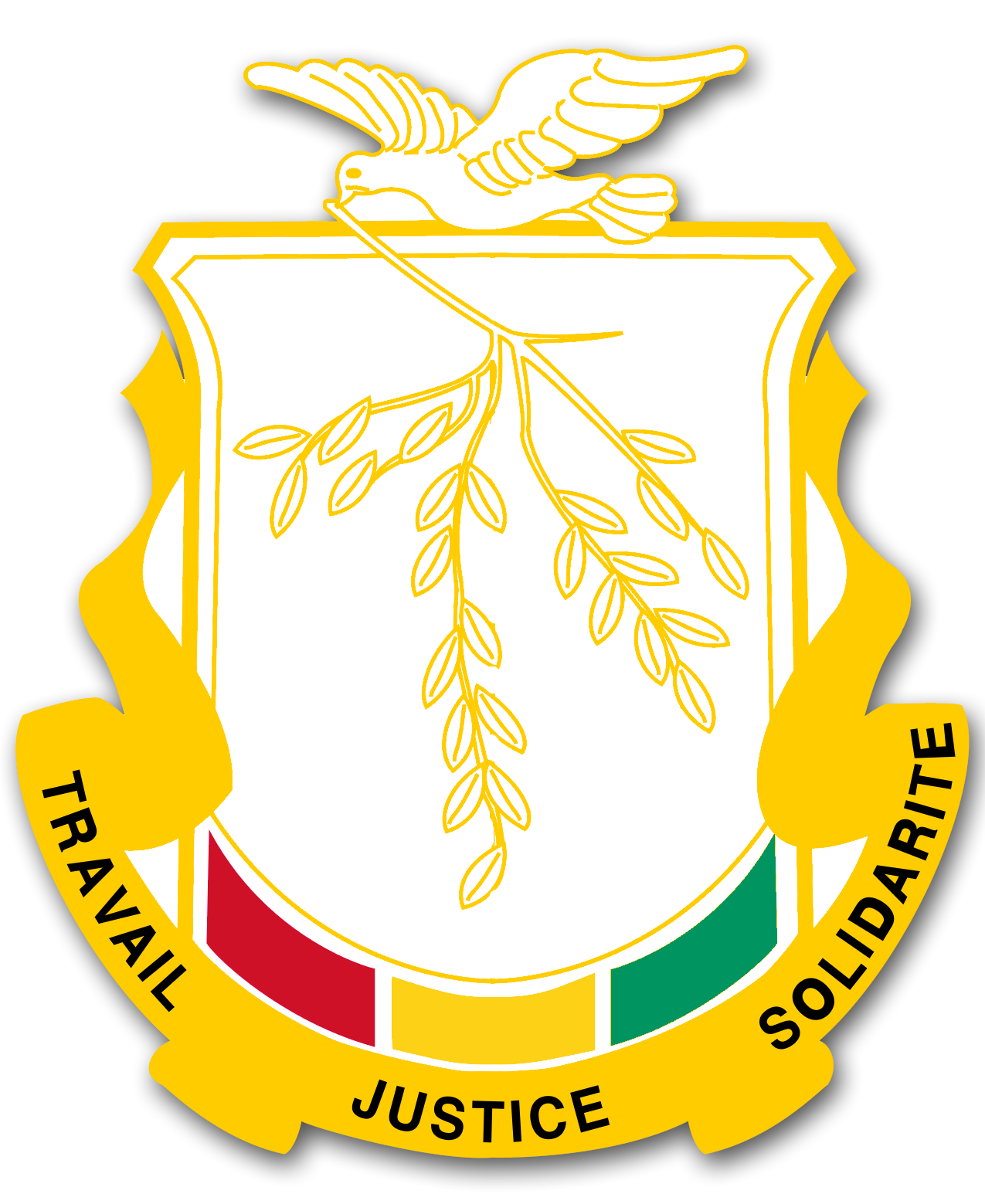
The Coat of arms of Guinea

The location of Guinea

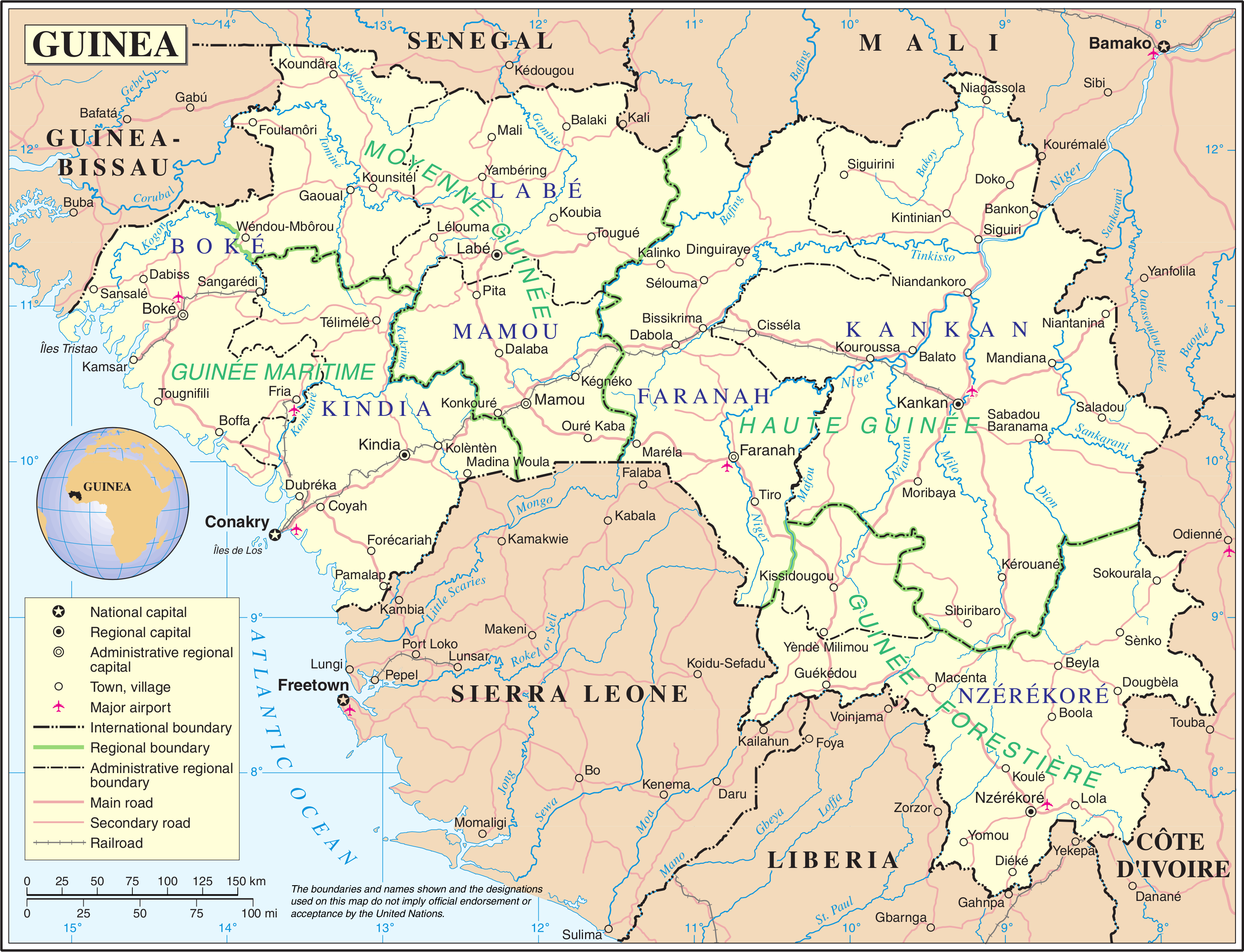
An enlargeable map of the Republic of Guinea

The following outline is provided as an overview of and topical guide to Guinea:

Guinea – country located in West Africa, that was formerly known as French Guinea. Guinea's territory has a curved shape, with its base at the Atlantic Ocean, inland to the east, and turning south. The base borders Guinea-Bissau and Senegal to the north, and Mali to the north and north-east; the inland part borders Côte d'Ivoire to the south-east, Liberia to the south, and Sierra Leone to the west of the southern tip. Its water sources include the Niger, Senegal, and Gambia rivers. Guinea is sometimes called Guinea-Conakry (Conakry being its capital) to differentiate it from the neighboring Guinea-Bissau (whose capital is Bissau).

== General reference ==
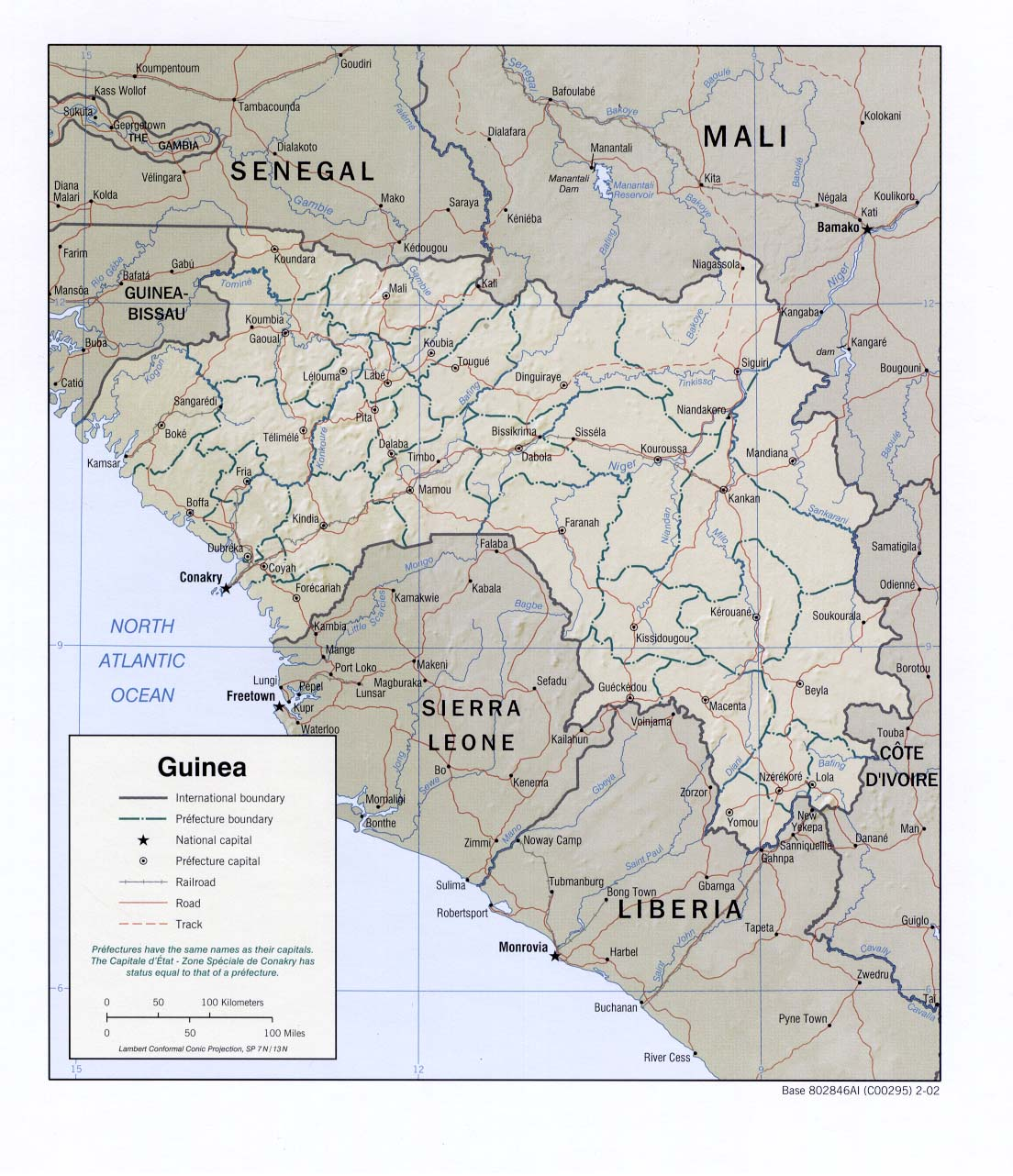
An enlargeable relief map of Guinea

- Pronunciation: /ˈɡɪni/
- Common English country names: Guinea or Guinea-Conakry
- Official English country name: The Republic of Guinea
- Common endonym(s):
- Official endonym(s):
- Adjectival(s): Guinean
- Demonym(s): Guinean(s)
- ISO country codes: GN, GIN, 324
- ISO region codes: See ISO 3166-2:GN
- Internet country code top-level domain: .gn

== Geography of Guinea ==
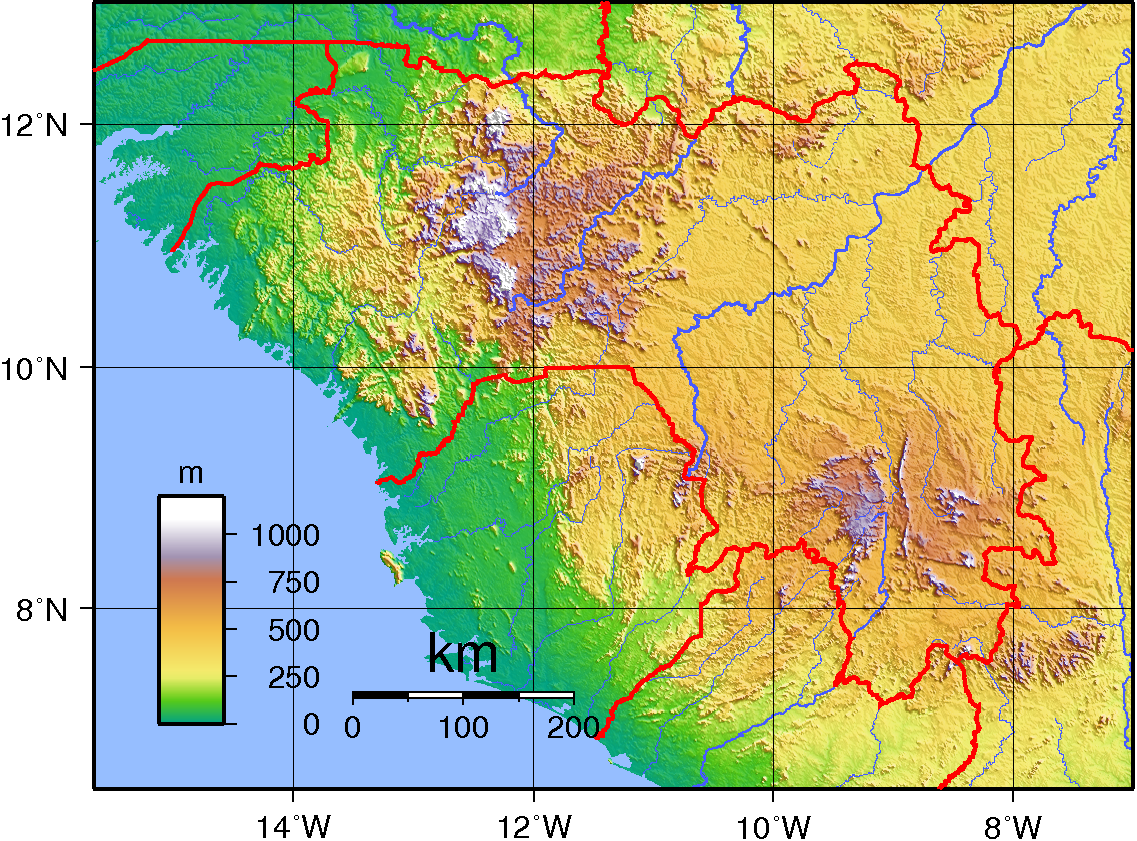
An enlargeable topographic map of Guinea

Geography of Guinea

- Guinea is: a country
- Population of Guinea: 9,370,000 - 87th most populous country
- Area of Guinea: 245,857 km^{2}
- Atlas of Guinea

=== Location ===
- Guinea is situated within the following regions:
  - Northern Hemisphere and Western Hemisphere
  - Africa
    - West Africa
- Time zone: Coordinated Universal Time UTC+00
- Extreme points of Guinea
  - High: Mont Nimba 1,752 m (5,748 ft)
  - Low: North Atlantic Ocean 0 m
- Land boundaries: 3,399 km
  Mali 858 km
  Sierra Leone 652 km
  Cote d'Ivoire 610 km
  Liberia 563 km
  Guinea-Bissau 386 km
  Senegal 330 km
  - Coastline: North Atlantic Ocean 320 km

=== Environment of Guinea ===
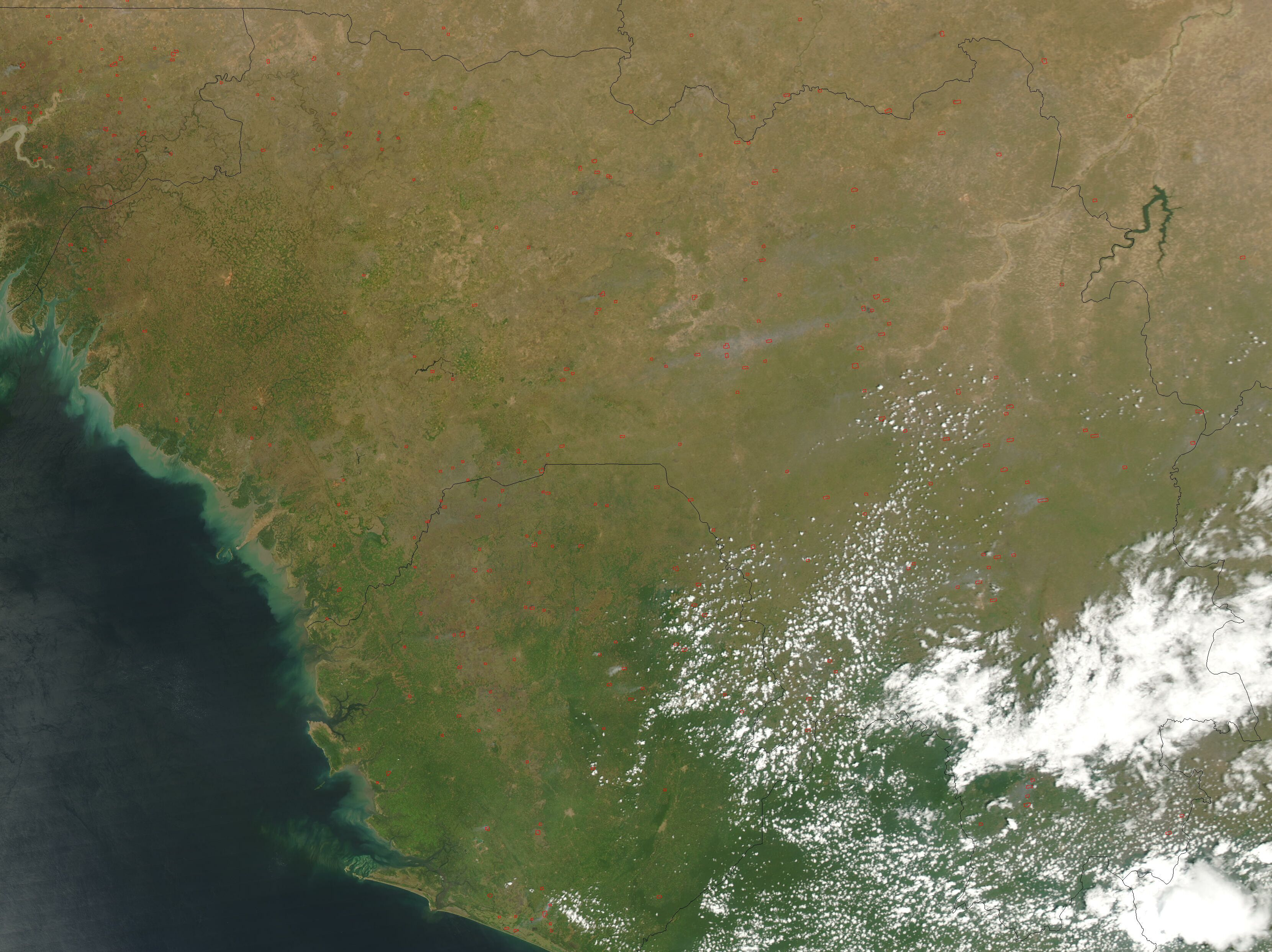
An enlargeable satellite image of Guinea

- Climate of Guinea
- Geology of Guinea
- Protected areas of Guinea
- Wildlife of Guinea
  - Fauna of Guinea
    - Birds of Guinea
    - Insects of Guinea
      - Butterflies of Guinea
      - Moths of Guinea
    - Mammals of Guinea

==== Natural geographic features of Guinea ====
- Glaciers in Guinea: none
- Forests in Guinea
  - Upper Guinean forests
    - Western Guinean lowland forests
    - Guinean montane forests
  - Guinean forest-savanna mosaic
- Guinean mangroves
- Rivers of Guinea
- World Heritage Sites in Guinea

=== Regions of Guinea ===
- Natural regions of Guinea

==== Ecoregions of Guinea ====
Ecoregions in Guinea – the following ecoregions lie partially within Guinea:

- Upper Guinean forests
  - Western Guinean lowland forests
  - Guinean montane forests
- Guinean forest-savanna mosaic
- West Sudanian savanna
- Guinean mangroves

==== Administrative divisions of Guinea ====
Administrative divisions of Guinea

- Regions of Guinea
  - Prefectures of Guinea
    - Sub-prefectures of Guinea

===== Regions of Guinea =====
Regions of Guinea

===== Prefectures of Guinea =====
Prefectures of Guinea

===== Municipalities of Guinea =====
- Capital of Guinea: Conakry
- Cities of Guinea

=== Demography of Guinea ===
Demographics of Guinea

== Government and politics of Guinea ==
Politics of Guinea

- Form of government: presidential republic
- Capital of Guinea: Conakry
- Elections in Guinea
  - Guinean general election, 1968
  - Guinean general election, 1974
  - Guinean legislative election, 1963
  - Guinean legislative election, 1980
  - Guinean legislative election, 1995
  - Guinean legislative election, 2002
  - Guinean legislative election, 2013
- Political parties in Guinea

=== Branches of the government of Guinea ===
Government of Guinea

==== Executive branch of the government of Guinea ====
- Head of state: President of Guinea
- Head of government: President of Guinea
- Cabinet of Guinea
  - Cabinet of the First Republic of Guinea – governing body of Guinea from independence on 28 September 1958 until the death of President Ahmed Sékou Touré on 26 March 1984, followed by a bloodless coup by Colonel Lansana Conté on 5 April 1984.
  - Ministers of Justice of Guinea

==== Legislative branch of the government of Guinea ====
- National Assembly (unicameral)

==== Judicial branch of the government of Guinea ====
- Ministers of Justice of Guinea

=== Foreign relations of Guinea ===
Foreign relations of Guinea

- Diplomatic missions in Guinea
- Diplomatic missions of Guinea
  - Embassy of Guinea in Washington, D.C.
  - Embassy of Guinea, London

==== International organization membership ====
The Republic of Guinea is a member of:

- African, Caribbean, and Pacific Group of States (ACP)
- African Development Bank Group (AfDB)
- African Union (AU)
- Economic Community of West African States (ECOWAS)
- Food and Agriculture Organization (FAO)
- Group of 77 (G77)
- International Bank for Reconstruction and Development (IBRD)
- International Civil Aviation Organization (ICAO)
- International Criminal Court (ICCt)
- International Criminal Police Organization (Interpol)
- International Development Association (IDA)
- International Federation of Red Cross and Red Crescent Societies (IFRCS)
- International Finance Corporation (IFC)
- International Fund for Agricultural Development (IFAD)
- International Labour Organization (ILO)
- International Maritime Organization (IMO)
- International Monetary Fund (IMF)
- International Olympic Committee (IOC)
- International Organization for Migration (IOM)
- International Organization for Standardization (ISO) (correspondent)
- International Red Cross and Red Crescent Movement (ICRM)
- International Telecommunication Union (ITU)
- International Telecommunications Satellite Organization (ITSO)
- International Trade Union Confederation (ITUC)
- Inter-Parliamentary Union (IPU)
- Islamic Development Bank (IDB)
- Multilateral Investment Guarantee Agency (MIGA)
- Nonaligned Movement (NAM)
- Organisation internationale de la Francophonie (OIF)
- Organisation of Islamic Cooperation (OIC)
- Organisation for the Prohibition of Chemical Weapons (OPCW)
- United Nations (UN)
- United Nations Conference on Trade and Development (UNCTAD)
- United Nations Educational, Scientific, and Cultural Organization (UNESCO)
- United Nations High Commissioner for Refugees (UNHCR)
- United Nations Industrial Development Organization (UNIDO)
- United Nations Mission for the Referendum in Western Sahara (MINURSO)
- United Nations Mission in the Sudan (UNMIS)
- United Nations Operation in Cote d'Ivoire (UNOCI)
- Universal Postal Union (UPU)
- World Confederation of Labour (WCL)
- World Customs Organization (WCO)
- World Federation of Trade Unions (WFTU)
- World Health Organization (WHO)
- World Intellectual Property Organization (WIPO)
- World Meteorological Organization (WMO)
- World Tourism Organization (UNWTO)
- World Trade Organization (WTO)

=== Law and order in Guinea ===
Law of Guinea

- Law Enforcement in Guinea
- Constitution of Guinea
  - Guinean constitutional referendum, 1958
  - Guinean constitutional referendum, 1990
  - Guinean constitutional referendum, 2001
- Crime in Guinea
  - Human trafficking in Guinea
  - Polygamy in Guinea
- Human rights in Guinea
  - LGBT rights in Guinea

=== Military of Guinea ===
Military of Guinea

- Command
  - Commander-in-chief:
- Forces
  - Army of Guinea
  - Air Force of Guinea

=== Local government in Guinea ===
Local government in Guinea

== History of Guinea ==
=== History of Guinea, by period ===
History of Guinea

- Early history – see history of West Africa
  - Sahelian kingdoms – the area which is now Guinea lay on the fringes of these Kingdoms
- Imamate of Futa Jallon – West African theocratic state based in the Futa Jallon highlands of modern Guinea. The state was founded around 1727 by a Fulani jihad and became part of the French colonial empire in 1896.
- Wassoulou Empire – short-lived (1878–1898) empire of West Africa built from the conquests of Dyula ruler Samori Touré and destroyed by the French colonial army.
- Anglo-French Convention of 1882 – confirmed the territorial boundaries between Guinea and Sierra Leone around Conakry and Freetown.
- Rivières du Sud – administrative division of colonial French West Africa
- French Guinea – colony until 1958, part of French West Africa
  - Colonial governors of French Guinea
- Independence – in 1958, the colony chose independence from France, and named itself Guinea
- Ahmed Sékou Touré – ruled as president from 1958 to 1984
  - Cabinet of the First Republic of Guinea – governing body of Guinea from independence on 28 September 1958 until the death of President Ahmed Sékou Touré on 26 March 1984, followed by a bloodless coup by Colonel Lansana Conté on 5 April 1984.
- Lansana Conté – took over in a bloodless coup, and ruled as president from 1984 to 2008
- 2007 Guinean general strike
- 2008 Guinean coup d'état – Moussa Dadis Camara seized control from 23 December 2008 to 3 December 2009
  - National Assembly of Guinea dissolved
- 2008 Guinean military unrest
- 2009 Guinea mine collapse
- Alpha Condé – elected president in 2010, survived an attempted coup less than a year later
- Guinean legislative election, 2013 – National Assembly of Guinea re-established
- 2014 in Guinea
  - Ebola virus epidemic in West Africa

=== History of Guinea, by region ===
- Timeline of Conakry

=== History of Guinea, by subject ===
- Massacres in Guinea

== Culture of Guinea ==
Culture of Guinea

- Architecture of Guinea
  - List of buildings and structures in Guinea
- Cuisine of Guinea
- Languages of Guinea
- Music of Guinea
  - Camayenne Sofa
- National symbols of Guinea
  - Coat of arms of Guinea
  - Flag of Guinea
  - National anthem of Guinea
- People of Guinea
  - List of Guineans
- Public holidays in Guinea
- Religion in Guinea
  - Christianity in Guinea
    - Roman Catholicism in Guinea
      - List of Roman Catholic dioceses in Guinea
    - Episcopal Conference of Guinea
  - Hinduism in Guinea
  - Islam in Guinea
- Scouting and Guiding in Guinea
- World Heritage Sites in Guinea

=== Art in Guinea ===
- Cinema of Guinea
  - List of Guinean films
- Literature of Guinea
  - List of Guinean writers
- Music of Guinea

=== Sports in Guinea ===
Sports in Guinea

- Football in Guinea
  - Football clubs in Guinea
- Guinea at the Olympics
- List of Guinean records in athletics
- Guinea national basketball team

== Economy and infrastructure of Guinea ==
Economy of Guinea

- Economic rank, by nominal GDP (2007): 138th (one hundred and thirty eighth)
- Agriculture in Guinea
- Banking in Guinea
  - Banks in Guinea
    - Central Bank of the Republic of Guinea – located in Conakry
- Communications in Guinea
  - Postage stamps and postal history of Guinea
  - Telecommunications in Guinea
    - Internet in Guinea
    - Telephone numbers in Guinea
- Companies of Guinea
  - Supermarket chains in Guinea
- Currency of Guinea: Franc
  - ISO 4217: GNF
- Energy in Guinea
  - Power stations in Guinea
- Health care in Guinea
- Mining in Guinea
- Trade unions in Guinea
- Transport in Guinea
  - Airports in Guinea
  - Rail transport in Guinea
    - Railway stations in Guinea

== Education in Guinea ==
Education in Guinea

- National Library of Guinea
- Schools in Guinea
- Universities in Guinea

== Health in Guinea ==
Health in Guinea

- HIV/AIDS in Guinea

== See also ==
Guinea

- List of Guinea-related topics
- List of international rankings
- Member state of the United Nations
- Outline of Africa
- Outline of geography
