= List of football clubs in Guinea =

The following is an incomplete list of association football clubs based in Guinea.

== A ==
- Académie SOAR
- AS Ashanti Golden Boys
- AS Batè Nafadji
- AS Kaloum Star
- ASFAG
- Athlético de Coléah

== C ==
- Club Industriel de Kamsar

== F ==
- FC Séquence de Dixinn
- Fello Star

== H ==
- Hafia Football Club
- Horoya AC

== M ==
- Milo FC

== S ==
- Sankaran FC
- Santoba FC
- Satellite FC

== T ==
- Tabounsou FC
