= Foreign relations of Guinea =

The foreign relations of Guinea, including those with its West African neighbors, have improved steadily since 1985.

== Diplomatic history ==
Guinea re-established relations with France and West Germany in 1975, and with neighboring Ivory Coast and Senegal in 1978. Guinea has been active in efforts toward regional integration and cooperation, especially regarding the Organisation of African Unity and the Economic Community of West African States (ECOWAS).

Guinea has participated in both diplomatic and military efforts to resolve conflicts in Liberia, Sierra Leone, and Guinea-Bissau, and contributed contingents of troops to peacekeeping operations in all three countries as part of ECOMOG, the Military Observer Group of ECOWAS. In the 1990s, Guinea hosted almost a million refugees fleeing the civil wars in Sierra Leone and Liberia. As of 2004, Guinea maintained a policy of unrestricted admission to refugees.

Guinea is also a member of the International Criminal Court with a Bilateral Immunity Agreement of protection for the United States military (as covered under Article 98).

=== 2009 ambassador recall ===
On 5 May 2009, President Moussa Dadis Camara, who seized power in a bloodless coup which followed the 22 December 2008 death of President Lansana Conté, announced the recall of 30 of Guinea's ambassadors to other countries. The order was made by a presidential decree on state television and was the first major diplomatic move made by the new leader.

The decision affected ambassadors to the United States, South Korea, the People's Republic of China, France, the United Kingdom, Russia, Egypt, South Africa, Italy, Japan, Brazil, Cuba, Switzerland, Serbia, Malaysia, Iran, the United Arab Emirates, Senegal, Nigeria, Libya, Ghana, Algeria, Morocco, Gabon, Liberia, Sierra Leone and Guinea-Bissau, comprising almost all of Guinea's foreign embassies. The Guinean representatives to the European Union, the United Nations and the African Union were also affected.

No reason was stated for the recall. The Tocqueville Connection states: "Most of the ambassadors were appointed by former prime minister Lansana Kouyaté, in office from February 2007 until May 2008," raising the possibility that the recall was an attempt on the part of Camara to distance himself from the previous government.

In late March 2009, the Guinean ambassador to Serbia faced expulsion for personal involvement in cigarette smuggling (1,000 packs of cigarettes were found in his BMW) but avoided arrest due to diplomatic immunity (although he was declared as persona non grata).

=== 2021 coup d'etat ===
The September 5, 2021 coup d'état brought swift condemnation and threats of sanctions from the United Nations, the African Union, the West African regional bloc ECOWAS (which suspended Guinea), and close allies of Guinea—as well as the United States—among others. China, uncharacteristically, also openly opposed the coup.

== Diplomatic relations ==
List of countries which Guinea maintains diplomatic relations with:

#	Country	Date
1	Russia	4 October 1958
2	North Korea	8 October 1958
3	Vietnam	9 October 1958
4	Albania	October 1958
5	Romania	14 November 1958
6	Bulgaria	2 January 1959
7	Israel	12 January 1959
8	France	21 January 1959
9	Ghana	January 1959
10	United States	13 February 1959
11	Czech Republic	14 February 1959
12	Hungary	26 February 1959
13	Liberia	6 March 1959
14	United Kingdom	28 May 1959
15	Poland	29 June 1959
16	Germany	30 July 1959
17	China	4 October 1959
18	Serbia	10 November 1959
19	Morocco	4 December 1959
20	Italy	5 December 1959
21	Egypt	1959
22	Belgium	28 January 1960
23	Netherlands	9 March 1960
24	Mongolia	22 April 1960
25	Indonesia	27 April 1960
26	Lebanon	3 June 1960
27	India	8 July 1960
28	Switzerland	19 July 1960
29	Cuba	30 August 1960
30	Mali	3 March 1961
31	Ivory Coast	21 March 1961
32	Saudi Arabia	15 May 1961
33	Senegal	9 June 1961
34	Finland	19 July 1961
35	Norway	21 July 1961
36	Sudan	24 August 1961
37	Nigeria	August 1961
38	Togo	14 September 1961
39	Sierra Leone	20 October 1961
40	Denmark	1 December 1961
41	Mexico	25 January 1962
42	Benin	26 February 1962
43	Niger	20 March 1962
44	Canada	28 March 1962
45	Ethiopia	22 June 1962
46	Tunisia	30 June 1962
47	Mauritania	15 August 1962
48	Japan	9 September 1962
49	Luxembourg	12 September 1962
50	Turkey	11 October 1962
51	Sweden	26 November 1962
52	Chile	26 August 1963
53	Cameroon	13 September 1963
54	Burkina Faso	1963
55	Pakistan	1963
56	Algeria	24 January 1964
57	Kuwait	12 March 1964
58	Argentina	8 September 1964
59	Iraq	18 October 1964
60	Syria	29 November 1964
61	Spain	10 February 1965
62	Venezuela	16 March 1965
63	Jordan	17 May 1966
64	Uganda	22 July 1966
65	Tanzania	22 December 1966
66	Austria	1966
67	Democratic Republic of the Congo	1966
68	Kenya	14 June 1967
69	Burundi	28 June 1967
70	Rwanda	28 June 1967
71	Zambia	10 November 1967
72	Libya	26 March 1968
73	Republic of the Congo	1 July 1968
74	Chad	29 August 1968
75	Guyana	8 June 1970
76	Iran	26 April 1971
77	Gambia	6 August 1971
78	Panama	29 March 1973
79	Mauritius	29 October 1973
80	Trinidad and Tobago	1973
81	Bahrain	5 January 1974
82	Guinea-Bissau	12 February 1974
83	Brazil	4 September 1974
84	Peru	8 January 1975
85	Jamaica	30 January 1975
86	Mozambique	25 June 1975
87	Cape Verde	8 July 1975
88	Angola	11 November 1975
89	Gabon	30 October 1976
90	Equatorial Guinea	1977
91	Eswatini	1977
92	Greece	1977
93	Seychelles	4 April 1978
94	Djibouti	7 August 1978
95	Portugal	2 January 1979
96	Lesotho	1 November 1979
97	Malta	30 March 1980
98	Zimbabwe	30 April 1980
99	Oman	17 February 1981
100	Comoros	11 August 1981
101	Laos	15 October 1981
102	Grenada	4 December 1981
103	Malaysia	29 September 1982
104	Philippines	8 October 1982
105	Haiti	10 January 1983
106	Maldives	8 April 1983
107	Thailand	15 April 1983
108	Nicaragua	5 July 1983
109	Bangladesh	27 February 1985
—	Holy See	21 June 1986
—	Sovereign Military Order of Malta	24 June 1986
110	Bolivia	15 December 1987
111	Qatar	1 January 1988
112	Colombia	30 September 1988
113	Sri Lanka	6 August 1991
114	Estonia	10 February 1992
115	Azerbaijan	11 March 1992
116	Belarus	4 April 1992
117	Kazakhstan	4 April 1992
118	Ukraine	4 April 1992
119	Lithuania	27 April 1992
120	Moldova	27 April 1992
121	Armenia	27 August 1992
122	Guatemala	12 February 1993
123	Slovakia	16 March 1993
124	Cambodia	6 June 1993
125	Uzbekistan	24 June 1993
126	Tajikistan	27 December 1993
127	South Africa	16 February 1995
128	United Arab Emirates	2 June 1995
129	Bosnia and Herzegovina	9 April 1996
130	Slovenia	11 December 1996
131	Latvia	17 January 1997
132	North Macedonia	28 November 1997
133	Croatia	8 December 1997
134	Georgia	31 July 1998
135	Namibia	18 September 2002
136	Iceland	14 May 2004
137	Australia	17 June 2004
138	Cyprus	20 December 2005
139	South Korea	28 August 2006
140	Suriname	28 August 2006
141	Montenegro	17 November 2006
142	Botswana	20 April 2007
143	Uruguay	19 June 2007
144	Brunei	8 August 2007
145	Dominican Republic	28 September 2007
146	Costa Rica	1 October 2007
147	Ireland	30 June 2008
148	Fiji	27 January 2011
149	Solomon Islands	11 August 2011
150	Kyrgyzstan	8 September 2015
151	Liechtenstein	11 December 2015
152	Singapore	24 February 2016
153	New Zealand	20 April 2016
154	Nepal	12 May 2016
155	Myanmar	6 June 2017
156	Eritrea	8 February 2019
—	Kosovo	20 February 2020
157	Paraguay	15 June 2021
158	Central African Republic	15 March 2025
159	Monaco	3 April 2025
160	Madagascar	7 April 2026
—	State of Palestine	Unknown
161	Somalia	Unknown

== Bilateral relations ==
Country	Formal Relations Began	Notes
Australia	2004	Both countries established diplomatic relations in 2004: Australia and Guinea share close interests in the mining sector. They are the two largest bauxite producers in the world (see List of countries by bauxite production) and were founding signatories in the 1970s of the (now defunct) International Bauxite Agreement. Australian companies are involved in developing the Guinean mining sector.; Guinea is accredited to Australia, through its embassy in Tokyo.; Australia is accredited to Guinea, through its embassy in Accra, Ghana.
Canada	28 March 1962	Both countries established diplomatic relations on 28 March 1962: Canada is accredited to Guinea from its embassy in Dakar, Senegal.; Guinea has an embassy in Ottawa.
China	4 October 1959	See China–Guinea relations The People's Republic of China and the Republic of Guinea established diplomatic relations on October 4, 1959, making Guinea the first country in Sub-Saharan Africa to establish formal relations with China. China has become heavily dependent upon Guinea for bauxite (aluminum ore) -- Guinea's principal export—consuming half of it.
France	21 January 1959	Both countries established diplomatic relations on 21 January 1959 and appointed M. Nobi Youla as first ambassador of Guinea to France and M. Francis Hure appointed as chargé d'affaires of France to Guinea: France has an embassy in Conakry.; Guinea has an embassy in Paris.
Germany	30 July 1959	Both countries established diplomatic relations on 30 July 1959 See Germany–Guinea relations: Germany has an embassy in Conakry.; Guinea has an embassy in Berlin.
Ghana	1958	Guinea has an embassy in Accra, which was opened in 1958.; Ghana has an embassy in Conakry which is also accredited to Guinea-Bissau.
Indonesia	27 April 1960	Both countries established diplomatic relations on 27 April 1960: Indonesia's embassy in Dakar, Senegal is accredited to Guinea.; Guinea's embassy in Kuala Lumpur, Malaysia is accredited to Indonesia.
Israel	12 January 1959	See Guinea–Israel relations Both countries established diplomatic relations on 12 January 1959. Guinea broke off diplomatic relations with Israel on 12 June 1967 They resumed diplomatic relations on 20 July 2016
Liberia	6 March 1959	Both countries established diplomatic relations on 6 March 1959 when Mr. Edward Peal, the Liberian Ambassador to the Republic of Guinea, presented his credentials to President S. Toure.: Guinea has an embassy in Monrovia, which was opened in 1959.; Liberia has an embassy in Conakry.
Malaysia	1993	Both countries established diplomatic relations in 1993.: Malaysia has an embassy in Conakry.; Guinea has an embassy in Kuala Lumpur.
Mexico	25 January 1962	Both countries established diplomatic relations on 25 January 1962: Guinea is accredited to Mexico from its embassy in Havana, Cuba.; Mexico is accredited to Guinea from its embassy in Abuja, Nigeria.
Serbia	10 November 1959	Both countries established diplomatic relations on 10 November 1959: Serbia is accredited to Guinea, through its embassy in Algiers, Algeria.; Guinea has an embassy in Belgrade.
Somalia		In 2019, Somalia suspended diplomatic relations with Guinea after President Alpha Conde invited Somaliland President Muse Bihi Abdi to visit Guinea. Diplomatic relations were reestablished on 22 September 2024.
South Korea	28 August 2006	Diplomatic relations between the Republic of Korea and Guinea were established on 28 August 2006. The number of South Koreans living in Guinea in 2011 was 70.; Guinea is accredited to South Korea, through its embassy in Tokyo.; South Korea is accredited to Guinea, through its embassy in Dakar, Senegal.
Turkey	11 October 1962	Both countries established diplomatic relations on 11 October 1962: Guinea has an embassy in Ankara.; Turkey has an embassy in Conakry.; Trade volume between the two countries was US$136.7 million in 2019.; There are direct flights from Istanbul to Conakry since January 30, 2017.
United Kingdom	28 May 1959	See Foreign relations of the United Kingdom Guinea established diplomatic relations with the United Kingdom on 28 May 1959.: Guinea maintains an embassy in London.; The United Kingdom is accredited to Guinea through its embassy in Conakry.; Both countries share common membership of the Atlantic co-operation pact, the International Criminal Court, and the World Trade Organization.
United States	13 February 1959	Both countries established diplomatic relations on 13 February 1959 See Guinea – United States relations Guinea became the first French African colony to gain independence, on 2 October 1958, at the cost of the immediate cessation of all French assistance. After a temporary suspension due to nationwide political unrest in early 2007, the Peace Corps program in Guinea resumed operations at the end of July. Prior to the suspension, Peace Corps had more than 100 volunteers throughout the country, and the program is gradually increasing its numbers again. Volunteers work in four project areas: secondary education, environment/agro-forestry, public health and HIV/AIDS prevention, and small enterprise development. Guinea has also had a strong Crisis Corps program through the last few years. The U.S. "condemned" Guinea's "2008 military coup d'etat,"—but had "close relations" with Guinea before the coup, and after "Guinea's presidential elections in 2010"—in support of "democratic reform." However, the U.S. State Department immediately condemned the September 5, 2021 coup d'état, warning against "violence and any extra-constitutional measures, [which] could limit the ability of the United States and Guinea's other international partners to support the country...": Guinea has an embassy in Washington, D.C.; United States has an embassy in Conakry.
Vietnam	9 October 1958	Both countries established diplomatic relations on 9 October 1958: Guinea is the first country in Africa to establish formal diplomatic relations with Vietnam.; Vietnam's embassy in Rabat, Morocco is accredited to Guinea.; Guinea's embassy in Beijing, China is accredited to Vietnam.

== See also ==
- List of diplomatic missions in Guinea
- List of diplomatic missions of Guinea
