= Guinea–Israel relations =

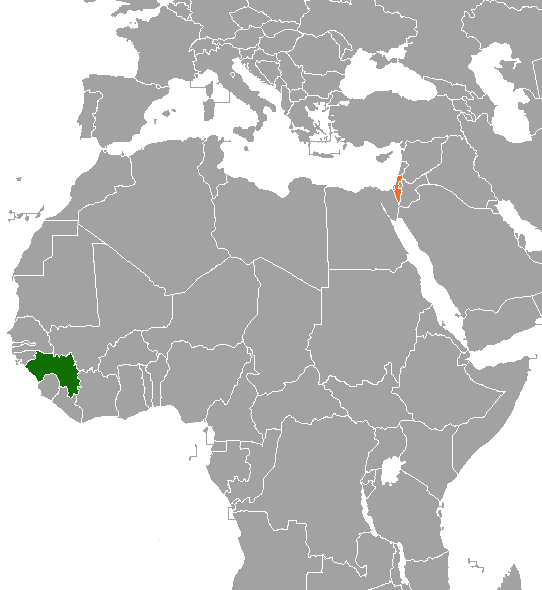
- Guinea: Israel

Guinea–Israel relations refers to the current and historical relationship between Guinea and Israel.

== History ==
Israel had diplomatic relations in 1958. In 1967, Guinea cut ties with Israel. Diplomatic relations were re-established in July 2016.

== Trade relations ==
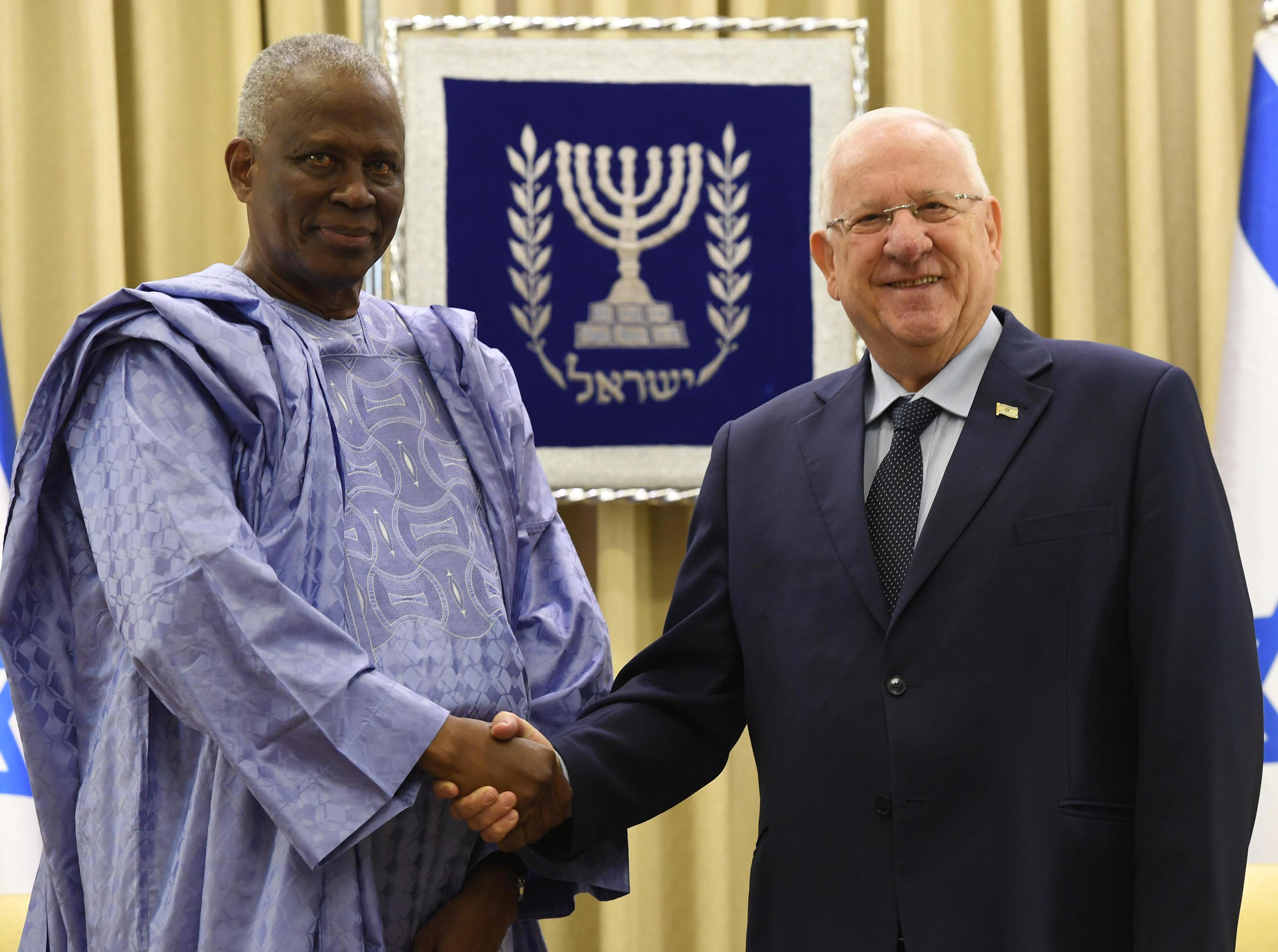
Israeli president Reuven Rivlin and Guinean ambassador to Israel

Israel exported a total of US$4.13 million to Guinea in 2014, mainly electronics and raw materials, while Guinea's exports to Israel totaled US$6.95 million, almost exclusively raw diamonds. In 2015 Israel did not import diamonds from Guinea, bringing imports down to about US$23,000. Israel's exports to Guinea totaled US$3.66 million that year.

== See also ==
- Foreign relations of Guinea
- Foreign relations of Israel
- Economy of Israel
