= Human trafficking in Guinea =

Guinea ratified the 2000 UN TIP Protocol in November 2004.

In 2010, Guinea was a source, transit, and to a lesser extent, a destination country for men, women, and children subjected to trafficking in persons, specifically in the areas of forced labor and forced prostitution. The majority of victims were children, and these incidents of trafficking were more prevalent among Guinean citizens than among foreign migrants living in Guinea. Within the country, girls were largely subjected to involuntary domestic servitude and commercial sexual exploitation, while boys were subjected to forced begging and forced labor as street vendors, shoe shiners, and laborers in gold and diamond mines. Some Guinean men are also subjected to forced agricultural labor within Guinea. Smaller numbers of girls from Mali, Sierra Leone, Nigeria, Ghana, Liberia, Senegal, Burkina Faso, and Guinea-Bissau migrate to Guinea, where they were subjected to involuntary domestic servitude and likely also commercial sexual exploitation. Some Guinean boys and girls were subjected to forced labor in gold mining operations in Senegal, Mali, and possibly other African countries. Guinean women and girls were subjected to involuntary domestic servitude and forced prostitution in Nigeria, Côte d'Ivoire, Benin, Senegal, Greece, and Spain. Chinese women were trafficked to Guinea for commercial sexual exploitation by Chinese traffickers. Networks also trafficked women from Nigeria, India, and Greece through Guinea to the Maghreb and onward to Europe, notably Italy, Ukraine, Switzerland, and France for forced prostitution and involuntary domestic servitude.

== Background ==
Also in 2010, the Government of Guinea did not fully comply with the minimum standards for the elimination of trafficking; however, it made significant efforts to do so, despite limited resources. The government sustained its efforts to investigate alleged trafficking crimes and detain suspected trafficking offenders during the reporting period. The junta, however, made minimal progress toward combating human trafficking in Guinea since coming to power in a coup d'etat in December 2008. While Guinea had an adequate anti-trafficking legal framework, which it had strengthened by enacting the Child Code of 2008, the junta did not report any trafficking prosecutions or convictions for the second year in a row, and protection and prevention efforts remained weak. Therefore, Guinea was placed on the "Tier 2 Watch List" for the third consecutive year. In February 2009, the head of government issued a declaration giving security forces the right to shoot anyone apprehended while trafficking a human being, raising significant human rights concerns. In the same month, the National Committee to Combat Human Trafficking met to evaluate the 2005–2006 National Action Plan and to outline an updated version for 2009–2011 but released no such document to the public. Many ministries claimed involvement in efforts to address trafficking, but the country was severely limited in its ability to address the problem due to budget constraints, capacity limitations, and unclear allocation of law enforcement and social welfare responsibilities.

The US State Department's Office to Monitor and Combat Trafficking in Persons placed the country in "Tier 3" in 2017. The country was placed at Tier 2 in 2023.

== Prosecution (2010) ==
The Government of Guinea did not show progress in its anti-trafficking law enforcement efforts during the reporting period. Guinea prohibits all forms of trafficking in persons through separate statutes. The Child Code of 2008 includes provisions prohibiting all forms of child trafficking, specifically criminalizing child domestic servitude, and allowing NGOs to bring cases to court on behalf of victims. The government, in partnership with NGOs and international organizations, has yet to complete the implementing text for this law, which will prescribe penalties that allow the law to be enforced. Article 337 of the 1998 Penal Code prohibits individuals from entering into agreements that deprive third parties of their liberty, prescribing penalties of five to 10 years' imprisonment and confiscation of any resulting profits. Forced prostitution and child prostitution are criminalized by Article 329 of Guinea's Penal Code, which prescribes six months to two years' imprisonment if the trafficked victim is an adult, and two to five years' imprisonment if the victim is a child. These penalties for sex trafficking of adults are neither sufficiently stringent nor commensurate with penalties prescribed for other serious crimes, such as rape. The government did not prosecute any human trafficking cases during the reporting period, although the Ministry of Justice reported that there were 13 new cases that involved the arrest of at least 40 suspected trafficking offenders during 2009. Of the alleged traffickers, 30 remain in detention. Another 17 trafficking cases from the previous reporting period continue to await prosecution. The government provided only limited specialized training to its officials on the recognition, investigation, and prosecution of human trafficking, due to budget constraints.

== Protection (2010) ==
The government demonstrated weak efforts to protect trafficking victims during the reporting period. The government reportedly referred an unknown number of potential victims to NGOs and international organizations for assistance, though government officials did not demonstrate use of systematic referral procedures or proactive measures to identify victims among vulnerable groups, such as foreign children at worksites. The Ministry of Social Affairs continued to provide assistance to a few hundred children, a small number of whom may be trafficking victims. The government did not offer shelter for trafficking victims, but frequently assisted victims by contacting local and international NGOs directly to coordinate shelter and family reunification cases. The government did not provide trafficking victims with access to legal, medical, or psychological services, and did not subsidize services provided by foreign or domestic NGOs. Foreign trafficking victims do not benefit from permanent residency status or relief from deportation. The government reported that 106 trafficked children were identified by various entities in 2009 but offered no additional data on these children. The government occasionally provided victims refuge in jails when no alternative was available. The government encouraged trafficking victims to assist in the investigation and prosecution of their traffickers, as long as the victim was at least 12 years of age. At the government's invitation, two such victims, one of whom was a child, separately discussed their cases on national television in April and June 2009, though their traffickers had not been brought to justice; this raises concerns for the security and well-being of the victims.

== Prevention (2010) ==
The Government of Guinea demonstrated minimal efforts to conduct anti-trafficking or educational campaigns during the reporting period. The head of the junta, however, gave several speeches highlighting the importance of combating human trafficking. The government did not monitor immigration or emigration patterns for evidence of trafficking. The government did not take steps to reduce the demand for commercial sex acts.
