= Telephone numbers in Guinea =

- Country: Guinea
- Continent: Africa
- Country code: +224
- International access: 00

The following are the telephone codes in Guinea.

== Calling formats ==
To call in Guinea, the following format is used:

xxx xxxx Calls within an area code

y xxx xxxx Calls inside Guinea in city centers

+224 y xxx xxxx Calls outside Guinea

== List of area codes in Guinea ==
LIST OF AREA CODES
Area/City	Area Code
Boké	3031
Boussoura	3046
Conakry	3041, 3043, 3045, 3047
Dalaba	3069
Faranah	3081
Fria	3024
Guéckédou	3097
Kamsar	3032
Kankan	3071
Kindia	3061
Kissidougou	3098
Labé	3051
Macenta	3094
Mamou Kagoma	3068
N'Zérékoré	3091
Pita	3053
Sangoya	3042
Télimélé	30613

== See also ==
- Telecommunications in Guinea
