= Tabounsou FC =

Guinean football club

- Full name: Tabounsou FC
- Ground: Stade de Coléah, Conakry
- Capacity: 5,000
- League: Guinée Championnat National

Tabounsou FC is a football (soccer) club from Guinea. They are members of the Guinée Championnat National.
