= 2009 Guinea mine collapse =

Historic mine collapse in Guinea

Coordinates: 10.2167°N 11.3167°W

In the 2009 Guinea mine collapse in May 2009, a cave-in at a gold mine in Siguiri, Guinea, killed 20 people, injured five and left ten missing.
