= HIV/AIDS in Guinea =

HIV/AIDS is growing issue in Guinea, with an overall HIV prevalence of greater than 1% at present. Around have of all government ministries have designed plans to address HIV/AIDS.

== Prevalence ==
HIV is spreading quickly in Guinea. The estimated total number of adults and children living with HIV in 2003 was 140,000 (with a low estimate of 51,000 and a high estimate of 360,000), up from an estimated 110,000 in 2001, indicating an increase in adult prevalence of 0.4% (from 2.8 to 3.2%) over the two-year period.

HIV prevalence varies by region. Surveillance surveys conducted among women seeking antenatal care in 2001 and 2002 show higher rates of HIV in urban areas than in rural areas (3.2 vs. 2.6%, respectively). Prevalence was highest in Conakry (5%) and in the cities of the Forest Guinea region (7%) bordering Ivory Coast, Liberia, and Sierra Leone.

HIV is spread primarily through multiple-partner intercourse. Men and women are at nearly equal risk for HIV, with young people aged 15 to 24 most vulnerable. Surveillance figures from 2001 to 2002 show high rates among commercial sex workers (42%), active military personnel (6.6%), truck drivers and bush taxi drivers (7.3%), miners (4.7%), and adults with tuberculosis (8.6%).

Several factors are fueling the HIV/AIDS epidemic in Guinea. They include unprotected sex, multiple sexual partners, illiteracy, endemic poverty, unstable borders, refugee migration, lack of civic responsibility, and scarce medical care and public services.

== National response ==
As one of the poorest nations in the world, Guinea faces daunting social, economic, and political problems. Until 2002, the national response to the epidemic was weak, primarily because of a lack of governmental commitment, poor leadership, and inadequate resources. Since then, high-level political commitment and will to fight HIV/AIDS have been strengthened, but little money has been allocated to health, and most government-backed projects are funded primarily with external financing.

The National AIDS Control Program was reorganized in 2002, partly to meet the requirements for receipt of a $20 million loan from the World Bank to fight HIV/AIDS. Government response to the epidemic is now directed through the Office of the Prime Minister. The National AIDS Commission directs general activities, whereas the National Program for the Care, Support, and Prevention of Sexually Transmitted Infections (STIs) and HIV/AIDS manages clinical activities (i.e., overseeing surveillance and testing, and providing counseling, care, and support to individuals living with HIV/AIDS).

About half of the government ministries have designed action plans to address HIV/AIDS in their work. The Ministry of Communication, for example, is charged with managing behavior change communication efforts, and the Ministry of Planning supervises epidemiological research.

== See also ==
- Health in Guinea
