= Postage stamps and postal history of Guinea =

A 1962 stamp of Guinea

This is a survey of the postage stamps and postal history of Guinea.

The Republic of Guinea (Fr: République de Guinée) is a country in West Africa formerly known as French Guinea. Conakry is the capital, the seat of the national government, and the largest city. Guinea forms a crescent by curving from its western border on the Atlantic Ocean toward the east and the south. Its northern border is shared with Guinea-Bissau, Senegal, and Mali, the southern one with Sierra Leone, Liberia, and Côte d'Ivoire. The Niger River arises in Guinea and runs eastward.

== French Guinea ==
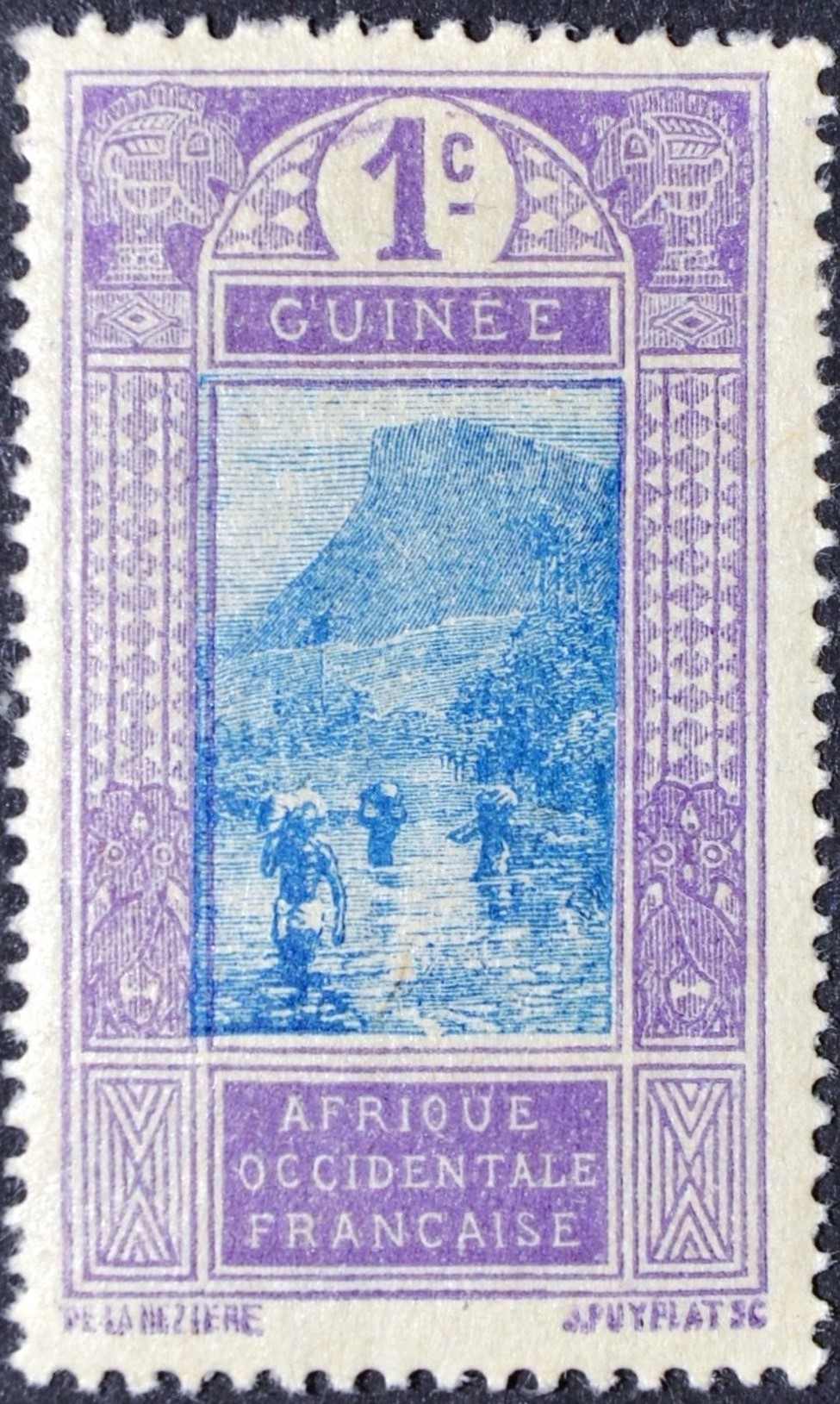
A 1913 stamp of French Guinea

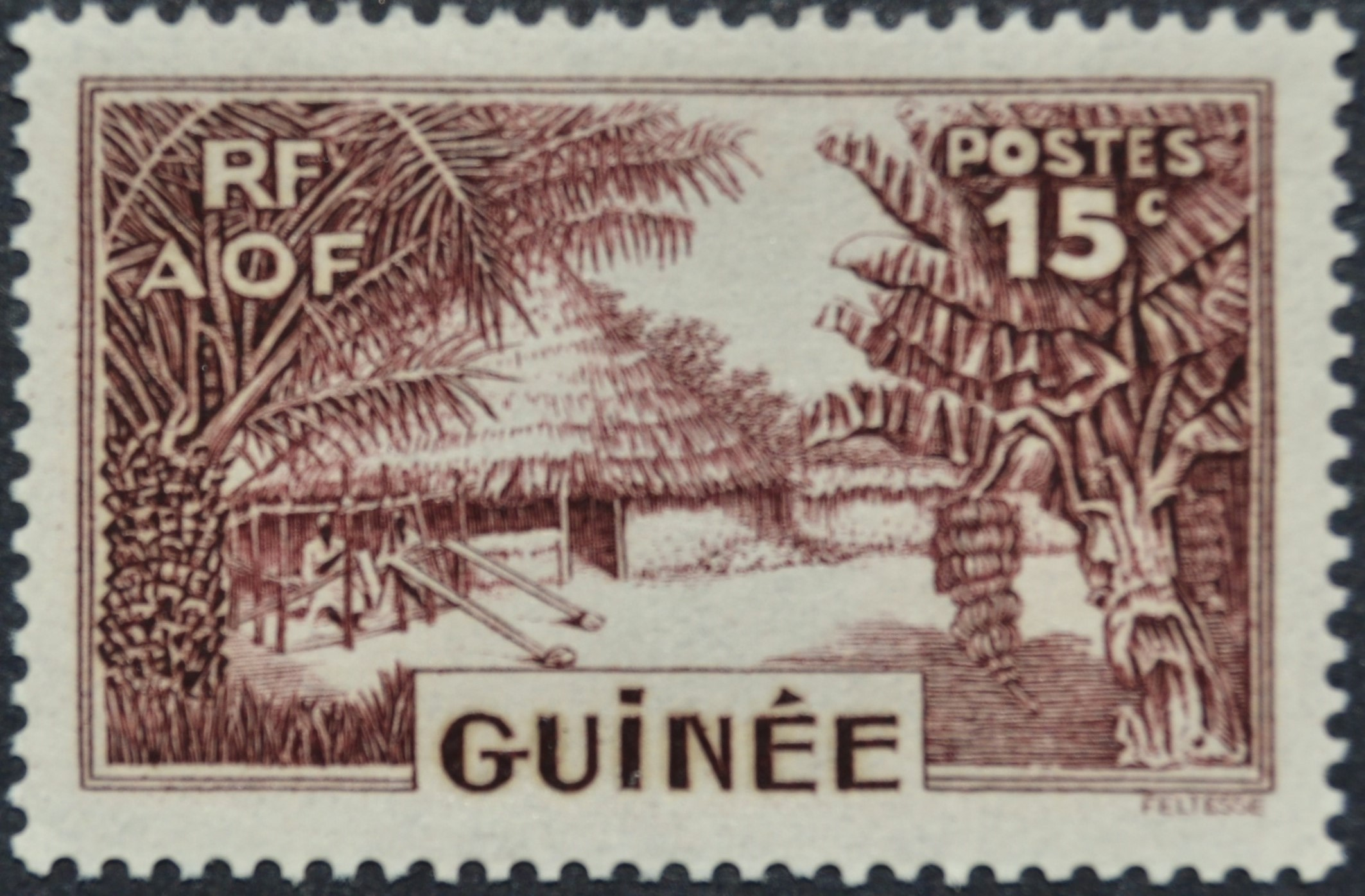
A 1938 stamp of French Guinea

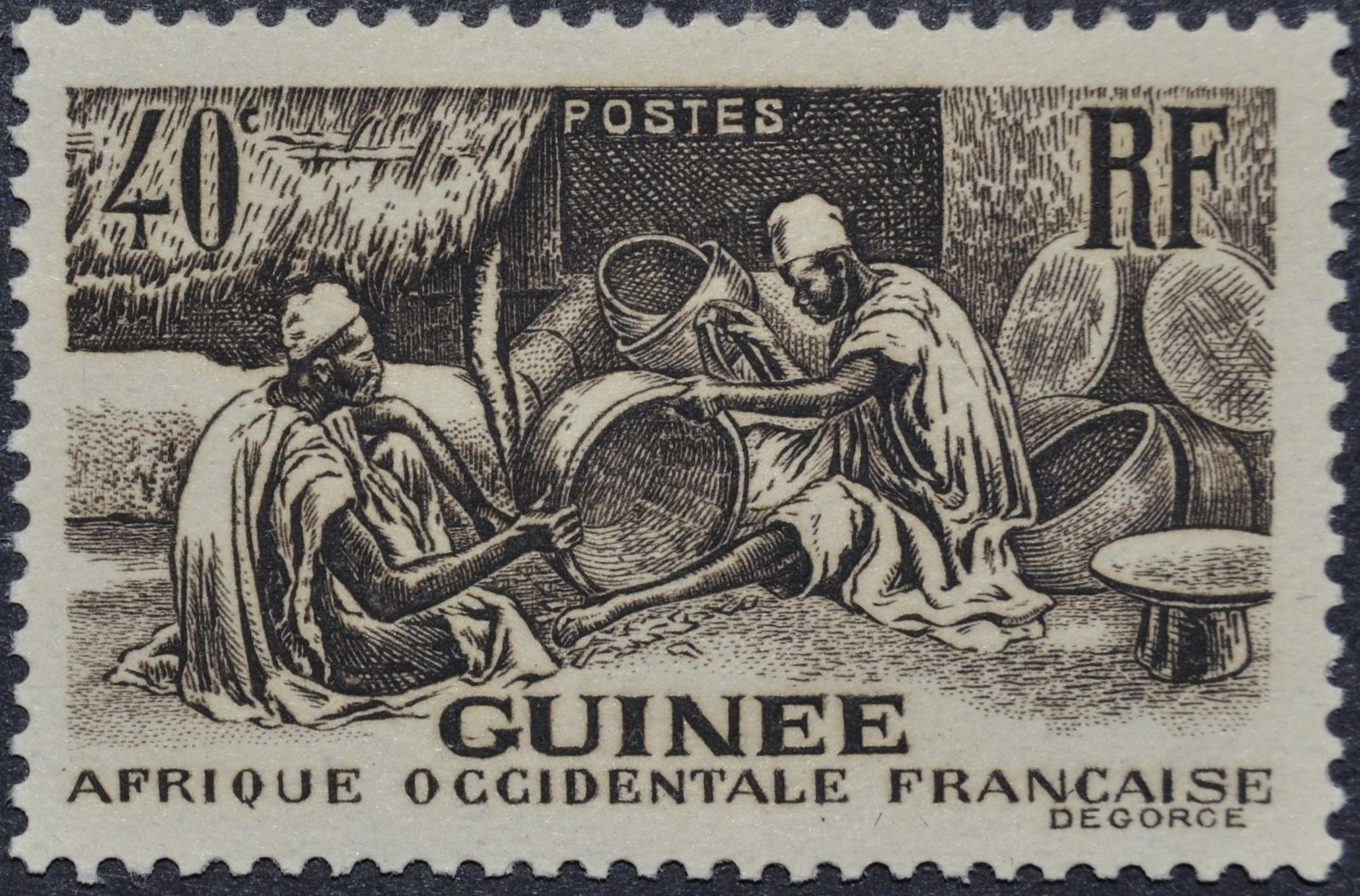
A 1938 stamp of French Guinea

Prior to 1892, the coastal portions of French Guinea was administered from the French colony of Senegal, and used French Colonies general stamps and the stamps of Senegal. As French Guinea was made into a separate colony, the first series of 13 stamps was issued in 1892.

== French West Africa ==
French Guinea was joined into French West Africa with other French colonies in 1895.

Stamps were issued for French Guinea until being replaced by the stamps of French West Africa in 1943. Between 1944 and independence in 1958, French Guinea used the stamps of French West Africa.

== Republic ==
The first stamps of the Republic of Guinea were issued on 5 January 1959 marking independence.

== See also ==
- Postage stamps of French West Africa
