= List of diplomatic missions in Guinea =

This is a list of diplomatic missions in Guinea. The capital Conakry currently hosts 40 embassies. Other countries accredit their ambassadors on a non-resident basis from the capitals of other West African countries, such as Abidjan, Abuja, Accra, and Dakar.

Honorary consulates, trade offices, and cultural offices are excluded from this listing.

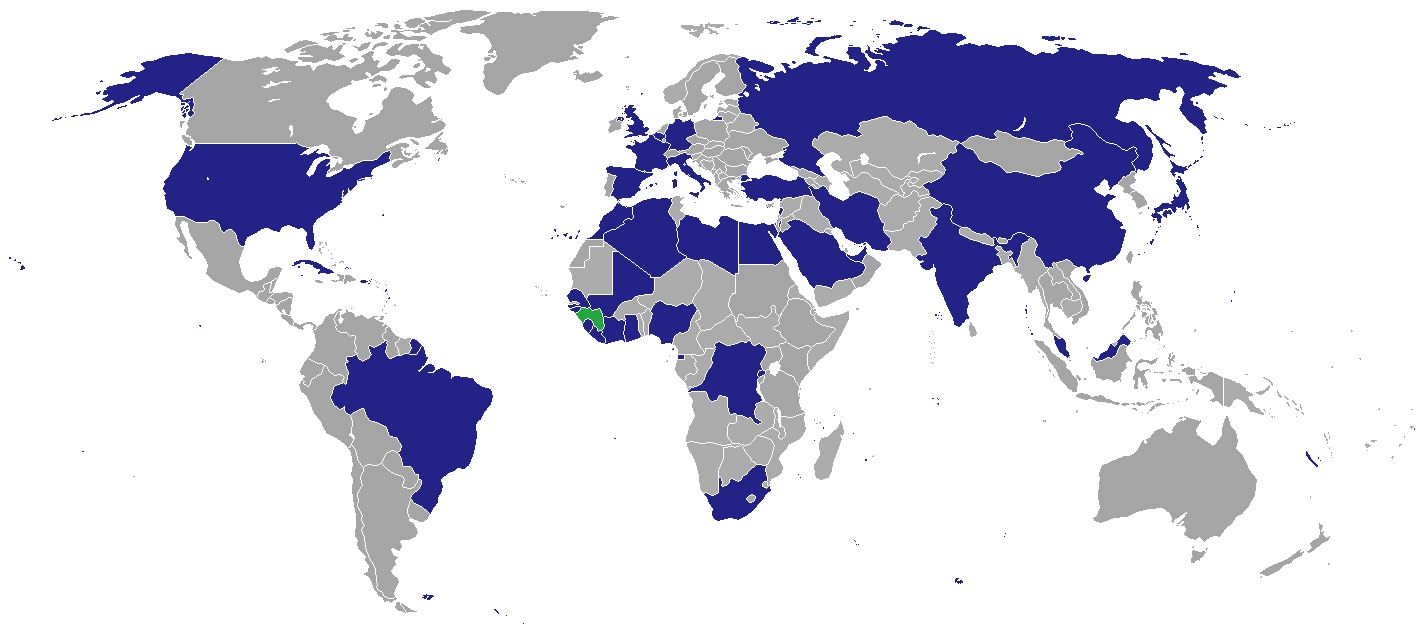
Map of diplomatic missions in Guinea

== Embassies in Conakry ==
1. Algeria
2. Angola
3. Belgium (Note: To be closed at the end of 2027.)
4. Brazil
5. China
6. Cuba
7. Congo-Kinshasa
8. Egypt
9. Equatorial Guinea
10. France
11. Gabon
12. Germany
13. Ghana
14. Guinea-Bissau
15. Holy See
16. India
17. Iran
18. Italy
19. Ivory Coast
20. Japan
21. Lebanon
22. Liberia
23. Libya
24. Malaysia
25. Mali
26. Morocco
27. Nigeria
28. Palestine
29. Russia
30. Rwanda
31. Saudi Arabia
32. Senegal
33. Sierra Leone
34. South Africa
35. Sovereign Military Order of Malta
36. Spain
37. Turkey
38. United Arab Emirates
39. United Kingdom
40. United States

== Other posts in Conakry ==
- European Union (Delegation).

== Non-resident embassies accredited to Guinea ==
=== Resident in Abuja, Nigeria ===
1. Argentina
2. Botswana
3. Burundi
4. Kenya
5. Mexico
6. Slovakia
7. Tanzania
8. Trinidad & Tobago

=== Resident in Accra, Ghana ===
1. Australia
2. Denmark
3. Norway

=== Resident in Dakar, Senegal ===
1. Austria
2. Canada
3. Colombia
4. Czechia
5. Greece
6. Indonesia
7. Israel
8. Mauritania
9. Netherlands
10. Oman
11. Poland
12. Portugal
13. South Korea
14. Romania
15. Thailand
16. Ukraine
17. Zimbabwe

=== Resident elsewhere ===
1. Croatia (Paris)
2. Dominican Republic (Rabat)
3. Iceland (Reykjavík)
4. Ireland (Freetown)
5. Pakistan (Abidjan)
6. Panama (Havana)
7. Philippines (Rabat)
8. Serbia (Algiers)
9. Seychelles (Addis Ababa)
10. Sweden (Stockholm)
11. Switzerland (Abidjan)
12. Tunisia (Bamako)

=== Uncomfirmed ===
- Central African Republic (Abidjan)
- Cameroon (Abidjan)
- Jordan (Algiers)
- Malta (Valletta)
- New Zealand (Addis Ababa)
- Peru (Rabat)
- Vietnam (Rabat)
- Yemen (Rabat)

== Closed missions ==
Host city	Sending country	Mission	Year closed	Ref.
Conakry	Hungary	Embassy	1987	
Conakry	Indonesia	Embassy	1973	
Conakry	Mongolia	Embassy	1967	
Conakry	North Korea	Embassy	2023	
Conakry	Polish People's Republic	Embassy	1981	
Conakry	Romania	Embassy	1999	
Conakry	Switzerland	Embassy	1992	
Conakry	Ukraine	Embassy	2012	
Conakry	Vietnam	Embassy (Note: Resident in Rabat, Morocco)	1986	
	Federal Republic of Yugoslavia	Embassy	2001	

== See also ==
- Foreign relations of Guinea
- List of diplomatic missions of Guinea
- Visa requirements for Guinean citizens
