= Germany–Guinea relations =

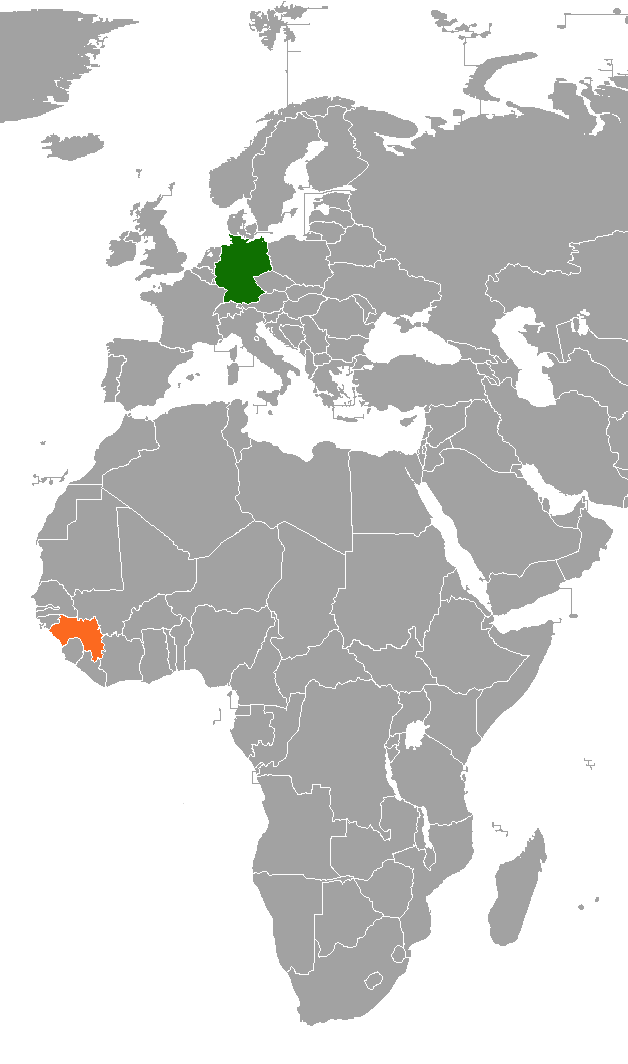

- Germany: Guinea

The quality of Germany–Guinea relations has been subject to some fluctuations since bilateral relations were established in 1958. Due to its long history of cooperation in development policy, the Federal Republic of Germany enjoys a good reputation among the Guinean public.

== History ==
Otto Friedrich von der Groeben led a colonial expedition to the Guinea coast in 1682 on behalf of Frederick William, Elector of Brandenburg. He published his travelogues in 1692, bringing the region to the attention of a wider German-speaking audience for the first time. In the late 19th century, Frederick Colin established trading posts along the Dubréka River in what is now Guinea, and in 1884 requested a letter of protection for his possessions from Imperial Chancellor Otto von Bismarck. A year later, Colin founded the company Fr. Colin, Deutsch-Afrikanisches Geschäft in Frankfurt am Main, and on January 6, 1885, Kaiser Wilhelm I issued an official letter of protection from the Reich for the Dubréka colony the Dembia colony (See also Kapitaï and Koba). However, in December 1885, the German Empire recognized France's sovereignty over the protectorates acquired by Colins in the Franco-German Protocol.

After Guinea's independence, diplomatic relations with the Federal Republic of Germany (FDR) were established in 1958. After Guinea sent a diplomat to East Berlin in the German Democratic Republic (GDR) in 1960, a diplomatic scandal ensued and the Federal Republic withdrew its ambassador to Guinea under the Hallstein Doctrine. To settle the crisis, Guinea then denied ever having sent an ambassador. In 1962, the Guinea national team played its first international match against the GDR national football team, losing 3–2. In 1970, Guinea finally established diplomatic relations with the GDR, which caused the FRG to break off relations. Five years later, relations with the FRG resumed.

After German reunification, bilateral relations developed positively, but deteriorated under the presidency of Lansana Conté. In 2008, Germany suspended development cooperation with Guinea following a military coup. After democratic elections were held in 2010 and 2013, relations between the two countries improved significantly. In 2014, the two countries concluded an investment protection and promotion agreement. In 2019, a migration agreement was signed between the two countries.

== Economic relations ==
In 2021, the bilateral trade volume was 210 million euros, placing Guinea 118th in the ranking of Germany's trading partners. Germany imports critical raw materials from Guinea, such as bauxite, and in return exports mainly industrial and chemical products to the country. All imports from Guinea to Germany are duty-free and quota-free, with the exception of armaments, as part of the Everything but Arms initiative of the European Union.

== Development cooperation ==
Germany has been providing development aid in Guinea since the 1970s (with interruptions). German development policy focuses on basic education and health. It also implements measures to promote employment. Other programs focus on improving governance and environmental protection. The German Adult Education Association runs adult literacy programs in the country, and the Weltfriedensdienst (World Peace Service) is involved in conflict prevention. In addition, various private initiatives are active in the country.

== Cultural relations ==
Despite a positive image of Germany, German culture is relatively unknown in Guinea. Some Guineans have studied in the Federal Republic of Germany and also in the GDR. In recent years, interest in German education has increased in Guinea. A partnership exists between the University of Conakry and the University of Bremen.

== Migration ==
In 2021, there were just under 19,000 Guineans living in Germany.

== Diplomatic missions ==
- Germany has an embassy in Conakry.
- Guinea has an embassy in Berlin.
