= Sankaran FC =

Guinean football club

- Full name: Sankaran Football Club
- Ground: Stade Régional de Faranah; Faranah, Guinea
- Capacity: 1,000
- League: Guinée Championnat National
| Home colours | Away colours |

Sankaran FC is a football club based in Faranah, Guinea. The team plays in the Guinée Championnat National.

== Stadium ==
Currently the team plays at the 1000 capacity Stade Régional de Faranah.
