= Telecommunications in Guinea =

Telecommunications in Guinea include radio, television, fixed and mobile radio, and the Internet.

The people of Guinea are among the poorest in West Africa and this reality is reflected in the development of the country's telecommunications environment. Radio is the most important source of information for the public in Guinea, and the only one to reach the entire country.

There is a single government-owned radio network, a growing number of private radio stations, and one government TV station. The fixed telephone system is inadequate, with just 18,000 lines to serve the country's 10.5 million inhabitants in 2012. Internet usage is very low, reaching just 1.5% of the population in 2012.

== Radio and television ==
Radio remains the most important source of information for the public, and the only one to reach the entire country. The government licensed the country's first private broadcasters in 2006.

- Radio stations:
  - one state-run radio broadcast station, Radio Télévision Guinéenne (RTG); RTG also operates several stations in rural areas; there are a steadily increasing number of privately owned radio stations, nearly all in the capital, Conakry; and about a dozen community radio stations (2011);
  - 4 AM, 8 FM, and 3 shortwave (1998).
- Radios: 357,000 (1997).
- Television stations:
  - one state-run TV station, Radio Télévision Guinéenne (RTG); foreign TV programming is available via satellite and cable subscription services (2011);
  - 6 TV stations (1997).
- Television sets: 85,000 (1997).

=== State censorship ===
The government maintains marginal control over broadcast media, the media laws promulgated following the 2010 democratic transition have not been implemented, and there are reports of state censorship through journalist harassment and station closures. For example:

- On 26 August 2012, the National Communication Council (CNC) suspended private radio station Liberte FM, based in the Forest Region city of N’Zerekore. The closure prevented Liberte FM from covering protests announced by opposition leaders for the following day. The national government allowed Liberty FM to reopen 48 hours later, after the protests concluded.
- On 1 October 2012, Electricity of Guinea cut service to Espace FM, host of the investigative reporting radio program "The Big Mouths." The utility company claimed that Espace FM and its sister station, Sweet FM, collectively owed nearly 150 million GNF ($21,521) for electricity bills, despite the station's possession of payment receipts. Both stations were forced to operate on expensive generator power.
- The government has been accused of penalizing stations and journalists who broadcast items criticizing government officials and their actions. Some journalists accuse government officials of attempting to influence the tone of their reporting with inappropriate pressure and bribes. Some journalists also hire bodyguards, and many practice self-censorship.

== Telephones ==
- Calling code: +224
- International call prefix: 00
- Main lines:
  - 18,000 lines in use, 115th in the world (2012);
  - 11,000 lines in use (1995).
- Mobile cellular:
  - 12,394 million lines,(2019).
  - 790,000 lines (2007).
- Telephone system: inadequate system of open-wire lines, small radiotelephone communication stations, and a new microwave radio relay system; Conakry reasonably well-served; coverage elsewhere remains inadequate and large companies tend to rely on their own systems for nationwide links; fixed-line teledensity less than 1 per 100 persons; mobile-cellular subscribership is expanding and exceeds 40 per 100 persons (2011).
- Satellite earth stations: 1 Intelsat (Atlantic Ocean) (2011).
- Communications cables: African Coast to Europe (ACE) submarine communications cable, which has a landing point in Conakry, links 23 countries along the west coast of Africa and on to Portugal and France.

== Internet ==
- Top-level domain: .gn
- Internet users:
  - 4,563 million users; 38% of the population (2019),
  - 3,131 million users; 27% of the population (2017),
  - 2,147 million users; 20% of the population (2014)
- Fixed broadband: 762 subscriptions, 183rd in the world; less than 0.05% of population, 189th in the world (2012).
- Wireless broadband: Unknown (2012).
- Internet hosts: 15 hosts, 223rd in the world (2012).
- IPv4: 4,096 addresses allocated, less than 0.05% of the world total, 0.4 addresses per 1000 people (2012).
- Internet service providers: several ISPs including SKYVISON, ETI Bull, and Vizocom.

=== Internet censorship and surveillance ===
There are no government restrictions on access to the Internet or credible reports that the government monitors e-mail or Internet chat rooms without judicial oversight.

The constitution and law provide for freedom of speech and of the press, but the government, nevertheless, restricts these freedoms. Libel against the head of state, slander, and false reporting are subject to heavy fines. Some journalists accuse government officials of attempting to influence the tone of their reporting with inappropriate pressure and bribes. Some journalists hire bodyguards, and many practice self-censorship. Although the constitution and law provide for the inviolability of the home and legal searches require judicial search warrants, police reportedly ignore legal procedures in the pursuit of criminal suspects or when it serves their personal interests.

== See also ==
- Radio Télévision Guinéenne (RTG), the national broadcaster of Guinea.
