= AS Batè Nafadji =

Guinean football club

- Full name: AS Batè Nafadji
- Ground: Stade de Coléah, Conakry
- Capacity: 5,000
- League: Guinée Championnat National
Home colours

AS Batè Nafadji is an association football club from Guinea. They are members of the Guinée Championnat National.
