= List of universities in Guinea =

This is a list of universities in Guinea.

== Universities in Guinea ==
- Gamal Abdel Nasser University of Conakry
- Kofi Annan University of Guinea
- Université Privée Thierno Amadou Diallo
- Université Mercure Internationale
- Université Général Lansana Conté de Sonfonia

== See also ==
- Education in Guinea
