= Education in Guinea =

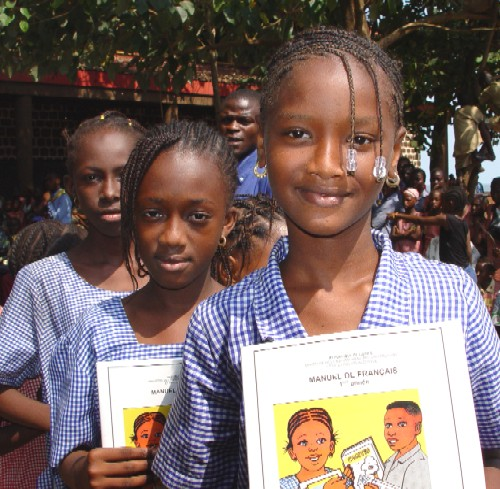
Schoolgirls in Conakry, Guinea

Primary education in Guinea is compulsory for 6 years. In 1997, the gross primary enrolment rate was 54.4 percent and the net primary enrolment rate was 41.8 percent. Public education in Guinea is governed by three ministries: The Ministry for Pre-University Education and Literacy; The Ministry for Technical Education and Occupational Training; and the Ministry for Higher Education, Scientific Research and Innovation.

The Human Rights Measurement Initiative (HRMI) finds that Guinea is fulfilling only 60.7% of what it should be fulfilling for the right to education based on the country's level of income. HRMI breaks down the right to education by looking at the rights to both primary education and secondary education. While taking into consideration Guinea's income level, the nation is achieving 74.7% of what should be possible based on its resources (income) for primary education but only 46.6% for secondary education.

Mrs Diallo Hadja Aicha Bah is a former Education minister in Guinea. in 1996, Hadja Aicha Bah joined UNESCO as Director of the Division for the Basic Education. Mrs Diallo is known as an active leading campaigner for girls and women education in Guinea.

== See also ==
- List of universities in Guinea
