= List of diplomatic missions of Guinea =

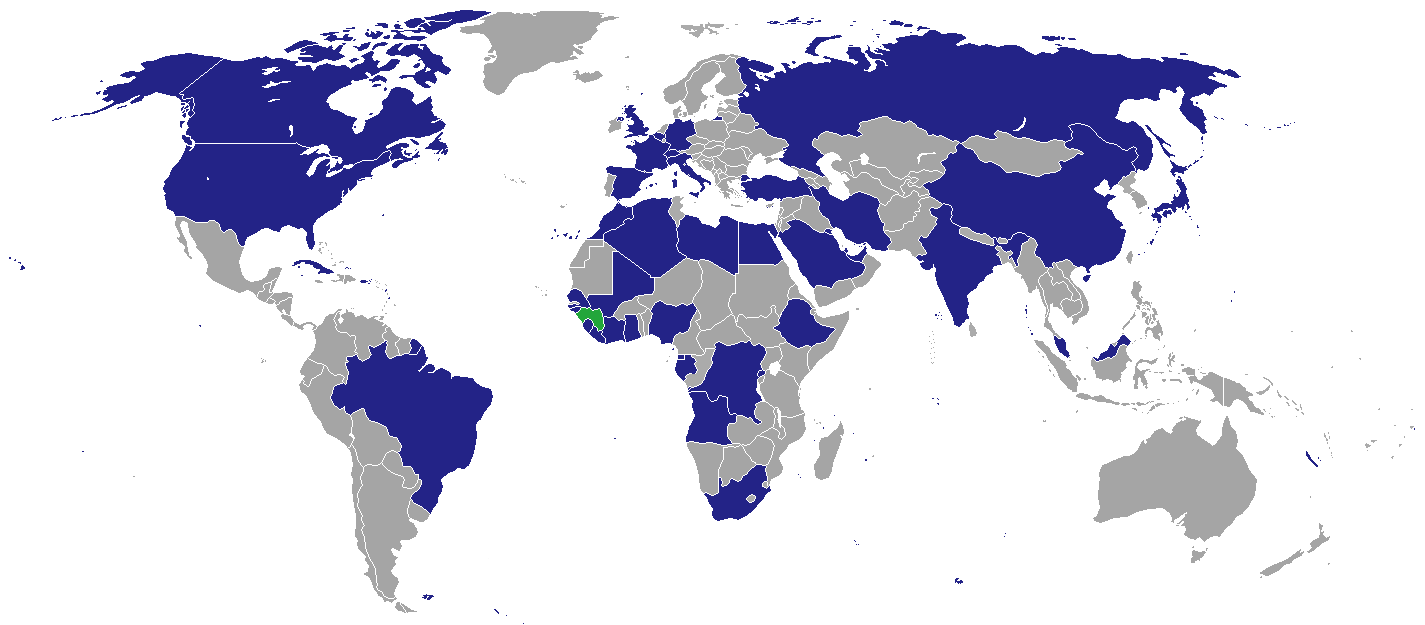
Countries with Guinean diplomatic missions

This is a list of diplomatic missions of Guinea, excluding honorary consulates. Guinea's relations with other countries, including with West African neighbors, have improved steadily since 1985. Guinea reestablished relations with France and Germany in 1975, and with neighboring Côte d'Ivoire and Senegal in 1978. Guinea has been active in efforts toward regional integration and cooperation, especially regarding the Organisation of African Unity and the Economic Organization of West African States (ECOWAS). Guinea takes its role in a variety of international organizations seriously and participates in their deliberations and decisions.

== Current missions ==
=== Africa ===
Host country	Host city	Mission	Concurrent accreditation	Ref.
Algeria	Algiers	Embassy	Countries: Tunisia	
Angola	Luanda	Embassy	Countries: Malawi; Zambia; Zimbabwe	
Congo-Kinshasa	Kinshasa	Embassy	Countries: Burundi	
Egypt	Cairo	Embassy	Countries: Eritrea; Cyprus; Lebanon; Jordan; Palestine; South Sudan; Sudan; Syria	
Equatorial Guinea	Malabo	Embassy	Countries: São Tomé and Príncipe	
Ethiopia	Addis Ababa	Embassy	Countries: Djibouti; Kenya; Somalia; Tanzania; Uganda; International Organizations: United Nations; United Nations Environment Programme; United Nations Human Settlements Programme	
Gabon	Libreville	Embassy	Countries: Cameroon; Chad; Congo-Brazzaville; Central African Republic	
Ghana	Accra	Embassy	Countries: Togo	
Guinea-Bissau	Bissau	Embassy		
Ivory Coast	Abidjan	Embassy		
Liberia	Monrovia	Embassy		
Libya	Tripoli	Embassy		
Mali	Bamako	Embassy	Countries: Burkina Faso; Niger	
Morocco	Rabat	Embassy		
Morocco	Dakhla	Consulate-General		
Nigeria	Abuja	Embassy	Countries: Benin	
Rwanda	Kigali	Embassy		
Senegal	Dakar	Embassy	Countries: Cape Verde; Gambia; Mauritania	
Sierra Leone	Freetown	Embassy		
South Africa	Pretoria	Embassy	Countries: Botswana; Comoros; Eswatini; Lesotho; Madagascar; Mauritius; Mozambique; Namibia; Seychelles	

=== Americas ===
Host country	Host city	Mission	Concurrent accreditation	Ref.
Brazil	Brasília	Embassy	Countries: Argentina; Chile; Colombia; Guyana; Paraguay; Peru; Uruguay	
Canada	Ottawa	Embassy		
Cuba	Havana	Embassy	Countries: Bahamas; Barbados; Belize; Bolivia; Colombia; Dominican Republic; Ecuador; El Salvador; Guatemala; Grenada; Haiti; Honduras; Mexico; Saint Kitts and Nevis; Saint Lucia; Trinidad and Tobago; Venezuela	
United States	Washington, D.C.	Embassy	Countries: Costa Rica	

=== Asia ===
Host country	Host city	Mission	Concurrent accreditation	Ref.
China	Beijing	Embassy	Countries: Cambodia; Laos; North Korea; Vietnam	
India	New Delhi	Embassy	Countries: Bangladesh; Bhutan; Maldives; Myanmar; Nepal; Sri Lanka	
Iran	Tehran	Embassy	Countries: Afghanistan; Kazakhstan; Kyrgyzstan; Pakistan; Tajikistan; Turkmenistan; Uzbekistan	
Japan	Tokyo	Embassy	Countries: Australia; Fiji; New Zealand; Philippines; Singapore; South Korea	
Malaysia	Kuala Lumpur	Embassy	Countries: Brunei; Indonesia; Papua New Guinea; Thailand	
Kuwait	Kuwait City	Embassy		
Qatar	Doha	Embassy		
Saudi Arabia	Riyadh	Embassy	Countries: Iraq; Oman; Yemen; International Organizations: Organisation of Islamic Cooperation	
Saudi Arabia	Jeddah	Consulate-General	Countries: Iraq; Oman; Yemen; International Organizations: Organisation of Islamic Cooperation	
Turkey	Ankara	Embassy	Countries: Azerbaijan; Georgia; Romania; Ukraine	
United Arab Emirates	Abu Dhabi	Embassy	Countries: Bahrain	

=== Europe ===
Host country	Host city	Mission	Concurrent accreditation	Ref.
Belgium	Brussels	Embassy	Countries: Luxembourg; Netherlands; International Organizations: European Union; Organisation of African, Caribbean and Pacific States; Organisation for the Prohibition of Chemical Weapons	
France	Paris	Embassy	Countries: Israel; Monaco; Portugal; International Organizations: UNESCO	
Germany	Berlin	Embassy	Countries: Czechia; Denmark; Estonia; Holy See; Latvia; Liechtenstein; Lithuania; Norway; Poland; Slovakia; Sweden	
Italy	Rome	Embassy	Countries: Albania; Bosnia and Herzegovina; Croatia; Greece }; Montenegro; North Macedonia; Slovenia; International Organizations: Food and Agriculture Organization; International Fund for Agricultural Development; World Food Programme	
Portugal	Lisbon	Consulate-General		
Russia	Moscow	Embassy	Countries: Armenia; Belarus; Finland; Hungary; Moldova; Mongolia	
Spain	Madrid	Embassy	Countries: Malta	
United Kingdom	London	Embassy	Countries: Iceland; Ireland	

=== Multilateral organisations ===
Organization	Host city	Host country	Mission	Concurrent accreditation	Ref.
United Nations	New York City	United States	Permanent Mission		
United Nations	Geneva	Switzerland	Permanent Mission	Countries: Austria; Switzerland	

== Gallery ==
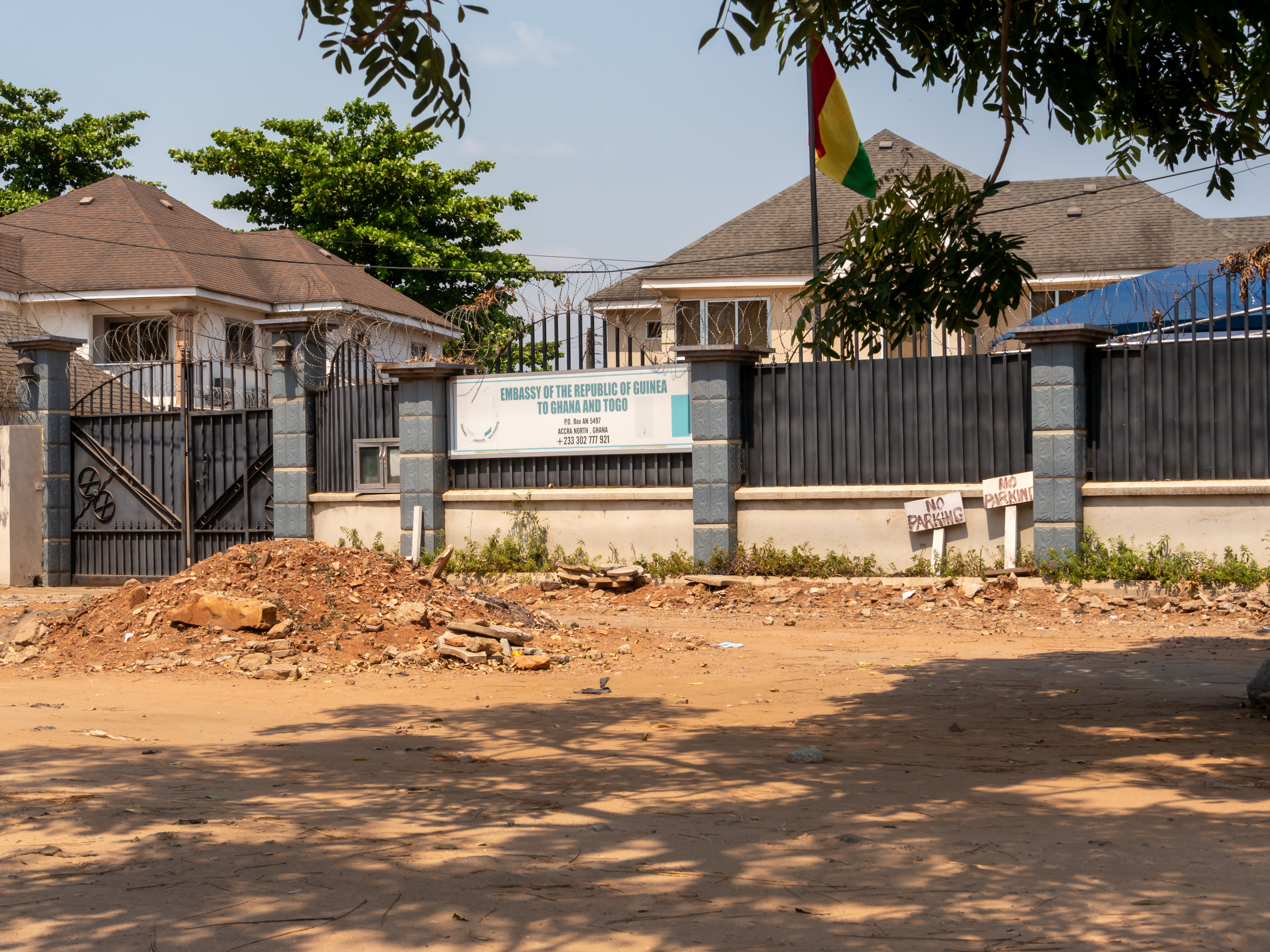
Embassy in Accra

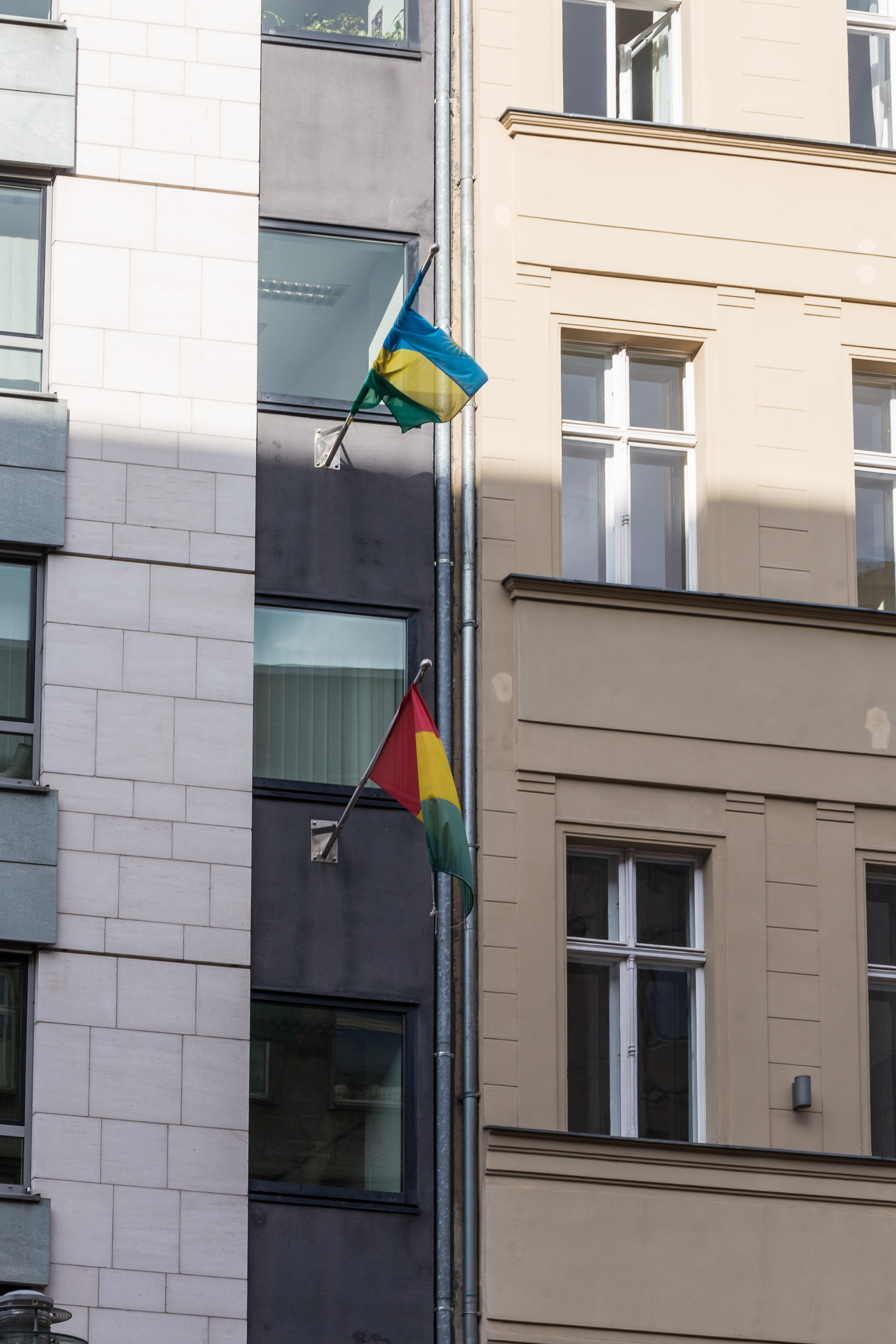
Embassy in Berlin

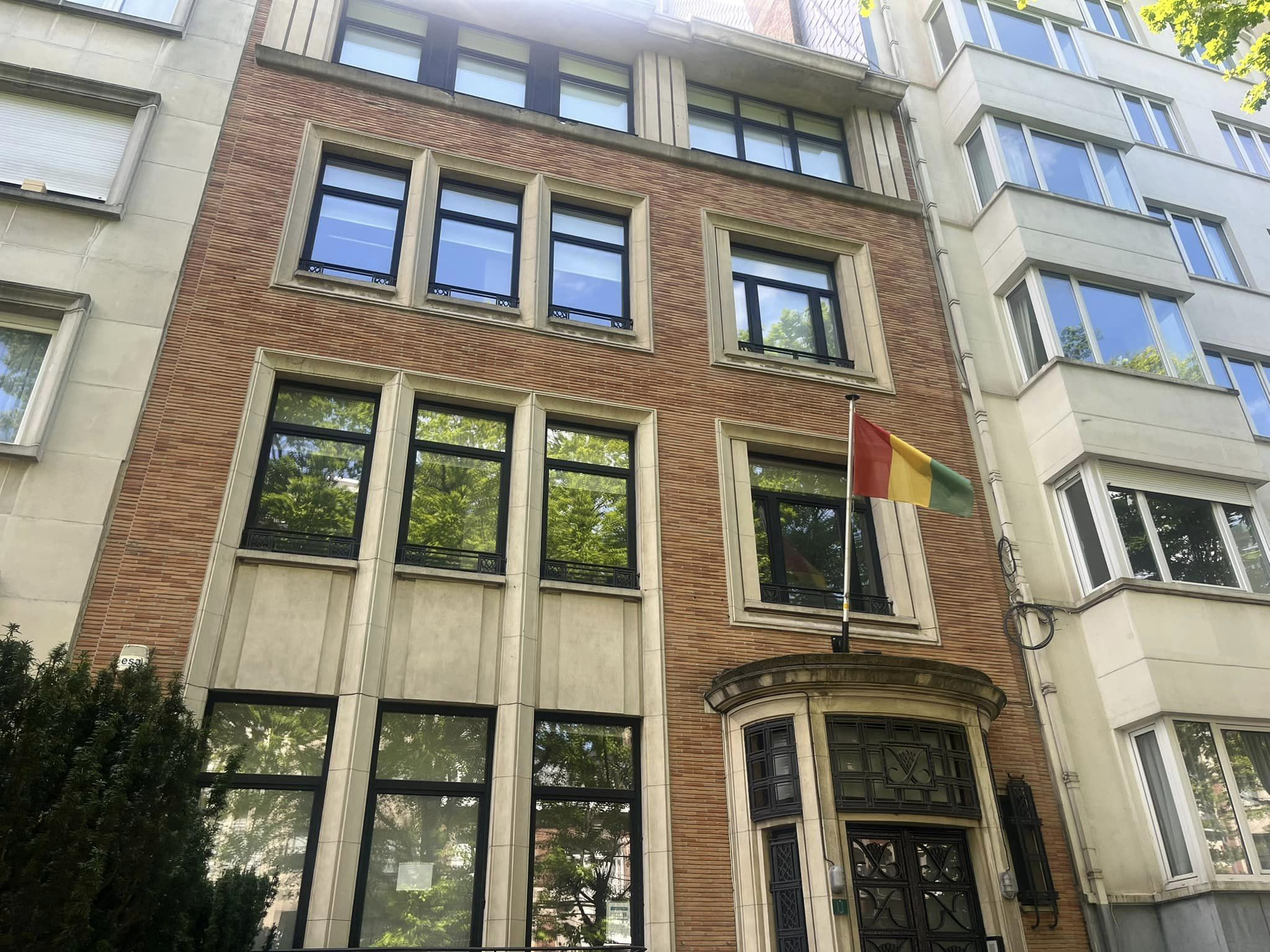
Embassy in Brussels

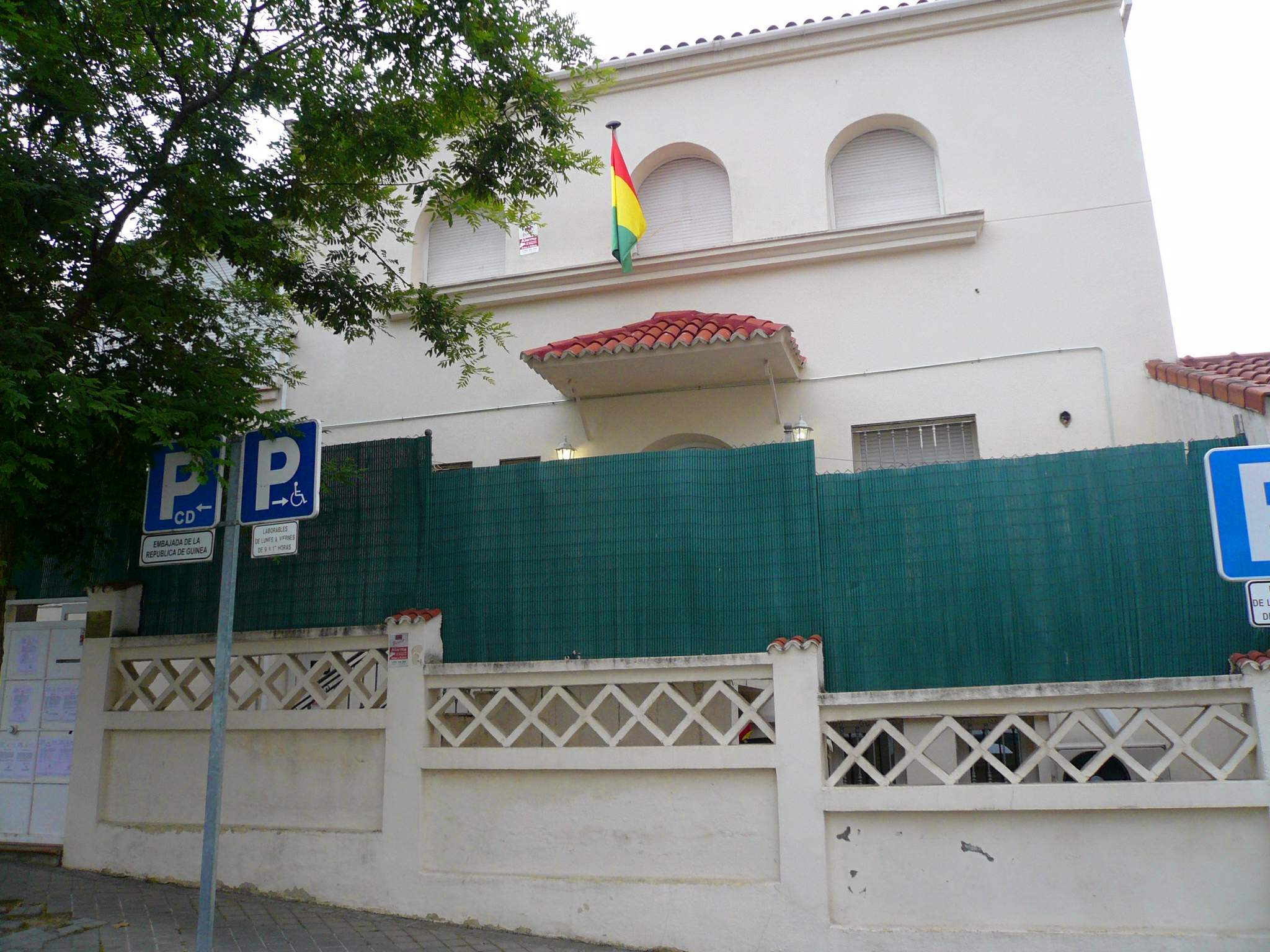
Embassy in Madrid

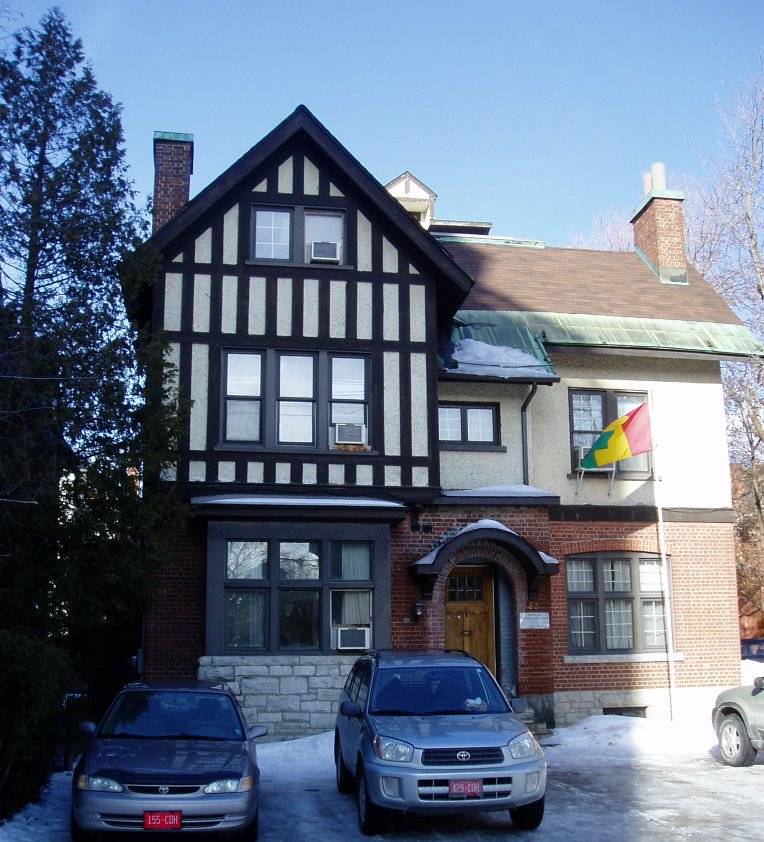
Embassy in Ottawa

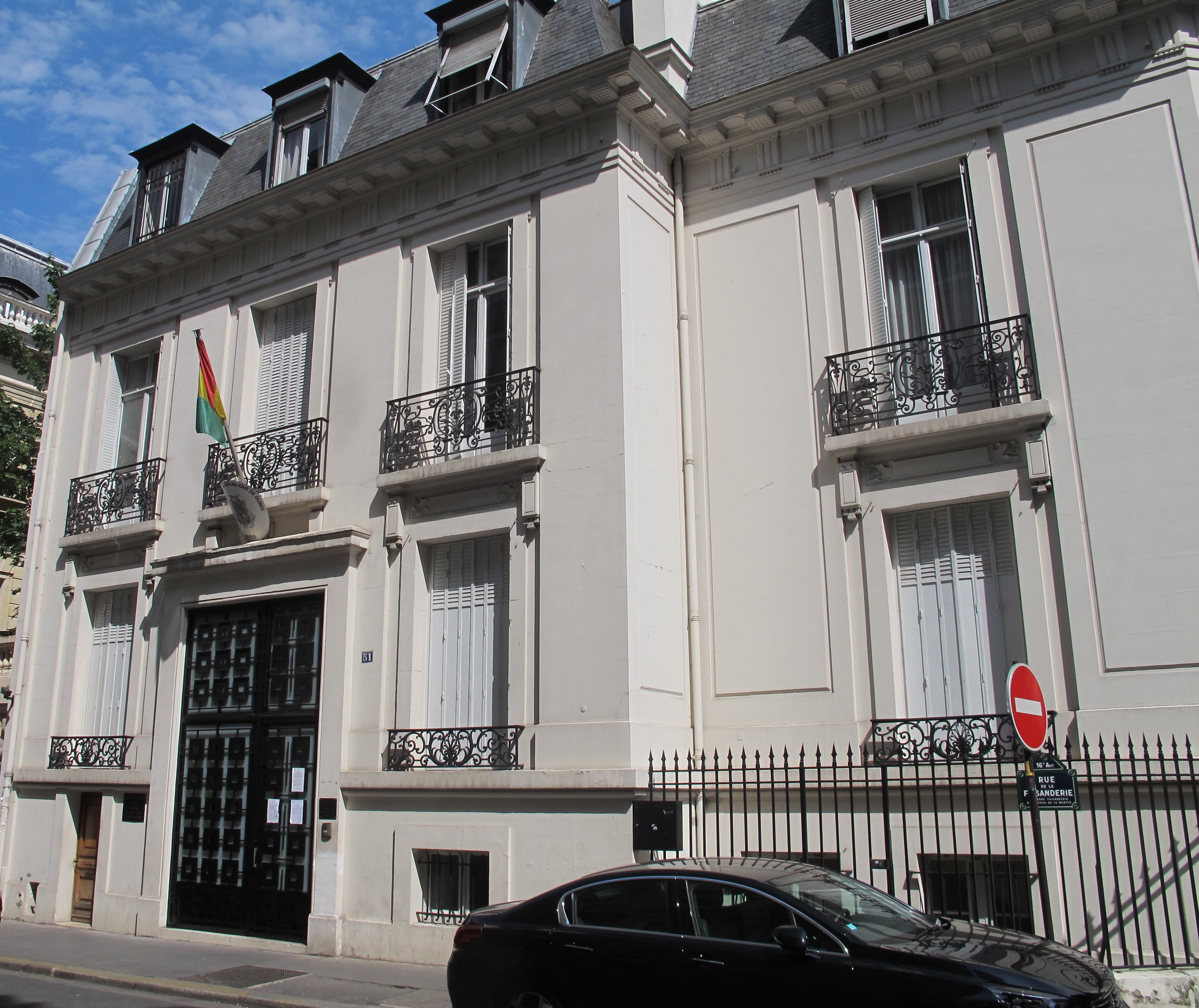
Embassy in Paris

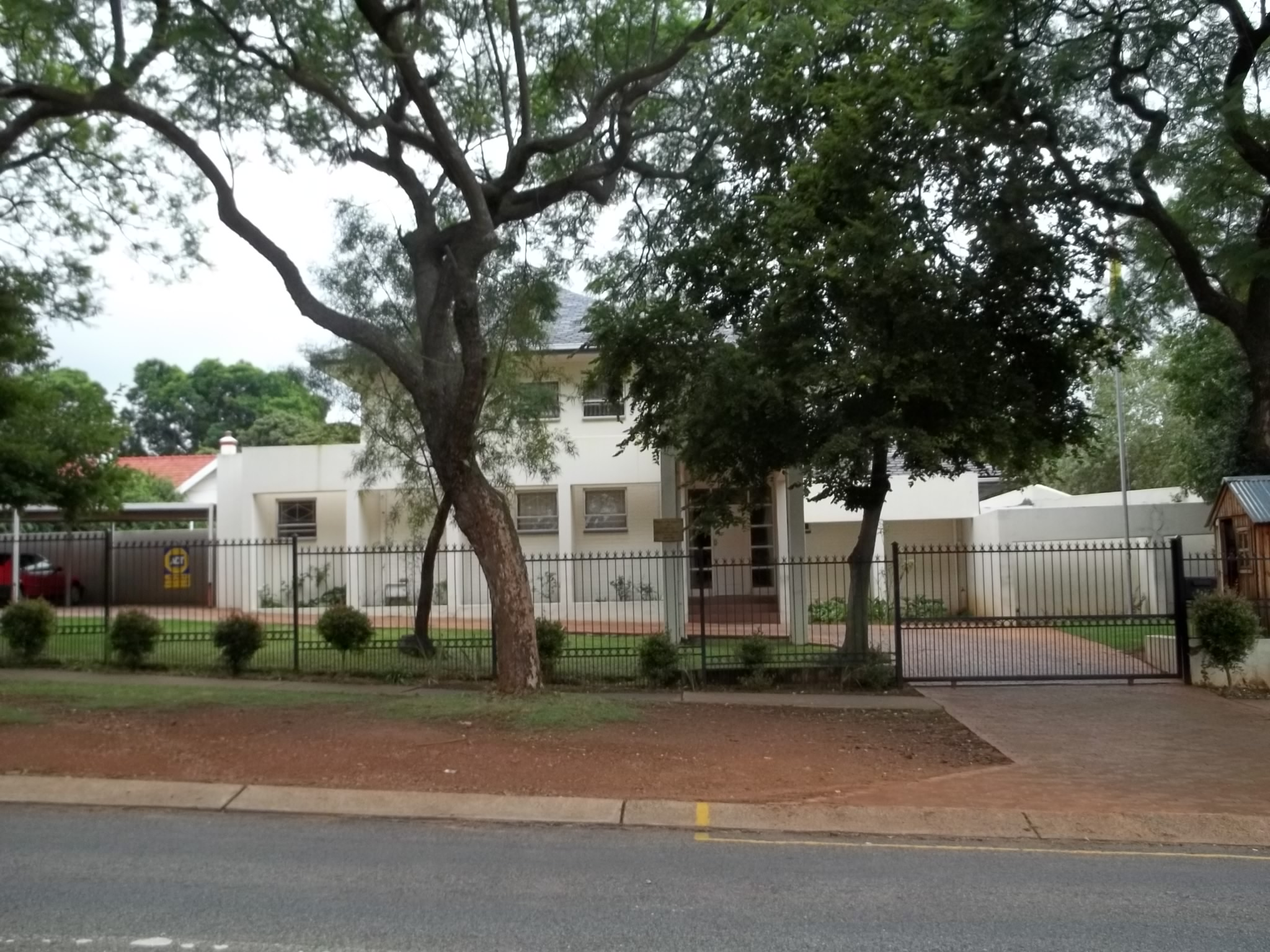
Embassy in Pretoria

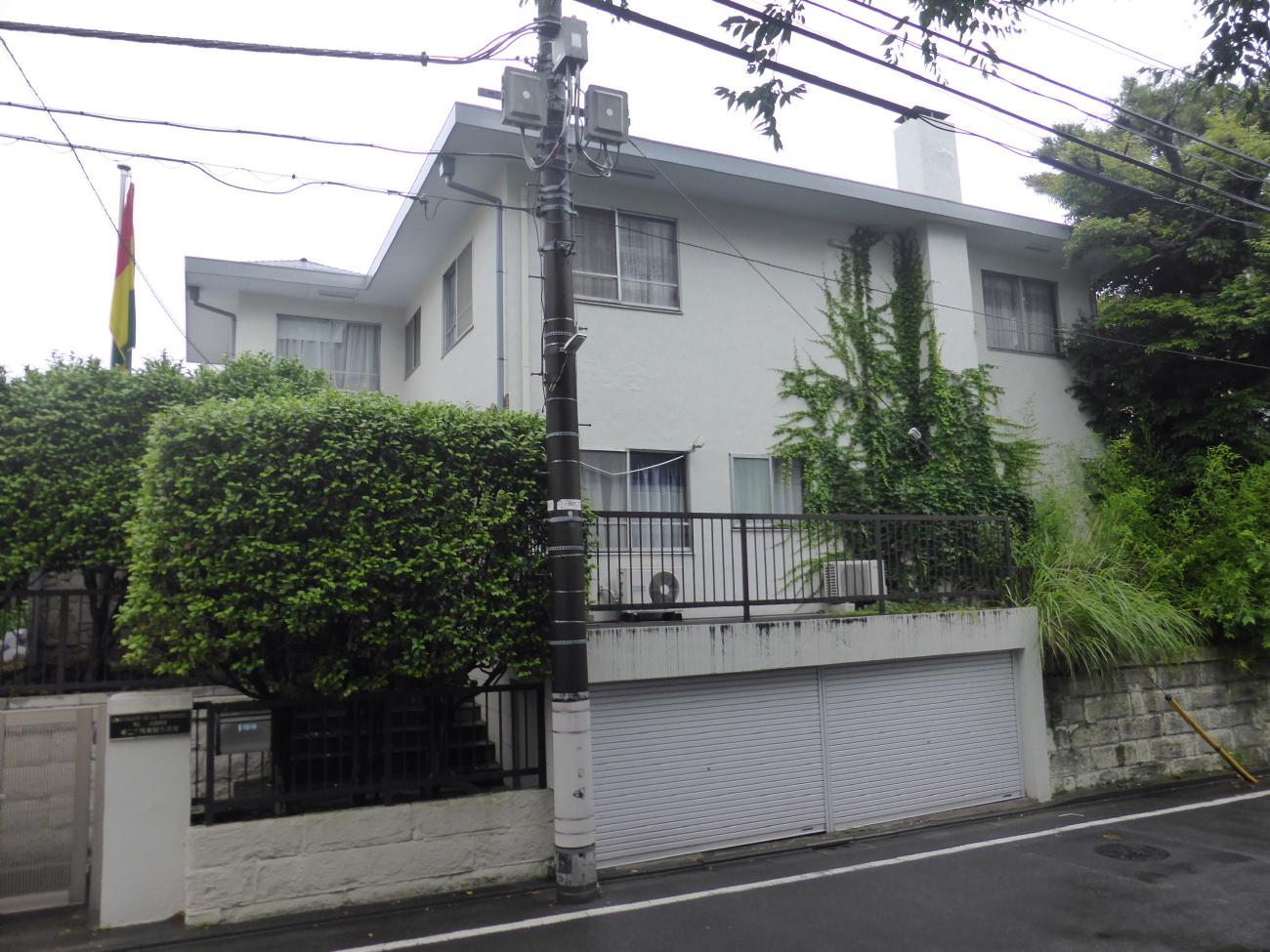
Embassy in Tokyo

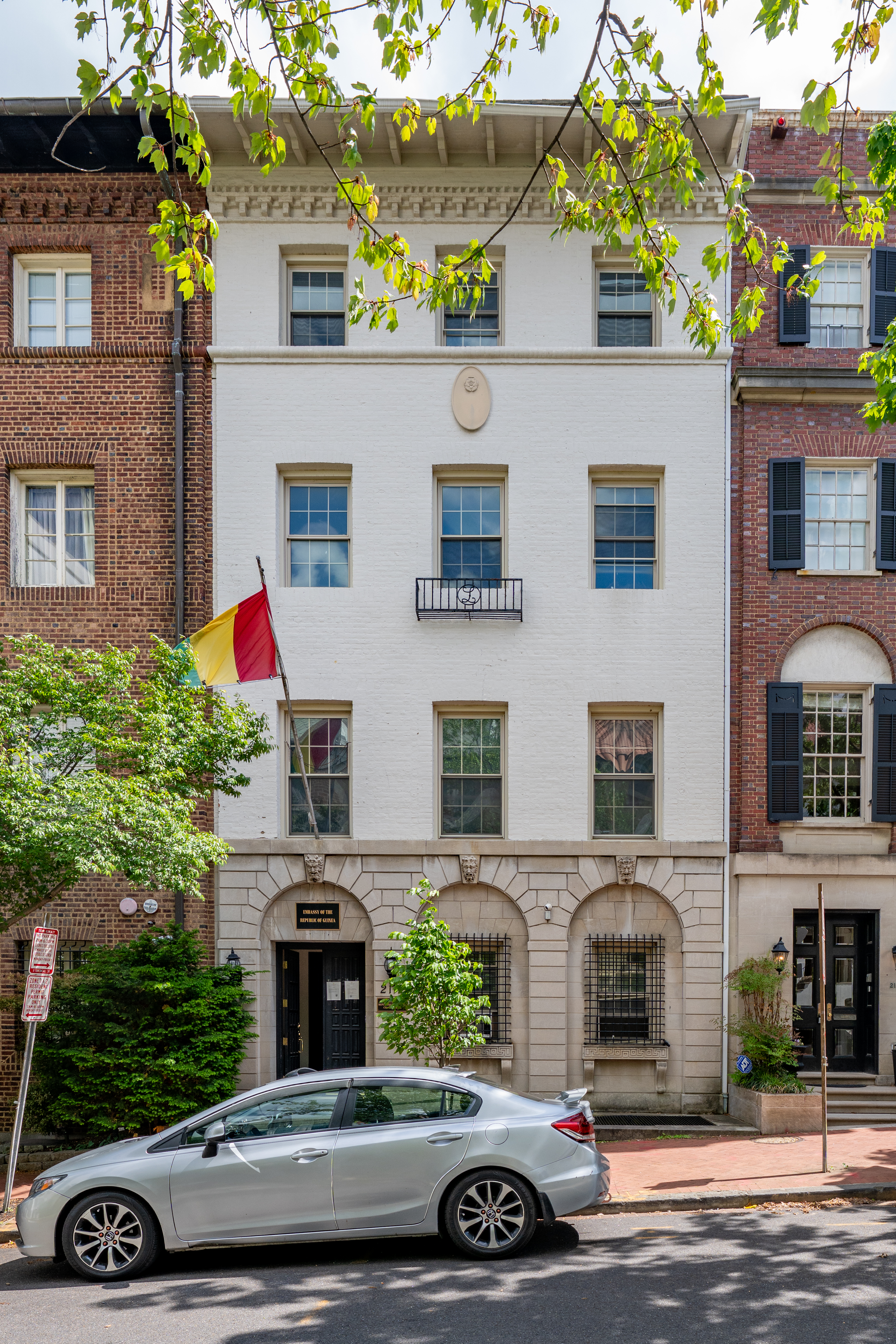
Embassy in Washington, D.C.

== Closed missions ==
=== Europe ===
Host country	Host city	Mission	Year closed	Ref.
Socialist Republic of Romania	Bucharest	Embassy (Note: Resident in Belgrade, Serbia)	1988	
Serbia	Belgrade	Embassy	2023	

== See also ==
- Foreign relations of Guinea
- List of diplomatic missions in Guinea
- Visa policy of Guinea
