= Camayenne Sofa =

Guinean musical groups

- Origin: Guinea Conakry
- Years active: 1974-1975

Camayenne Sofa were one of the most influential popular music groups in Guinea, West Africa in the 1970s. They recorded on the national Syliphone label.

== Discography ==
- La Percee (Syllart)
- Attaque (Syllart)
- A Grands Pas
