= .gn =

Top-level Internet domain for Guinea

- Introduced: 9 August 1994
- TLD type: Country code top-level domain
- Status: Active
- Registry: Agence Nationale de Digitalisation de l’Etat
- Sponsor: Centre National des Sciences Halieutiques de Boussoura
- Intended use: Entities connected with Guinea
- Actual use: Gets some use in Guinea
- Registration restrictions: Must have presence in Guinea and demonstrable intent to use name; two name servers must be in different networks
- Structure: Registrations are at third level beneath second-level categories
- Registry website: ande.gov.gn/dns-gn/

.gn is the country code top-level domain (ccTLD) for Guinea. A local contact is required to register a domain name under .gn.

== Second level domains ==
Domain	Intended purpose
.com.gn	Commercial organizations
.org.gn	Non-commercial organizations
.gov.gn	Government
.edu.gn	Academic organizations
.net.gn	Network infrastructure
