= Agriculture in Guinea =

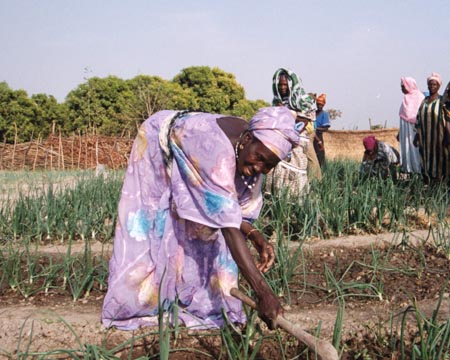
An onion field in Dinguiraye Prefecture.

In Guinea in western Africa, agriculture accounts for 19.7% of the total GDP and employs 84% of the economically active population.

== Crops ==
In 1999, the main subsistence crops were manioc, 812,000 tons; rice, 750,000 tons; sweet potatoes, 135,000 tons; yams, 89,000 tons; and corn, 89,000 tons. The economy of Guinea also depends on cash crops such as sugarcane, citrus fruits, bananas, pineapples, peanuts, palm kernels, coffee, and coconuts. In 1999, an estimated 429,000 tons of plantains, 220,000 tons of sugarcane, 215,000 tons of citrus fruits, 150,000 tons of bananas, 174,000 tons of peanuts, 52,000 tons of palm kernels, and 18,000 tons of coconuts were produced.

=== Coffee ===
Coffee production in Guinea has fluctuated over time due to illegal coffee smuggling that affected the industry before the country's reforms in the early 1980s. In 1999, production of coffee beans was estimated at 21,000 tons, compared to 14,000 tons on average annually from 1979 to 1981.

== Agricultural history ==
Attempts at price fixation affected agriculture in Guinea in the 1970s and 1980s since the independence. The French has reduced their influence in plantations and the removal of the French tariff had affected production in the 1970s at a time when drought was prevalent. During the 1970s and early 1980s, food production declined and agricultural exports fell markedly. In 1984, a year when drought seriously affected Guinea, 186,000 tons of cereal had to be imported to prevent starvation.

Since 1985, free market policies have advocated the decentralisation of state owned plantations and government owned agricultural produce towards localized private smallholders. There are as many as 500,000 operating in Guinea by the late 1990s which reportedly yielded twice as much as the agricultural output than state owned agriculture did in the 1970s, even without financial assistance.

== Child labor ==
In 2013, the U.S. Department of Labor estimated the percentage of working children aged 5 to 14 in the agricultural sector to 76.2%. The department's report on the worst forms of child labor included the production of cashews, cocoa and coffee among other activities. In December 2014, the Department's List of Goods Produced by Child Labor or Forced Labor included Guinea among 74 other countries where instances of child labor were observed. In the report, 5 goods are listed under Guinea; cashews, cocoa and coffee constitute the major agricultural products attributed to the country.

== See also ==
- Economy of Guinea
