= List of protected areas in Guinea =

The protected areas of Guinea include national parks, a strict nature reserve, a faunal reserve, and classified forests.

== National parks ==
- Badiar National Park, also a biosphere reserve
- Haut Niger National Park, also a biosphere reserve

== Strict nature reserves ==
- Mount Nimba Strict Nature Reserve, also a biosphere reserve and World Heritage Site

== Biosphere reserves ==
- Ziama Massif Biosphere Reserve

== Faunal reserves ==
- Tristao Faunal Reserve

== Classified forests ==
- Badiar-sud Classified Forest
- Bagata Classified Forest
- Bakoun Classified Forest
- Balayan-Souroumba Classified Forest
- Bambaya Classified Forest
- Bani Classified Forest
- Banie Classified Forest
- Bantarawel Classified Forest
- Baro Classified Forest
- Beauvois Classified Forest
- Bellel Classified Forest
- Binti Classified Forest
- Botokoly Classified Forest
- Boula Classified Forest
- Chutes de Tinkisso Classified Forest
- Colline-Macenta Classified Forest
- Counsignaki Classified Forest
- Damakhania Classified Forest
- Dara-Labe Classified Forest
- Darou-salam Classified Forest
- Diécké Classified Forest
- Diogoure Classified Forest
- Dixinn Classified Forest
- Djimbera (Bantiguel) Classified Forest
- Dokoro Classified Forest
- Fello Digue Classified Forest
- Fello Sounga Classified Forest
- Fello-Selouma Classified Forest
- Fitacouna Classified Forest
- Fougoumba Classified Forest
- Foye-Madinadian Classified Forest
- Galy Classified Forest
- Gambi Classified Forest
- Gangan Classified Forest
- Gban Classified Forest
- Gouba Classified Forest
- Goulgoul-Kankande Classified Forest
- Grandes Chutes Classified Forest
- Gueme Sangan Classified Forest
- Gueroual Classified Forest
- Guirila Classified Forest
- Haute-Komba Classified Forest
- Kabela Classified Forest
- Kakrima Classified Forest
- Kala Classified Forest
- Kaloum Classified Forest
- Kambia Classified Forest
- Khabitaye Classified Forest
- Koni Classified Forest
- Konkoure Fetto Classified Forest
- Kora Classified Forest
- Koumban-Kourou Classified Forest
- Kourani-Oulete- Dienne Classified Forest
- L'Amana Classified Forest
- Laine Classified Forest
- Lefarani Classified Forest
- Loffa Classified Forest
- Mafou Classified Forest
- Makona Classified Forest
- Milo Classified Forest
- Mirire Classified Forest
- Miti Kambadaga Classified Forest
- Mombeya Classified Forest
- Mt. Balan Classified Forest
- Mt. Balandougou Classified Forest
- Mt. Konossou Classified Forest
- Mt. Kouya Classified Forest
- Mt. Loura Classified Forest
- Mt. Tetini Classified Forest
- Mt. Yonon Classified Forest
- N'Dama Classified Forest
- N'Guidou Classified Forest
- Nialama (or Nyalama) Classified Forest
- Sources du Niger Classified Forest
- Nono Classified Forest
- Ouladin Classified Forest
- Paradji Classified Forest
- Pic de Fon Classified Forest
- Pic de Tibe Classified Forest
- Pinselli Classified Forest
- Sala Classified Forest
- Sambalankan Classified Forest
- Selly-Koro Classified Forest
- Sere Classified Forest
- Serima Classified Forest
- Sierra-Fore Classified Forest
- Sincery-Ourssa Classified Forest
- Sobory Classified Forest
- Souarela Classified Forest
- Sources de Kindia Classified Forest
- Souti-Yanfu Classified Forest
- Soyah Classified Forest
- Tafsirla Classified Forest
- Tamba Classified Forest
- Tangama Classified Forest
- Tialakoun Classified Forest
- Tinka Classified Forest
- Tomine Koumba Classified Forest
- Yardo Classified Forest
- Ziama Massif Classified Forest

== Ramsar sites - wetlands of international importance ==
- Bafing-Falémé
- Bafing-Source
- Gambie-Koulountou
- Gambie-Oundou-Liti
- Ile Alcatraz
- Ile Blanche
- Iles Tristao
- Konkouré
- Niger Source
- Niger-Mafou
- Niger-Niandan-Milo
- Niger-Tinkisso
- Rio Kapatchez
- Rio Pongo
- Sankarani-Fié
- Tinkisso
- Mount Nimba
