= Pita Hydroelectric Power Station =

Hydroelectric power station in Guinea

- Map of Guinea showing the location of Pita Hydroelectric Power Station. Pita Hydroelectric Power Station (Africa) Pita Hydroelectric Power Station (Earth)
- Country: Guinea
- Location: Pita, Pita Prefecture, Mamou Region
- Coordinates: 10°53′03″N 12°38′24″W
- Purpose: Power
- Status: Proposed
- Construction cost: US$92.3 million
- Owner: Eiffage

Dam and spillways
- Type of dam: Run of river
- Impounds: Fétoré River (tributary of Kakrima River)

Power Station
- Installed capacity: 40 MW

Pita Hydroelectric Power Station (PHPS) is a planned 40 megawatts (54,000 hp) hydroelectric power station, across the Fétoré River, a tributary of Kakrima River, in Guinea. The power station is under development by Eiffage International, a French civil engineering and construction company, based in Asnières-sur-Seine, a suburb of Paris, about 8 kilometres (5 mi), north of that city's centre.

== Location ==
The power station would be located near the town of Pita, in Pita Prefecture, in the Mamou Region, in south-central Guinea. Pita is located approximately 108 kilometres (67 mi), by road, northwest of the town of Mamou, the provincial capital. This is approximately 313 kilometres (194 mi), by road, northeast of Conakry, the capital and largest city in the country.

== Overview ==
In September 2019, the French civil engineering and construction company Eiffage, presented the feasibility study for this power station to an audience in Conakry, Guinea's capital city. The Fétoré River, across which the dam will be built, is a seasonal river, which will support this power station for six months of the year, during the rainy season. It is now planned to build an associated solar power station to complement the seasonal hydroelectric dam.

== Ownership ==
The Pita Hydroelectric Power Station, is under development and is owned by Eiffage, a French civil engineering and construction company.

== Construction costs and timeline ==
The most recent available cost estimation for his renewable energy project is US$92.3 million. Construction will take approximately six years.

== See also ==
- List of power stations in Guinea
