= Pita, Guinea =

Town in Guinea

Pita
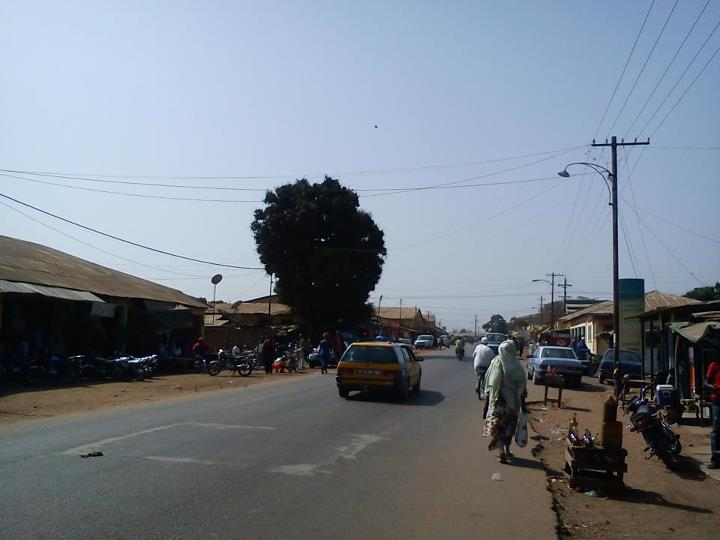

- Location in Guinea
- Coordinates: 11°03′16″N 12°23′46″W
- Country: Guinea
- Region: Mamou Region
- Prefecture: Pita Prefecture
- Elevation: 3,191 ft (972.6 m)

Population (2014 Census)
  - Total: 28,124

Pita (Pular: 𞤅𞤢𞥄𞤪𞤫 𞤆𞤭𞤼𞤢) (Note: Pita is also referred to as "Pita-Centre".) is a town in the Fouta Djallon highlands of Guinea. It is the capital and largest urban center of the Pita Prefecture.

== Location ==
Pita is located in the Pita Prefecture in the Mamou Region, in central Guinea. This is approximately 108 kilometres (67 mi) northwest of the city of Mamou, the regional capital. Pita is located approximately 311 kilometres (193 mi) northeast of the city of Conakry, the country's capital.

The geographical coordinates of the town are 11°03'16.0"N, 12°23'46.0"W (Latitude:11.054444; Longitude:-12.396111). The town is located at an average elevation of 972.6 metres (3,191 ft) above mean sea level.

== Overview ==
The town is known for its bakeries and for waterfalls including the Kinkon Falls and the Kambadaga Falls. Tourists often visit the town market on their journey to and from the mountains and the waterfalls.

== Transport ==
A good national road (N5) leads north to the city of Labé, and then south, through Dalaba to Mamou City.

== Electricity ==
In September 2019, the French civil engineering and construction company Eiffage International, presented the feasibility study for Pita Hydroelectric Power Station. This station, with generation capacity of 40 megawatts, is planned across the Fétoré River, near Pita, Guinea. Due to the seasonality of the river, plans are underway to build an associated solar power station to complement the seasonal hydroelectric dam.

== Population ==
The national census of 31 December 1996 put the population of Pita (Pita-Centre) at 19,489 people. On 1 March 2014, the national census listed the population of Pita at 28,124 inhabitants.

Historical population
| Year | Pop. | ±% |
|---|---|---|
| 1996 | 19,489 | — |
| 2014 | 28,124 | +44.3% |

== Language ==
People in Pita usually speak the Pular language, a Fulani dialect that is spoken by 8.5 million people in Guinea's Fouta Djallon region and by communities in the neighboring countries of Senegal, Sierra Leone and Guinea-Bissau. A small number of Malians also speak Pular.

== See also ==
- Sub-prefectures of Guinea
