= Khoumagueli Solar Power Station =

Solar farm in Guinea

- Country: Guinea
- Location: Linsan, Kindia Region
- Coordinates: 11°46′03″N 12°40′56″W
- Status: Proposed
- Owner: Khoumagueli Solar S.A.

Solar farm
- Type: Flat-panel PV

Power generation
- Nameplate capacity: 40 MW (54,000 hp)

The Khoumagueli Solar Power Station is a 40 MW (54,000 hp) solar power plant under development in Guinea. When completed, it is expected to be the largest grid-connected, privately funded solar power plant in the country.

== Location ==
The power station is located near the town of Linsan in the Kindia Region, in the central-western part of Guinea. Linsan is located about 370 kilometres (230 mi) by road, north of Kindia, the regional capital. Linsan is approximately 472 kilometres (293 mi), by road, northeast of Conakry, the capital and largest city in the county.

== Overview ==
The power station has a 40 megawatt capacity. Its output is intended to be sold directly to Electricité de Guinée (EDG), the state-owned electricity utility company, for integration into the national electricity grid. The 25-year power purchase agreement was signed to that effect in May 2021.

Construction of this renewable energy infrastructure project is intended to meet several objectives. The primary objective is to increase the quantity and reliability of power in the country. Khoumagueli is expected to deliver 40 megawatts of power without any carbon dioxide emission.

Khoumagueli is expected to synchronize its output with the nearby Garafiri Hydroelectric Power Station, with installed capacity of 75 megawatts. During the day, with the sun up, Khoumagueli will be switched on, allowing the turbines of Garafiri to be turned off or turned down. This will allow water to collect behind the dam and be used to power Garafiri at night, when the sun is down and Khoumagueli is not in production. The synchronization will also mitigate power interruptions when Garafiri, which was built about 30 years ago undergoes the necessary servicing and repairs.

== Developers ==
The power station is under development by a consortium of InfraCo Africa, through its contracted developer, Aldwych Africa Developments Limited, Solvéo International Investments SARL and its two subsidiaries, Solvéo Energie S.A.S. and Solvéo Guinea Renewable Energy SA.

The consortium has established a special purpose vehicle company that will own, construct, operate and maintain the power plant. The special purpose company is called Khoumagueli Solar SA. The table below illustrates the shareholding in Khoumagueli Solar SA.

Shareholding In Khoumagueli Solar SA.
Rank	Shareholder	Domicile	Percentage Ownership	Notes
1	InfraCo Africa	United Kingdom	45.0	
2	Solvéo International Investments SARL	Spain		
3	Solvéo Energie S.A.S.	France		
4	Solvéo Guinea Renewable Energy SA.	Guinea		
	Total		100.0	

== See also ==
- List of power stations in Guinea
