= Kankalabé =

- Sub-prefecture and town
- Location in Guinea
- Coordinates: 11°9′N 12°0′W
- Country: Guinea
- Region: Mamou Region
- Prefecture: Dalaba Prefecture

Area
  - Total: 147 sq mi (382 km^{2})
  - Land: 147 sq mi (382 km^{2})

Population (2014)
  - Total: 15,955
  - Density: 108.2/sq mi (41.77/km^{2})
- Time zone: UTC+0 (GMT)

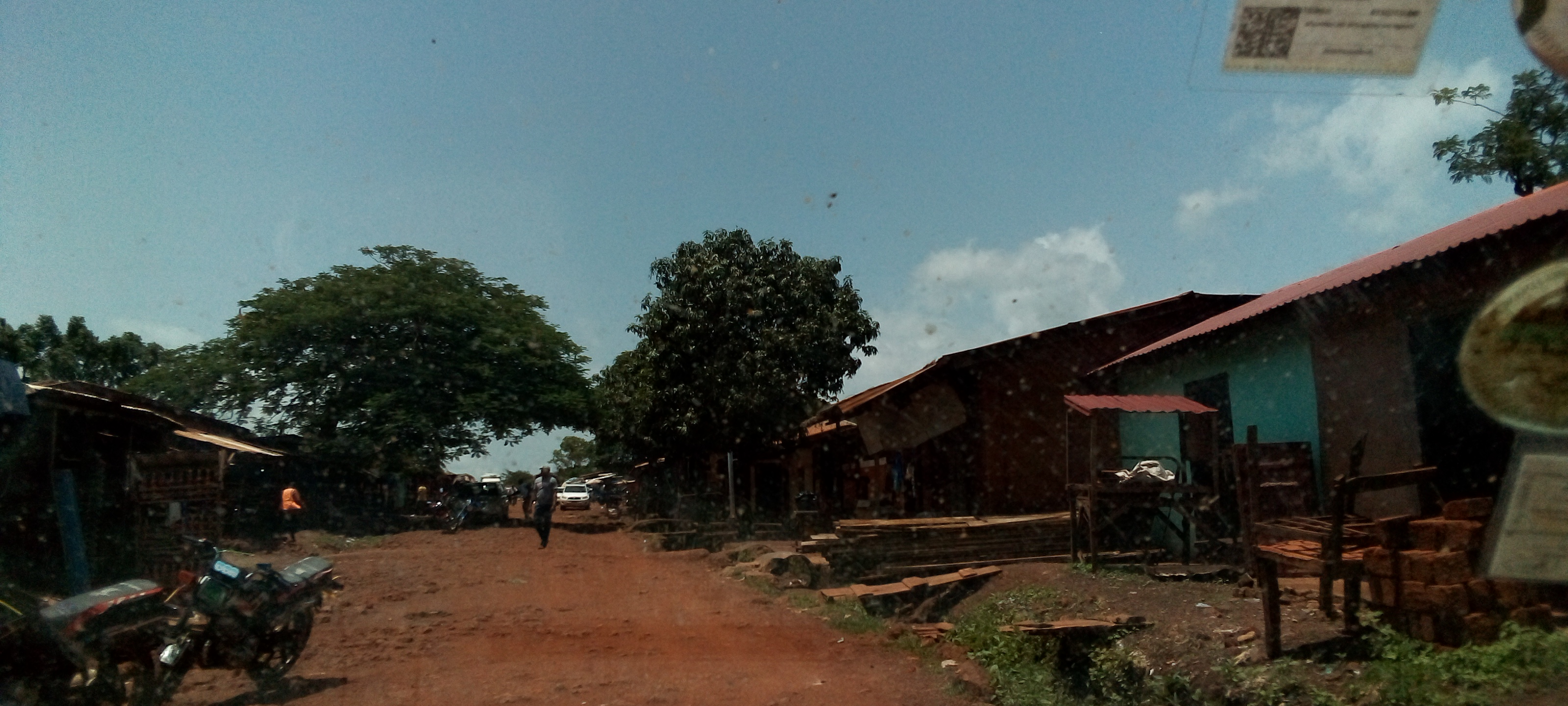
Kankalabé

Kankalabé is a town and sub-prefecture in the Dalaba Prefecture in the Mamou Region of western Guinea.
