= Mitty =

Mitty may refer to:

== People ==
- John Joseph Mitty (1884–1961), American Catholic prelate, Archbishop of San Francisco and Bishop of Salt Lake City
- Joe Mitty, a British salesman and founder of the first Oxfam charity shop in the United Kingdom in 1949
- Milton Mitty Arnold (born 1974), American former tennis player
- Mitty Collier (born 1941), American church pastor, gospel singer and former rhythm and blues singer
- Zafar Masud (1927–2003), Pakistan Air Force air commodore also known as Mitty Masud

== Fictional characters ==
- Walter Mitty, created by James Thurber
- Buck Mitty, known as Humbug (character), a Marvel Comics character
- Mitty, in the manga series Made in Abyss

== Other uses ==
- Mitty, Guinea, a town and sub-prefecture
- Archbishop Mitty High School, a high school in San Jose, California

== See also ==
- Mittie (disambiguation)
