= Garafiri Dam =

Dam in Guinea

- Location within Guinea
- Country: Guinea
- Location: Kindia and Mamou Region
- Coordinates: 10°31′47.18″N 12°39′45.43″W
- Purpose: Power
- Status: Operational
- Construction began: 1995
- Opening date: 1999; 27 years ago
- Owner: Electricite de Guinee

Dam and spillways
- Type of dam: Embankment, earth-fill
- Impounds: Konkouré River
- Height: 80 m (260 ft)
- Spillway type: Chute, uncontrolled

Reservoir
- Total capacity: 1,600×10^{6} m^{3} (1,300,000 acre⋅ft)
- Surface area: 61.7 km^{2} (23.8 sq mi)

Power Station
- Commission date: 1999
- Turbines: 3 x 25 MW (34,000 hp) Francis-type
- Installed capacity: 75 MW (101,000 hp)

The Garafiri Dam is an embankment dam on the Konkouré River which forms the boundary between the Kindia and Mamou Regions of Guinea. The dam was constructed by Salini Impregilo between 1995 and 1999 for the purpose of hydroelectric power generation and water supply. The power station had a breakdown in 2002 but was repaired shortly afterwards. The power station has an installed capacity of 75 megawatts (101,000 hp).

== See also ==
- Energy in Guinea
- List of power stations in Guinea
