= Sonna Seck =

Guinean actress, singer, and comedian (born 1985)

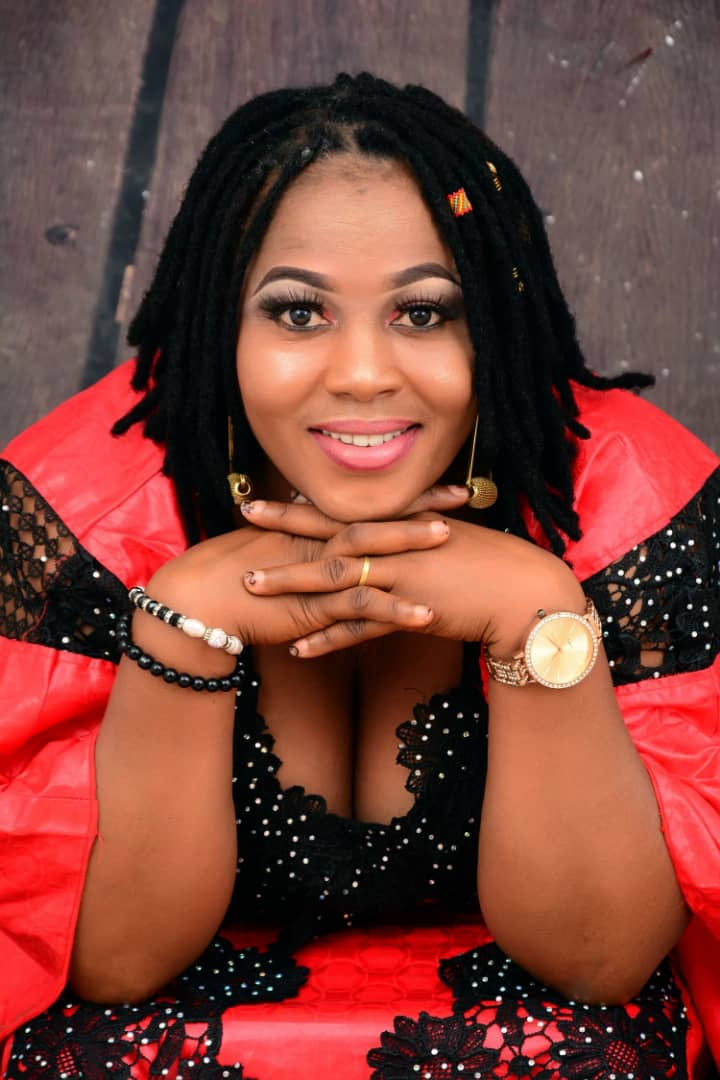
- Seck in 2020
- Born: Maimouna Seck; 1985 (age 40–41); Mamou, Guinea
- Occupations: Actress, singer, comedian
- Years active: 2007-present

Sonna Seck (born Maimouna Seck in 1985) is a Guinean actress, singer, and comedian.

== Biography ==
Seck was born in the crossroads town of Mamou in 1985, into a family of griots. At a young age she began singing the traditional songs at baptisms and wedding ceremonies. Seck attended the Lycee Yimbaya and received her baccalaureate. In 2007, she helped form the Djouri Djaama acting troupe and starred in her first film, Yo-Allah Feounou In, which was successful. Seck starred in a series of films from the Djouri Djaama troupe, the most popular of which were Guigol Naferai Djoki, Mouyide Allah, and Ahh Deboot. The success of these films allowed the group to do several national tours.

In her film, Gourdan-Païkoun, she plays a rapper and performs a song called Saya (La mort). It demonstrated her good voice in addition to her acting skills.

Seck also launched her singing career with the troupe, performing songs such as Bounguai, Sodanelan, and Inmefidjin, often in the pastoral genre. Her most popular song, Tourou Tourou, was released in 2015 and became a hit in Guinea and the surrounding countries. The subject of the song is a man divided between his actual wife and his "co-wife", with a rhythm that encourages dancing. It was mentioned in a speech by President Alpha Condé in March 2018 on the occasion of Women's Day, and the group was able to meet the President. Alongside her troupe mate Mama Ambiance, Seck took the occasion to advocate on behalf of the teachers' union and allow children to return to school In 2020, Seck began her solo career on the label Soudou Daardja Prod. Her first single, Midho Yidhouma, is a love song that pay tribute to her husband living in the United States. It has received over 1 million views on YouTube.
