= Saramoussaya =

- Sub-prefecture and town
- Location in Guinea
- Coordinates: 10°45′N 11°35′W
- Country: Guinea
- Region: Mamou Region
- Prefecture: Mamou Prefecture
- Time zone: UTC+0 (GMT)

Saramoussaya is a town and sub-prefecture in the Mamou Prefecture in the Mamou Region of Guinea. As of 2014, the sub-prefecture has a population of 23,216, up from 14,326 in 1996.
