= Pinselly Classified Forest =

Coordinates: 10.170°N 11.748°W

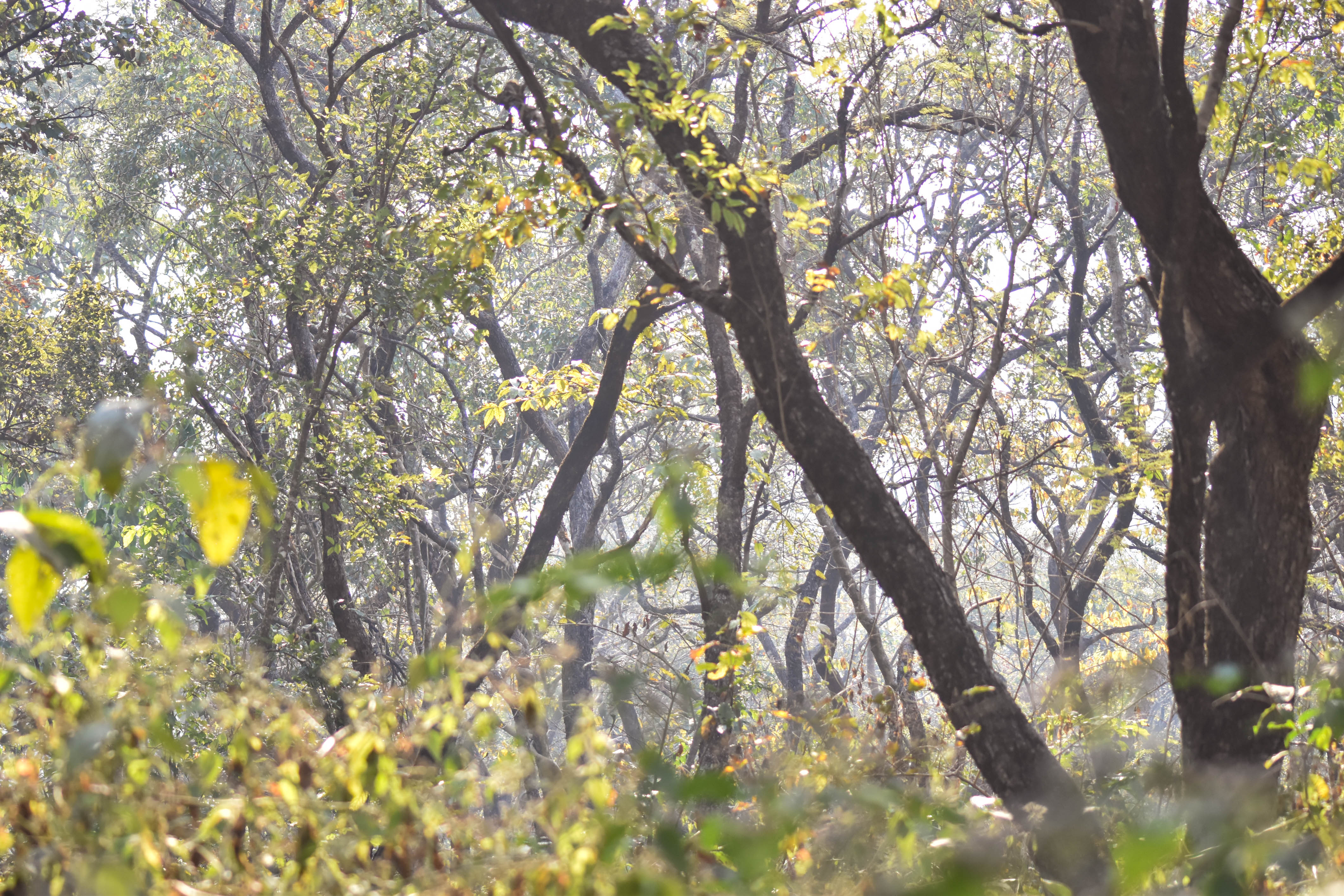

- Pinselly Classified Forest (Guinea)
- Location: Mamou Prefecture, Guinea
- Nearest city: Ouré-Kaba
- Area: 13,000 ha (32,000 acres)

Pinselly Classified Forest is situated in Mamou Prefecture, south-eastern part of Fouta Djallon Highlands in Guinea. The closest city is Ouré-Kaba. The protected area is characterized by dry montane forests, tall-grassed savanna patches, and dense evergreen vegetation with giant trees in the moist valleys. It is a home for forest elephants, hippopotamuses, and a large diversity of primates and ungulates. Reported species are among others Diana monkey, patas monkey, olive baboon, Western bongo, bushbuck, and red-flanked duiker. In fact, there is a high density of the endangered Western chimpanzee, and this area is a stronghold for the species, together with the nearby Soya Classified Forest. Pinselly Classified forest has a good potential in wildlife tourism, due to its relative proximity to Conakry (300 km). The forest can be reached within 7 hours from the capital by city car.

== Gallery ==
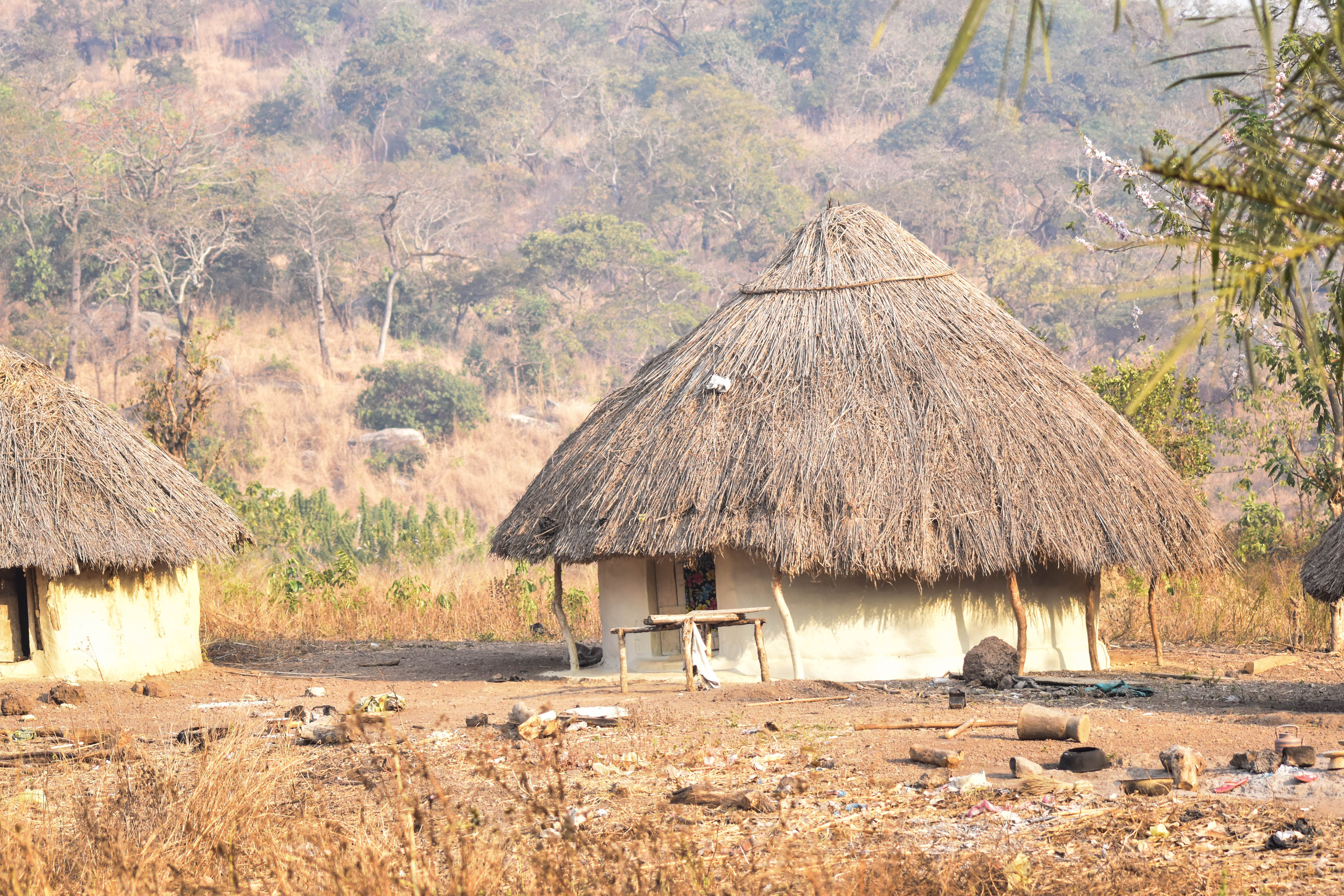
A traditional tribal house at the border of the protected forest

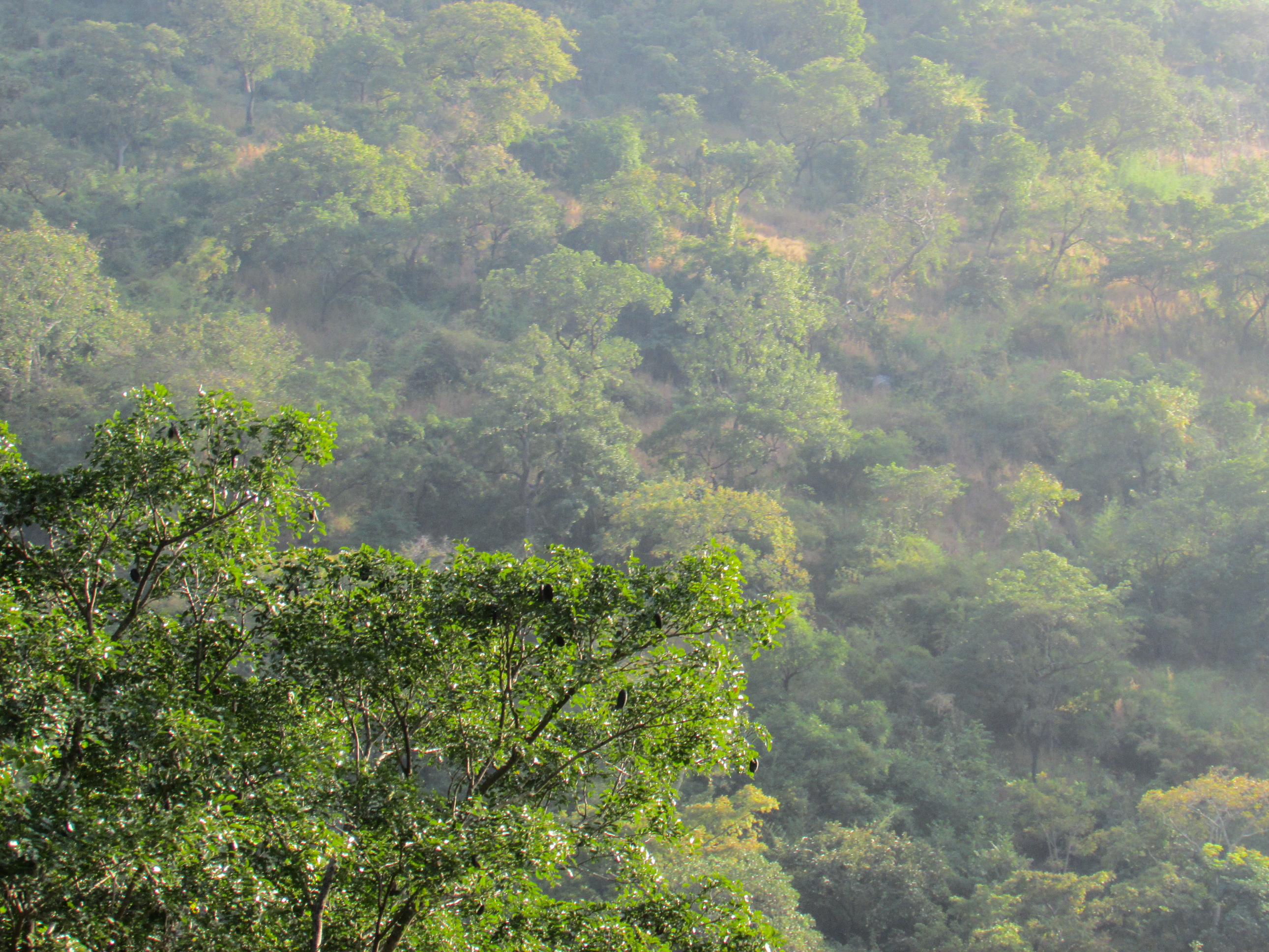
The characteristic mountainous landscape

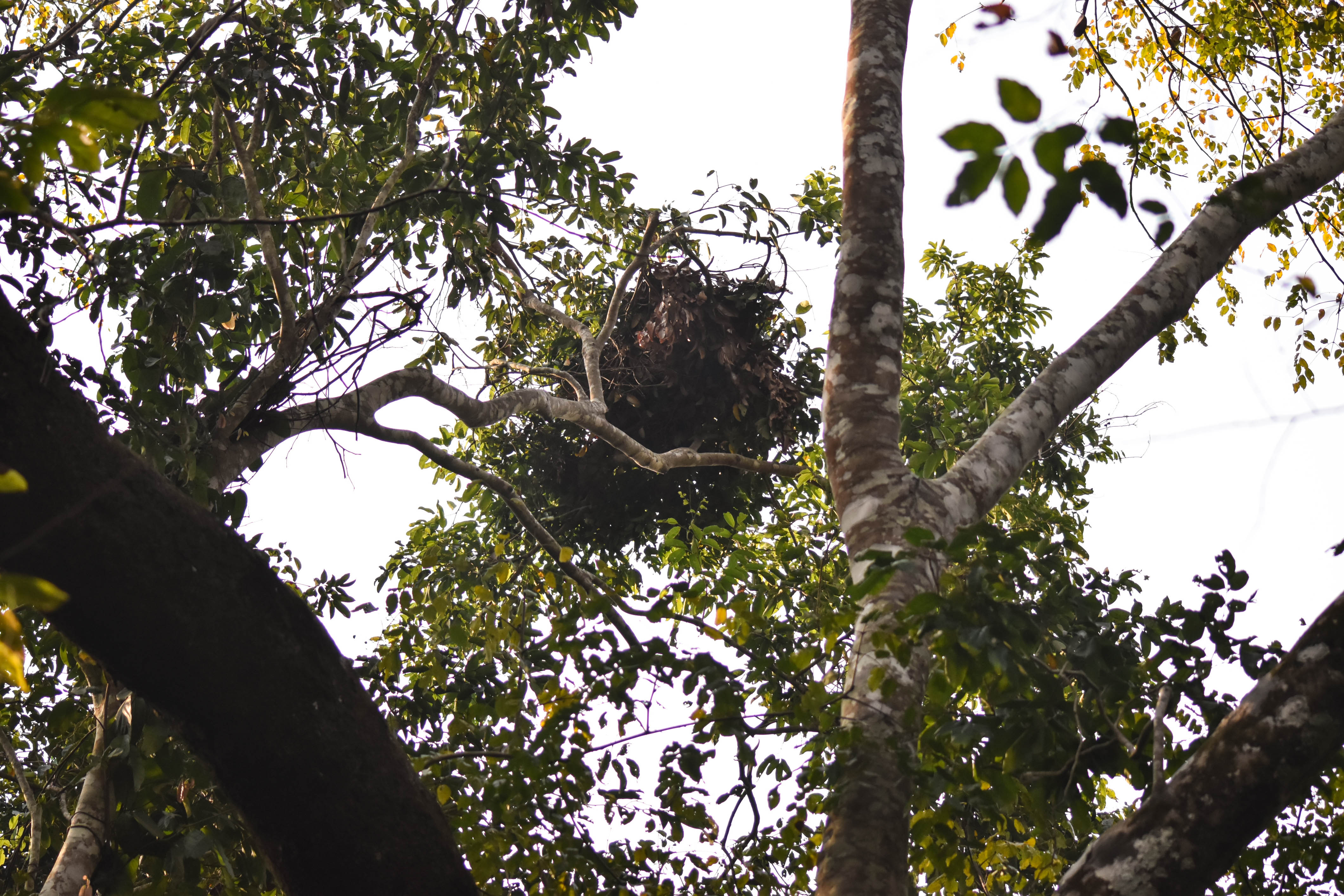
A chimpanzee sleeping nest

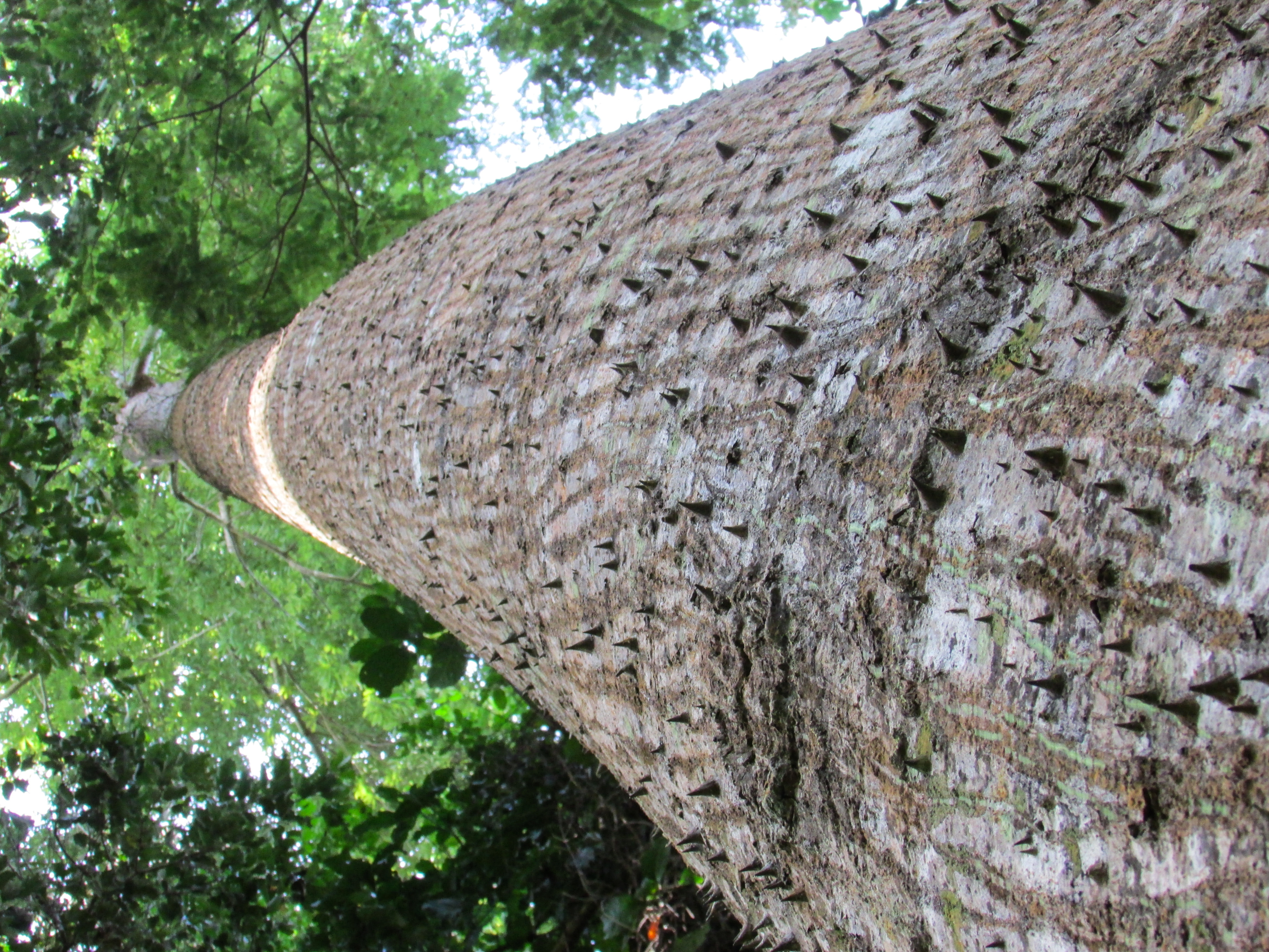
A giant rainforest tree

== See also ==
- Guinea
- Wildlife of Guinea
- Fouta Djallon
- Mamou Prefecture
- Ouré-Kaba
