= Koukoutamba Hydroelectric Power Station =

Hydroelectric power station in Guinea

- Map of Guinea showing the location of Koukoutamba Hydroelectric Power Station Koukoutamba Hydroelectric Power Station (Africa) Koukoutamba Hydroelectric Power Station (Earth)
- Country: Guinea
- Coordinates: 11°16′06″N 11°20′45″W
- Purpose: Power
- Status: Proposed
- Construction cost: US$ 812 million
- Owner: Organisation pour la mise en valeur du fleuve Sénégal
- Operator: OMVS

Dam and spillways
- Type of dam: Run of river
- Impounds: Bafing River

Power Station
- Installed capacity: 294 megawatts (394,000 hp)
- Annual generation: 888 GWh

Koukoutamba Hydroelectric Power Station is a planned 294-megawatt (394,000 hp) hydroelectric power station, across the Bafing River, a tributary of the Senegal River, in Guinea. The power station is under development by the Organisation pour la mise en valeur du fleuve Sénégal (OMVS; English: Senegal River Basin Development Authority). OMVS will sell the electricity to the four member electricity utility companies of the organization. Sinohydro, a hydropower engineering and construction company, owned by the Chinese state, was awarded the engineering, procurement and construction (EPC) contract. The US$812 million project is funded by the Exim Bank of China.

== Location ==
The power station would be located in the community of Koukoutamba, in Tougué Prefecture, in the Labé Region of Guinea. Koukoutamba is located approximately 60 kilometres (37 mi) by road, southeast of Tougué the capital of the prefecture. This is about 152 kilometres (94 mi) by road, east of the city of Labé, the regional capital. Koukoutamba is approximately 456 kilometres (283 mi), by road, northeast of the city of Conakry, the country's capital.

== Overview ==
The proposed Koukoutamba Dam will serve multiple purposes. In addition to generating 294 megawatts in clean renewable energy, it will create a reservoir capable of storing of 36,000,000,000 cubic metres (1.271328001974×10^{12} cu ft) of water. The water stored here will help create benefits in the areas of drinking water, agriculture, livestock farming, fishing and water transport.

The power generated here will be shared equally among the four electricity utility companies of the member states of the OMVS, the entity that is developing and owns the dam and power station.

== Ownership ==
The table below illustrates the member electricity utility companies of the Organisation pour la mise en valeur du fleuve Sénégal (OMVS), the Senegal River Basin Development Authority, which owns and is developing the Koukoutamba Hydroelectric Power Station.

Member electricity utility companies in OMVS
Rank	Utility	Domicile	Share in Koukoutamba HPP	Notes
1	National Electricity Corporation of Senegal (Senelec)	Senegal	73.5 MW	
2	Electricité de Guinée (EDG)	Guinea	73.5 MW	
3	Mauritanian Electricity Corporation (Somelec)	Mauritania	73.5 MW	
4	Energie du Mali (EDM)	Mali	73.5 MW	

== Construction costs and funding ==
The engineering, procurement and construction (EPC) contract for this project was awarded to Sinohydro, the Chinese, state-owned hydropower engineering and construction company. The construction budget has been reported as US$812 million.

The construction funds will be borrowed from the Exim Bank of China. Once started, construction is expected to take four years.

== See also ==
- List of power stations in Guinea
- Kaleta Hydropower Plant
