= Bantignel =

- Sub-prefecture and town
- Location in Guinea
- Coordinates: 11°07′N 12°18′W
- Country: Guinea
- Region: Mamou Region
- Prefecture: Pita Prefecture
- Time zone: UTC+0 (GMT)

Bantignel is a town and sub-prefecture in the Pita Prefecture in the Mamou Region of northern-central Guinea.
