= Nyagara =

- Sub-prefecture and town
- Location in Guinea
- Coordinates: 10°45′N 11°48′W
- Country: Guinea
- Region: Mamou Region
- Prefecture: Mamou Prefecture
- Time zone: UTC+0 (GMT)

Nyagara is a town and sub-prefecture in the Mamou Prefecture in the Mamou Region of Guinea.
