= Alfa Ntiallo =

Guinean basketball player (born 1992)

Alfa Ntiallo Άλφα Ντιάλο
No. 14 – Pagrati
- Position: Center
- League: Greek A2 Basket League

Personal information
- Born: 13 October 1992 (age 34) Mitty, Guinea
- Listed height: 6 ft 10.75 in (2.10 m)
- Listed weight: 250 lb (113 kg)

Career information
- Playing career: 2012–present

Career history
- 2012: Panerythraikos
- 2012–2013: Irakleio
- 2013–2014: Filathlitikos
- 2014–2015: Pagrati
- 2015: Xuventude
- 2017: Kavala
- 2017–2019: Psychiko
- 2019–present: Pagrati

Alfa Agkimpou Ntiallo Fasengas (alternate spellings: Alpha, Diallo, Dialo, Ntialo) (Greek: Άλφα Αγκιμπού Ντιάλο Φασένγας; born 13 October 1992), is a Guinean professional basketball player for Pagrati and Guinea.

== Early life ==
Ntiallo was born in Mitty, Guinea. He moved to Larissa, Greece, in 2009, at the age of 16.

== Professional career ==
After playing with the youth clubs of Olimpia Larissa, Panathinaikos, and Ikaros, Ntiallo began his professional career in the Greek 2nd Division with Panerythraikos in 2012. He then moved to the Greek 2nd Division club Irakleio. He moved to Filathlitikos in 2013.

He joined Pagrati in 2014, and then in 2015, he moved to Xuventude to play in the Spanish 3rd Division.

== National team career ==
Ntiallo was a member of the Greek junior national teams. With Greece's junior national team, he played at the 2010 FIBA Europe Under-18 Championship.

Later, he joined the Guinea national basketball team and played with the squad at AfroBasket 2017.
