= Tolo, Guinea =

- Sub-prefecture and town
- Location in Guinea
- Coordinates: 10°23′N 11°45′W
- Country: Guinea
- Region: Mamou Region
- Prefecture: Mamou Prefecture
- Time zone: UTC+0 (GMT)

Tolo, Guinea is a town and sub-prefecture in the Mamou Prefecture in the Mamou Region of Guinea.

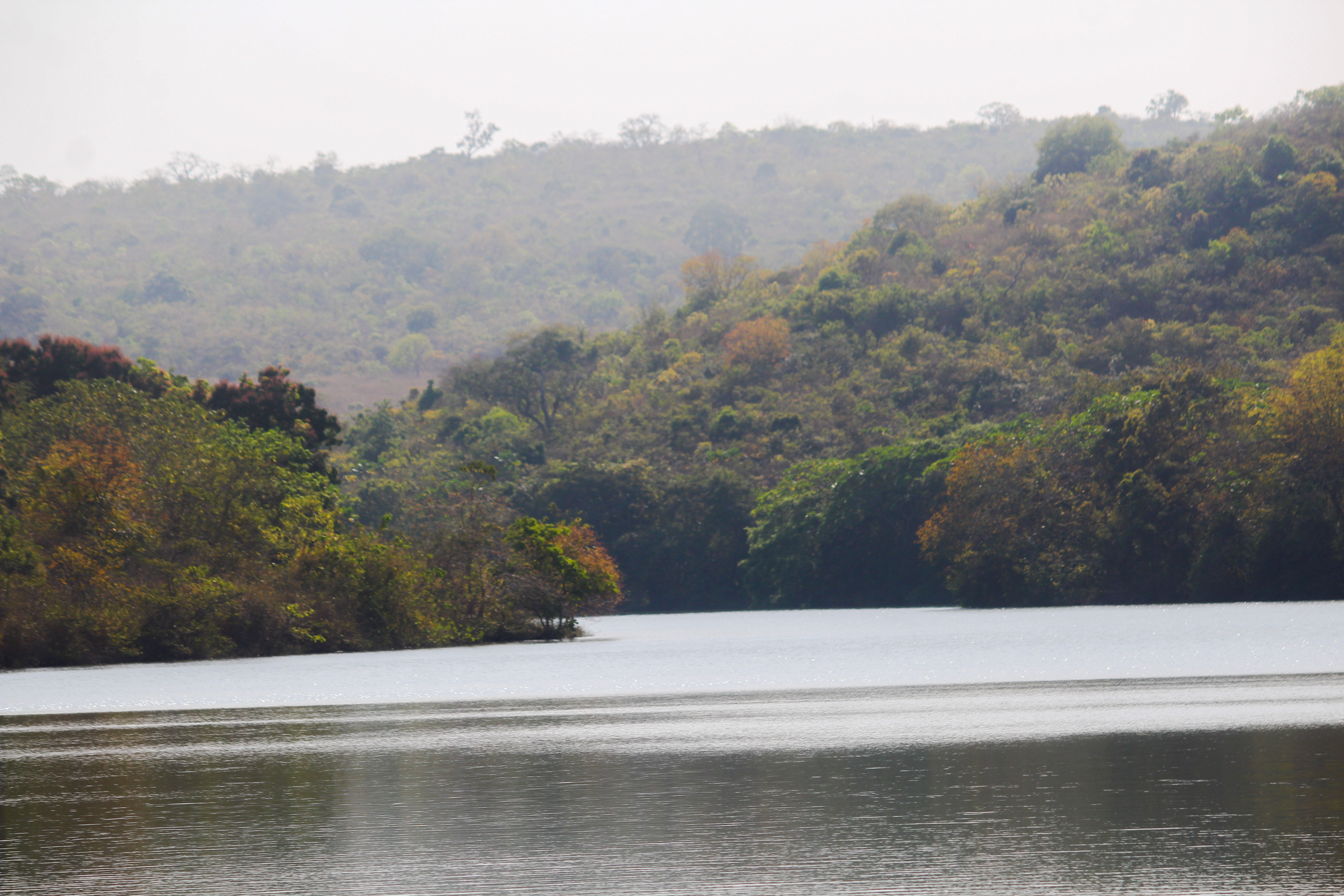
Bafing source
