= Bouliwel =

- Sub-prefecture and town
- Location in Guinea
- Coordinates: 10°37′N 12°11′W
- Country: Guinea
- Region: Mamou Region
- Prefecture: Mamou Prefecture
- Time zone: UTC+0 (GMT)

Bouliwel is a town and sub-prefecture in the Mamou Prefecture in the Mamou Region of Guinea.

The sub-prefecture of Bouliwel is subdivided in the following districts:

Districts	Places
Bhawo Fello	26
Boulliwel Centre	23
Bounanya	20
Dianya	11
Dounki	26
Kelliwol	33
Kendouma	48
Lapouwol	13
Loopi	25
Sennadé	26
Soriya	23
274
