= Téguéréya =

- Sub-prefecture and town
- Nickname: Esther
- Location in Guinea
- Coordinates: 10.6114°N 12.1869°W
- Country: Guinea
- Region: Mamou Region
- Prefecture: Mamou Prefecture
- Time zone: UTC+0 (GMT)

Téguéréya is a town and sub-prefecture in the Mamou Prefecture in the Mamou Region of Guinea.
