= Timbi-Madina =

- Sub-prefecture and town
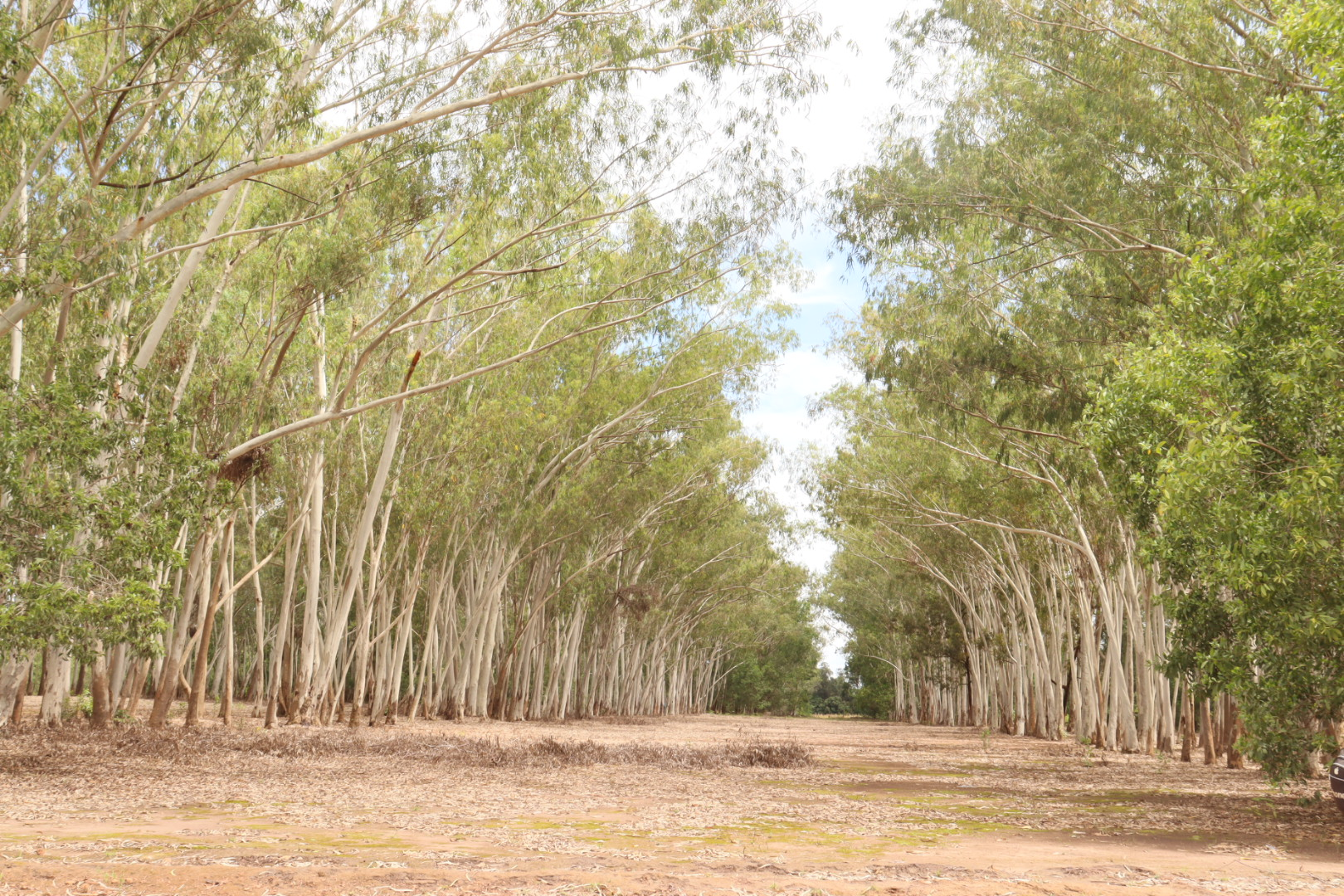

- Location in Guinea
- Coordinates: 11°12′00″N 12°32′00″W
- Country: Guinea
- Region: Mamou Region
- Prefecture: Pita Prefecture
- Time zone: UTC+0 (GMT)

Timbi-Madina is a town and sub-prefecture in the Pita Prefecture in the Mamou Region of northern-central Guinea.
