= Touma =

Touma may refer to:

== Surname ==
- Aida Touma-Suleiman, (born 1964), Israeli Arab journalist and politician
- Ami Touma, (born 2006), Japanese actress
- Carlos Abumohor Touma, Chilean businessman and investor
- Emile Touma, political historian and philosopher and thinker
- Habib Hassan Touma, (1934–1998), Palestinian composer and ethnomusicologist
- Sharbel Touma, Lebanese-born Swedish footballer
- Travis Touma, Lebanese international rugby league footballer
- Yumi Touma, Japanese singer and voice actor
- Ziad Touma, Lebanese Canadian film director

== Fictional characters ==
- Touma Amagase, from the game The Idolmaster 2 and The Idolmaster SideM
- Touma H. Norstein, from the anime series Digimon Data Squad
- Touma Kamijou, from the anime series To Aru Majutsu no Index
- Touma Kamiyama, from the tokusatsu series Kamen Rider Saber
- Touma Yoimachi, from the tokusatsu series Kaitou Sentai Lupinranger VS Keisatsu Sentai Patranger

== Places ==
- Bab Touma, a borough of Old Damascus in Syria
- Dongol-Touma, a town and subprefecture in Guinea
