= Bodié =

- Sub-prefecture and town
- Location in Guinea
- Coordinates: 11°2′N 12°4′W
- Country: Guinea
- Region: Mamou Region
- Prefecture: Dalaba Prefecture
- Time zone: UTC+0 (GMT)

Bodié is a town and sub-prefecture in the Dalaba Prefecture in the Mamou Region of western Guinea.
