= Sangaréah =

- Sub-prefecture and town
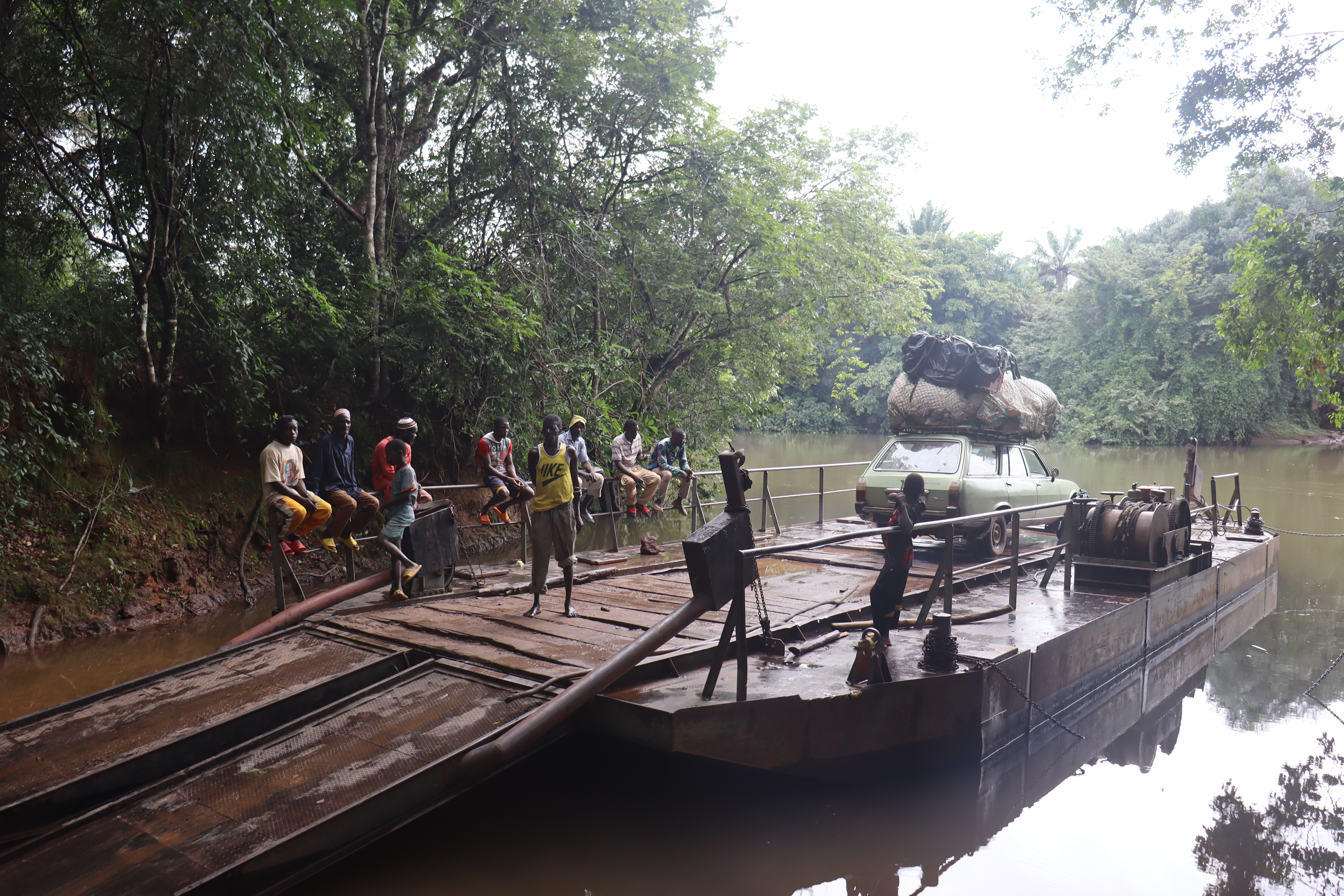
- Cross uncertain

- Location in Guinea
- Coordinates: 10°38′N 12°51′W
- Country: Guinea
- Region: Mamou Region
- Prefecture: Pita Prefecture
- Time zone: UTC+0 (GMT)

Sangaréah is a town and sub-prefecture in the Pita Prefecture in the Mamou Region of northern-central Guinea.
