= Vehicle registration plates of Guinea =

Republic of Guinea
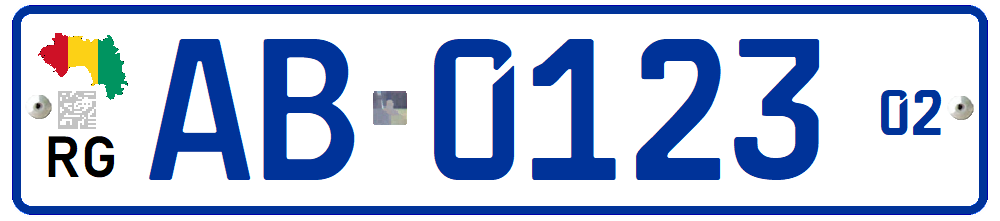
- Guinean regular legal standard number plate, 02 standing for Conakry.
- Country: Guinea
- Country code: RG

Current series
- Size: 520 mm × 110 mm 20.5 in × 4.3 in
- Serial format: AB-0123
- Colour (front): Blue on white
- Colour (rear): Blue on white

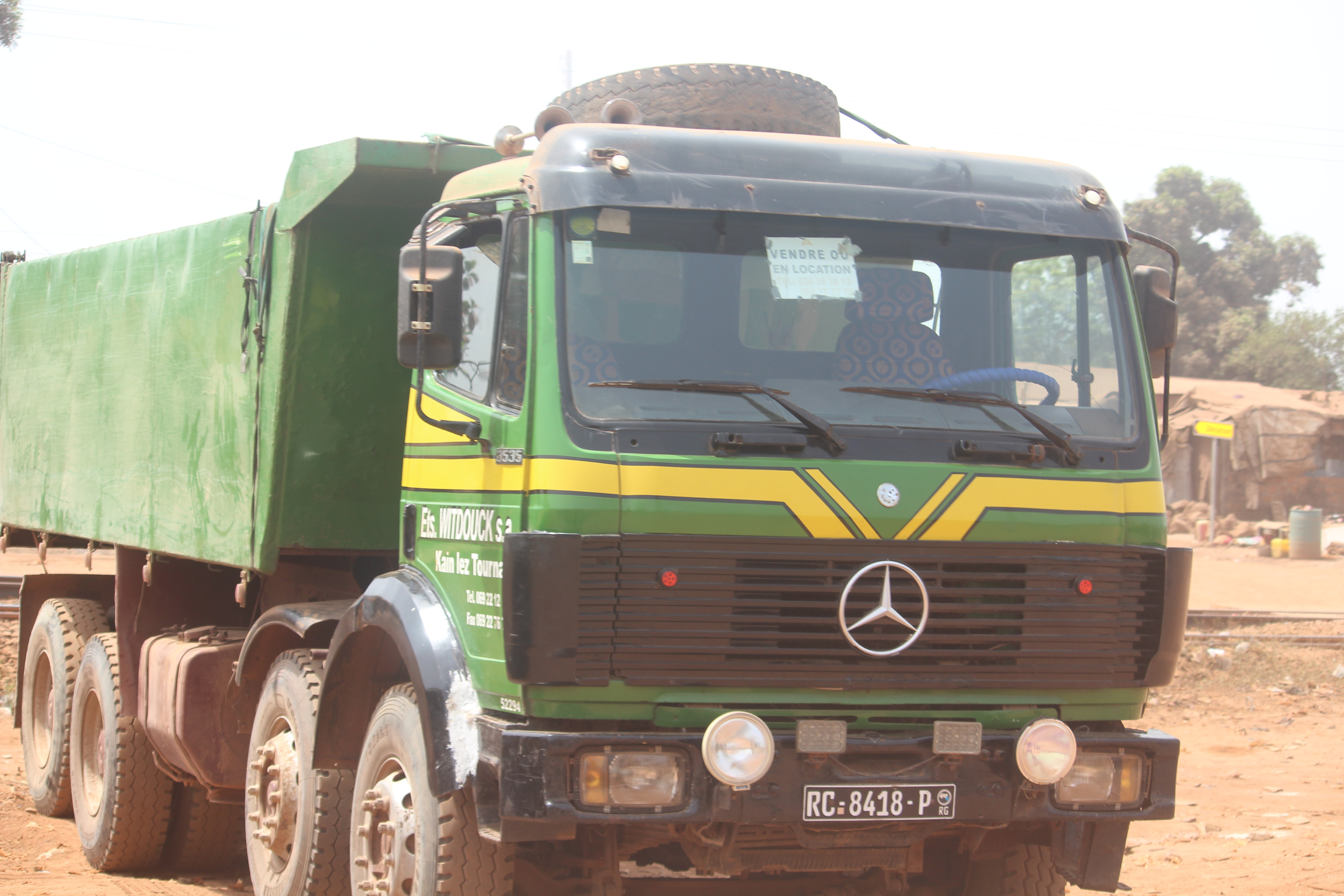
Truck License Plate

The Republic of Guinea (also referred to as Guinea-Conakry) requires its residents to register their motor vehicles and display vehicle registration plates.

Dates issued	Vehicle Type	Image	Design	Serial format	Notes
1994-2021	Passenger Vehicles		52 cm x 11 cm White on red On the right hand side flag-map Guinea in a black colored circle and country-code RG.	XX-123-AB	XX indicates the two-letter regional code. RC indicates Conakry Region for example.
1994-2021	Passenger Vehicles		30 cm x 15 cm White on red On the top right corner, flag-map Guinea in a black colored circle and country-code RG.	XX-123-AB	XX indicates the two-letter regional code. RC indicates Conakry Region for example.
1994-2021	Taxis, Trucks		52 cm x 11 cm White on black On the right hand side flag-map Guinea in a black colored circle and country-code RG.	XX-123-A	XX indicates the two-letter regional code. RC indicates Conakry Region for example.
1994-2021	Taxis, Trucks		30 cm x 15 cm White on black On the top right corner, flag-map Guinea in a black colored circle and country-code RG.	XX-123-A	XX indicates the two-letter regional code. RC indicates Conakry Region for example.
2021-Present	Passenger Vehicles, Trucks, Buses		52 cm x 11 cm Blue on White; On the left hand side flag-map Guinea, a QR Code and the country-code RG.	AB-123 [##]	## indicates the two-letter regional code. 02 indicates Conakry Region for example.
2021-Present	Passenger Vehicles, Trucks, Buses		30 cm x 15 cm Blue on White; On the left hand side flag-map Guinea, a QR Code and the country-code RG.	AB-123 [##]	## indicates the two-letter regional code. 02 indicates Conakry Region for example.
2021-Present	Motorcycles		24 cm x 13 cm Blue on White; On the top left hand corner flag-map Guinea, a QR Code and the country-code RG.	AB 012 A [##]	## indicates the two-letter regional code. 02 indicates Conakry Region for example.

== Regional Codes ==
Region	Code 1994-2021	Code 2021-Present
Conakry	RC	02
Boké		01
Faranah		03
Kankan		04
Kindia		05
Labé		06
Mamou		07
Nzérékoré		08
