= Banieya Dam =

Dam in Kindia, Guinea

- Location within Guinea
- Country: Guinea
- Location: Kindia Region
- Coordinates: 10°00′23.73″N 12°59′46.83″W
- Purpose: Power, water supply
- Status: Operational
- Opening date: 1969; 57 years ago
- Owner: Electricite de Guinee

Dam and spillways
- Type of dam: Embankment, earth-fill
- Impounds: Samou River
- Height: 30 m (98 ft)
- Spillway type: Chute, controlled

Reservoir
- Total capacity: 223,000,000 m^{3} (181,000 acre⋅ft)
- Surface area: 28 km^{2} (11 sq mi)

Power Station
- Commission date: 1988
- Turbines: 2 x 2.6 MW (3,500 hp) Kaplan-type
- Installed capacity: 5.2 MW (7,000 hp)

The Banieya Dam is an embankment dam on the Samou River in the Kindia Region of Guinea. It is located 16 km (9.9 mi) west of Kindia. The dam was completed by 1969 for the purpose of water supply. A hydroelectric power station of 5.2 megawatts (7,000 hp) was commissioned at the dam's toe in 1988. The Kale Dam, which also supports a hydroelectric power station, is located downstream.

== See also ==
- Energy in Guinea
- List of power stations in Guinea
