= Kégnéko =

- Sub-prefecture and town
- Location in Guinea
- Coordinates: 10°32′26″N 11°46′46″W
- Country: Guinea
- Region: Mamou Region
- Prefecture: Mamou Prefecture
- Time zone: UTC+0 (GMT)

Kégnéko is a town and sub-prefecture in the Mamou Prefecture in the Mamou Region of Guinea. It lies on the southern side of the river of the same name.
