= Mittie =

Mittie may refer to:

- Mittie Maude Lena Gordon (1889–1961), American black nationalist
- Mittie Lawrence (born 1941), American actress and model
- Mittie Point (1850–1937), pen name Mrs. Alex. McVeigh Miller, American novelist
- Mary Taylor Brush (1866–1949), American aviator, artist, plane designer and camouflage pioneer nicknamed "Mittie"
- Martha Bulloch Roosevelt (1835–1884), American socialite nicknamed "Mittie", mother of Theodore Roosevelt
- Jeff Mittie (born 1966), American college women's basketball head coach
- Mittie, Louisiana, United States, an unincorporated community

== See also ==
- Mitty (disambiguation)
