= Kaleta Hydropower Plant =

Dam in the Konkoure River Basin, Guinea

Kaleta Hydropower Plant 凯乐塔水电站
- Location in Guinea
- Interactive map of Kaleta Hydropower Plant 凯乐塔水电站
- Country: Republic of Guinea
- Location: in the Konkoure River Basin in Western Guinea
- Coordinates: 10.4634°N 13.2819°W
- Purpose: Power
- Construction began: 18 April 2012
- Construction cost: $527 million (an estimated cost)

The Kaleta Hydropower Plant (Chinese: 凯乐塔水电站), also known as Kaleta Hydropower Project or Kaléta Hydropower Station, is a water conservancy project in the Republic of Guinea, located in the Konkoure River Basin in Western Guinea, with a total installed capacity of 240 MW. This project was constructed by China International Water & Electric Corporation.

The construction of the project officially started on 18 April 2012, with an estimated cost of $527 million. On May 28, 2015, the first unit of the hydropower station was officially connected to the grid for power generation. On September 28, 2015, local time in Guinea, the plant was completed and inaugurated in a celebration ceremony.

Before the Souapiti Hydropower Station is scheduled to be completed and put into operation in 2021, the Kaleta Hydropower Plant is the largest hydropower station in Guinea.

== See also ==
- Koukoutamba Hydroelectric Power Station
