= Konkouré River =

River in Guinea

Coordinates: 9.8306°N 13.7958°W

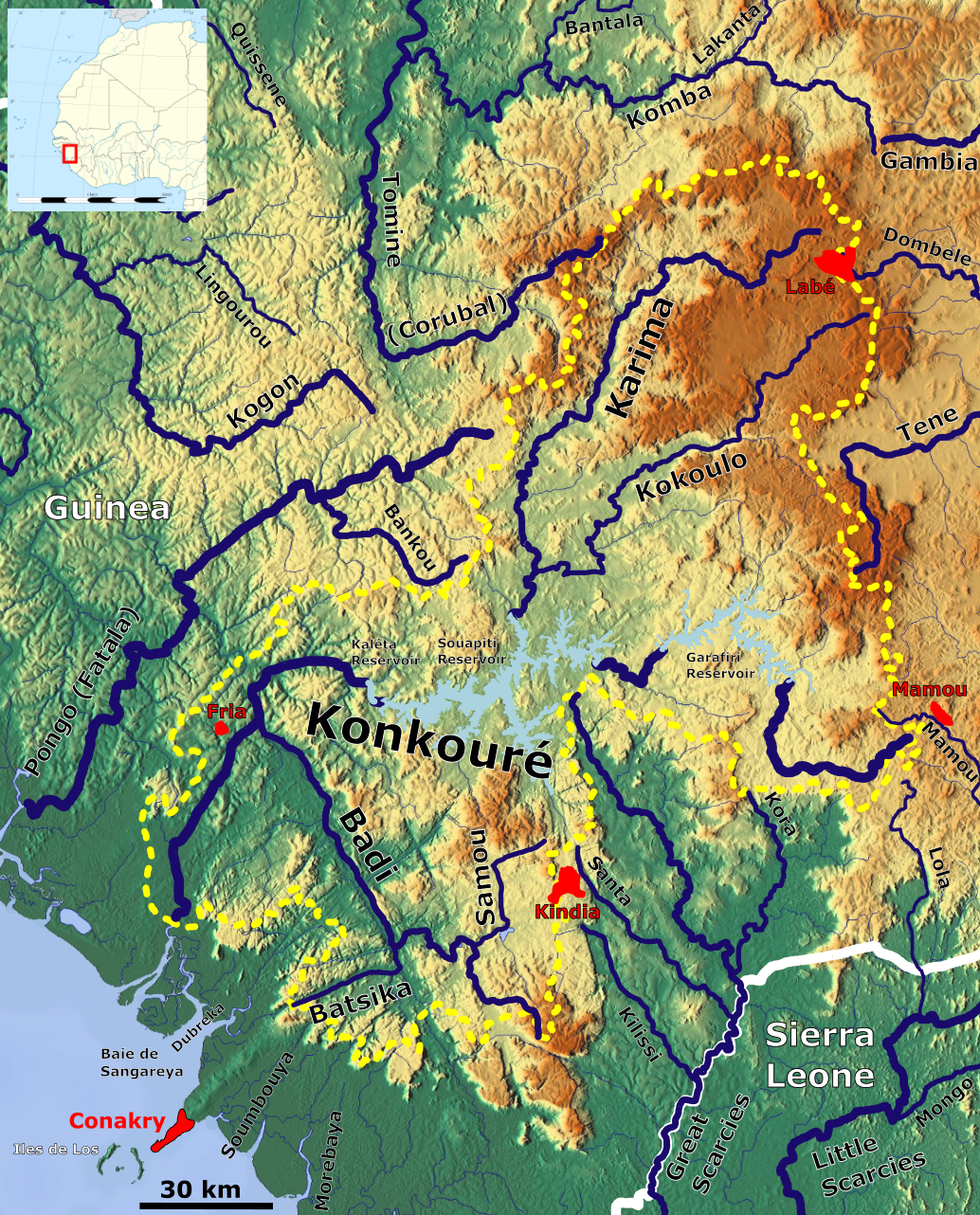
Konkouré Basin

The Konkouré River arises in west-central Guinea and flows into the Atlantic Ocean. Several dams on the river provide the country with much of its electricity.

== Geography ==
The river originates in the Futa Jallon highland region and flows in a westerly direction 303 km (188 mi) to the Atlantic Ocean north of the Baie de Sangareya (Sangareya Bay) at 9°46'N, 14°19'W. The Kakrima River is its major tributary. The river delta covers 320 km^{2} (120 sq mi). Vessels of up to 3 m (9.8 ft) draft can navigate upstream to Konkouré; beyond that point, there are rapids.

== Environment ==
The upper river flows over a rocky substrate with many rapids and waterfalls, making it unsuitable for navigation, though it does make it suitable for electricity production. The lower river is a shallow, funnel-shaped, mesotidal, mangrove-fringed, tide-dominated estuary. Rice farms have been established in the mangrove areas of the delta "with some success".

=== Wildlife ===
The river is home to 96 recorded freshwater fish species.

The estuary, along with part of Sangareya Bay and the mouths of the Konkouré and Bouramaya rivers, has been designated an Important Bird Area (IBA) by BirdLife International because it supports significant populations of western reef egrets, pied avocets and common redshanks. It encompasses 28,000 ha of mangroves, mudflats, sandbanks and rice-fields. African manatees occur in the mangroves and common bottlenose dolphins in the bay.

== Dams ==
In 1999, the Garafiri Dam was opened at a cost of $221 million; it can produce 75 megawatts (101,000 hp) of electricity. Construction of a 240-megawatt (320,000 hp) hydroelectric dam on the river near Kaleta, the Kaleta Hydropower Plant, was completed in June 2015 and commissioned on 28 September at a cost of $526 million; the 1,545-metre-long (5,069 ft) dam lies about 120 kilometres (75 mi) or 85 miles (137 km) north of the capital city of Conakry.

In 2015, the central government contracted with Chinese firms to begin building a 550-megawatt (740,000 hp) dam (the Souapiti Hydropower Station), near Souapiti, about 2 kilometres (1.2 mi) further upstream, which would almost double Guinea's power generation output at an estimated cost of $2 billion. This would, however, require that 15,000 people move out of what would become a flood plain.
