= List of power stations in Guinea =

This page lists the main power stations in Guinea contributing to the public power supply.

There are also a number of private power plants supplying specific industrial users such as mines and refineries.

Guinea is considered to have considerable renewable energy potential. Schemes at an advanced state of development are included.

Country Priority Plan and Diagnostic of the Electricity Sector, published in November 2021 by the African Development Bank [AfDB], heavily informs this article.

== Hydroelectric ==
Hydroelectric station	Community	Coordinates	Type	Name of reservoir	River	Capacity (MW)	Status / year completed	Notes
Fomi					Niger	90		Completion 2026
Amaria					Konkoure	300	Under Construction	Completion 2025
Sambangalou					Gambia	128	Contracted	Power station and dam will be in Senegal, lake 80% in Guinea
Koukoutamba					Bafing	294	Contracted	
Morisanako					Sankarani	100	Proposed	
Kogbedou-Frankonedou					Milo	90	Proposed	
Boureya					Bafing	160	Proposed	
Tiopo						105	Proposed	
Garafiri	Garafiri	10.5297°N 12.6625°W	Reservoir		Konkoure	75	1999	
Banieya or Baneah		10.0065°N 12.9961°W	Reservoir		Samou	5	1988	Dam completed 1969, power station added later.
Donkèa		9.9556°N 13.0068°W	Reservoir		Samou	15		Donkea is the power station fed by Kale dam.
Grand Chutes		9.9247°N 13.1007°W	Reservoir		Samou	26	1953, 1969 upgrade, 1983 upgrade	
Kinkon		11.0483°N 12.4504°W			Koulou	3.5		
Tinkisso		10.7281°N 11.1684°W			Tinkisso	1.65		
Kaleta	Kaleta	10.4641°N 13.2810°W	Reservoir		Konkoure	240	2015	
Souapiti		10.4241°N 13.2545°W	Reservoir		Konkoure	550	2020	
Boke Dam	Boké		Reservoir		Cogon River	130	2016 (Expected)	status uncertain

== Solar ==
A solar facility is proposed at Khoumagueli with 40MW of capacity.

== Thermal ==
Thermal power station	Community	Coordinates	Fuel type	Capacity (MW)	Year completed	Name of Owner	Notes
Kaloum 5	Tombo, Conkary	9.5197°N 13.6974°W		32.5	2005		
Kaloum 1	Tombo, Conakry	9.5197°N 13.6974°W	Diesel fuel	24	1997	GNE	
Kaloum 2	Tombo, Conakry	9.5197°N 13.6974°W	Diesel fuel	26	1997	GNE	
Kipe		9.6024°N 13.6366°W		50			
Karpowership				115			Short term contract to supply power Power is from a vessel not a permanent station
Tè-Power	Conakry	9.6020°N 13.6037°W	Heavy Fuel Oil	50	circa 2019		Short term contract to supply power
Kaloum 3	Conakry	9.5197°N 13.6974°W	Diesel fuel	44	1999	GNE	Short term contract to supply power
Kankan				18			
Nzérékoré				5.9			
Faranah				1.4			
Boké				12.6			
Aggreko Thermal Power Station	Conakry		Diesel fuel	50	2013	Aggreko	status uncertain, possible duplication

== Sea waves ==
Solar power station	Community	Coordinates	Capacity (MW)	Year completed	Name of Owner	Notes
Guinea Sea Wave Power Station			100		SDE Energy of Israel	In development

== See also ==
- List of power stations in Africa
- List of largest power stations in the world
- Energy in Guinea
