= Fatoumata Barry =

Guinean architect

- Born: 1954 (age 71–72); Mamou, Guinea
- Citizenship: Guinea
- Education: University of Conakry
- Occupation: Architect
- Known for: Guinea's first woman architect
- Honours: President of the Order of Architects of Guinea

Fatoumata Barry (born 1954) is an architect and writer from Guinea. She is known as Guinea's first woman architect, and is a former President of the Order of Architects of Guinea.

== Biography ==
Born in 1954 in Mamou in Middle Guinea, Barry's father was a doctor and politician. She obtained her baccalaureate in 1973 from the Lycée 2 août in Donka, and subsequently studied Civil Engineering at the University of Conakry, before taking up a scholarship from Cuban President Fidel Castro to study architecture in Havana for 5 years. On her return to Guinea she worked as an architect. In 2002 she established her own practice called Archi plus. Known as Guinea's first woman architect, Barry was President of the Order of Architects of Guinea from 2016 to 2018.

== See also ==
- List of women architects
