= Dalaba Prefecture =

Coordinates: 10.6917°N 12.2500°W

- Prefecture
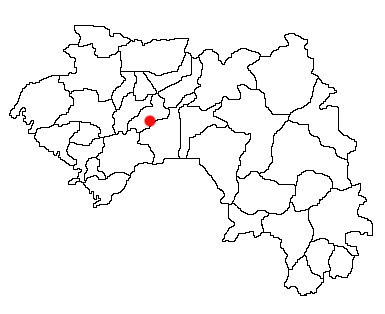
- Location of Dalaba Prefecture and seat in Guinea.
- Country: Guinea
- Region: Mamou Region
- Capital: Dalaba

Area
  - Total: 4,400 km^{2} (1,700 sq mi)

Population
  - Total: 155,000
  - Density: 35/km^{2} (91/sq mi)
- Time zone: UTC+0 (Guinea Standard Time)

Dalaba (Pular: 𞤍𞤢𞤤𞤭𞥅𞤪𞤫 𞤁𞤢𞤤𞤢𞤦𞤢𞥄) is a prefecture located in the Mamou Region of Guinea. The capital is Dalaba. The prefecture covers an area of 4,400 km² and has an estimated population of 155,000.

== Sub-prefectures ==
The prefecture is divided administratively into 10 sub-prefectures:

1. Dalaba-Centre
2. Bodié
3. Ditinn
4. Kaala
5. Kankalabé
6. Kébali
7. Koba
8. Mafara
9. Mitty
10. Mombéyah
