= Dalaba =

- Town and Prefecture
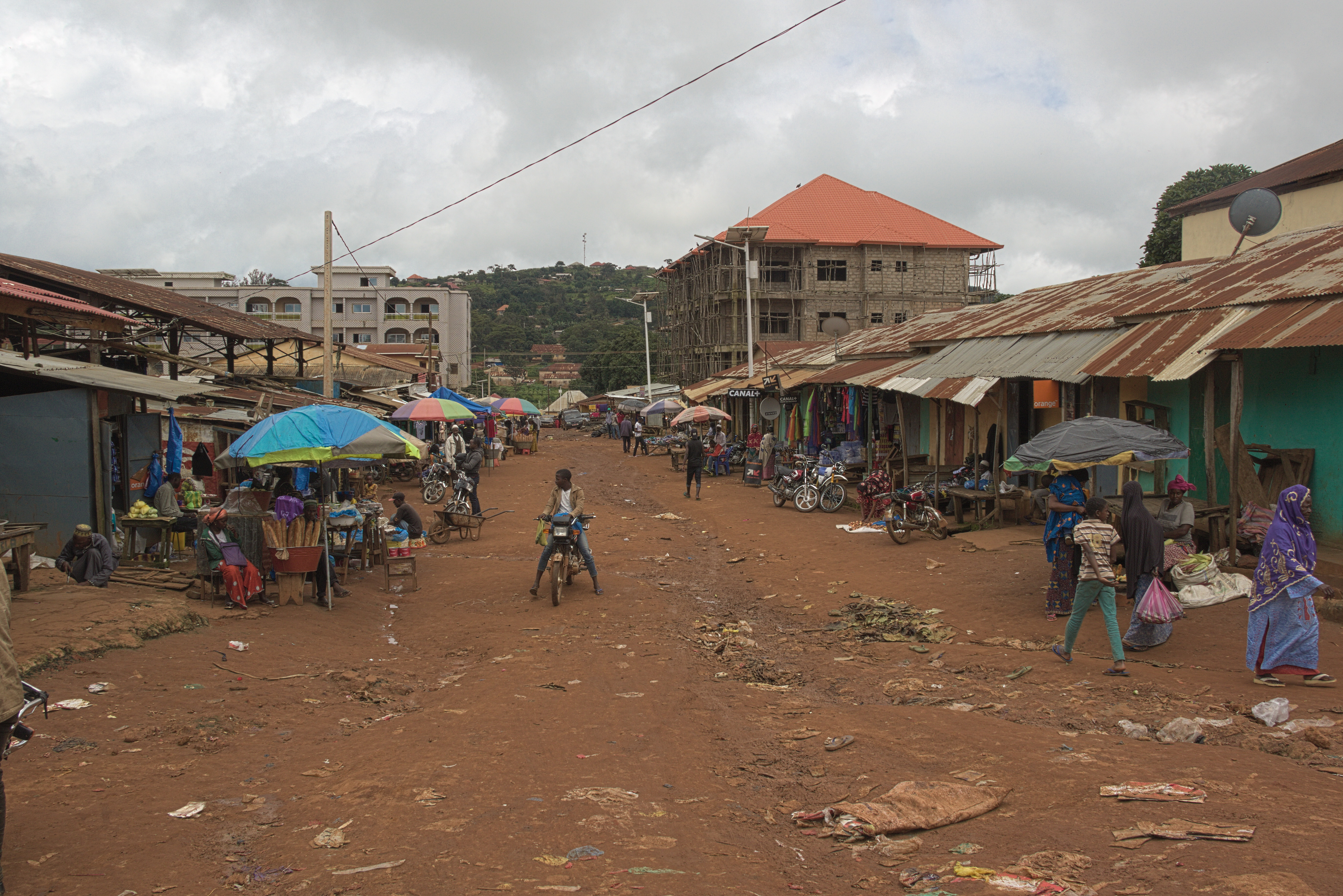

- Location in Guinea
- Coordinates: 10°41′30″N 12°15′0″W
- Country: Guinea
- Region: Mamou Region
- Prefecture: Dalaba

Population (2008)
  - Total: 6,349

Dalaba (Pular : 𞤁𞤢𞤤𞤢𞤦𞤢𞥄) is a town and sub-prefecture in the Dalaba Prefecture in the Mamou Region of Guinea.

It was once home to a sanatorium, and to Miriam Makeba, who last visited the town in 1988, when she came to see her niece, N'Tombi Makeba, who lived in Miriam's house (a round building dating to the French colonial period, but using the same form as traditional homes in the region) for a number of years in the 1980s. The town is also known for its local strawberries. The town of Dalaba is the highest (in altitude) town in Guinea. It is approximately 200 km by air from the capital Conakry and about 280 km by road. The inhabitants of Dalaba are mostly Fula (French: Peul; Fula: Fulɓe).

The market day in Dalaba is Sunday.

The women of Dalaba dye cotton damask fabric a rich-hued indigo in detailed tie-dyed patterns.

== Climate ==
Like the rest of the Futa Djalon region of which it is part, Dalaba's climate is moderated by the altitude. It was a popular retreat area for French during the colonial period largely for that reason. It is said locally that there was snowfall in Dalaba once in the 1930s.

== History ==
The French botanist Auguste Chevalier experimented with the planting of certain pine species in the vicinity of Dalaba in the early 1900s. That area was known as the Chevalier arboretum, but is now called the Barry Gassimou garden.
