= Dongol-Touma =

- Sub-prefecture and town
- Location in Guinea
- Coordinates: 10°55′N 12°30′W
- Country: Guinea
- Region: Mamou Region
- Prefecture: Pita Prefecture
- Time zone: UTC+0 (GMT)

Dongol-Maci is a town and sub-prefecture in the Pita Prefecture in the Mamou Region of northern-central Guinea. According to its 2014 census, it has 23,569 inhabitants.

Dongol-Maci has 11 specialised districts:

- Donghol Centre (the urbanised central seat)
- Doucki
- Doukoukou
- Bouléré
- Bambaya
- Ndalao
- Kadiel
- Kalilamban
- Pellal
- Guemé
- Taïré
