= Bafing-Falémé =

Coordinates: 12°00′N 11°30′W

Designations

Ramsar Wetland
- Designated: 16 October 2007
- Reference no.: 1719

Bafing–Falémé is a Ramsar wetland of Guinea. Established in 2007, it covers an area of 5,173 square kilometres (1,997 sq mi).
