= Mamou Prefecture =

Coordinates: 10.3833°N 12.0833°W

- Prefecture
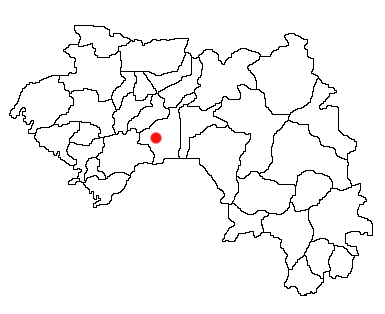
- Location of Mamou Prefecture and seat in Guinea.
- Country: Guinea
- Region: Mamou Region
- Capital: Mamou

Area
  - Total: 8,000 km^{2} (3,100 sq mi)

Population
  - Total: 222,000
  - Density: 28/km^{2} (72/sq mi)
- Time zone: UTC+0 (Guinea Standard Time)

Mamou (Pular: 𞤍𞤢𞤤𞤭𞥅𞤪𞤫 𞤃𞤢𞥄𞤥𞤵𞤲) is a prefecture located in the Mamou Region of Guinea. The capital is Mamou. The prefecture covers an area of 8,000 km.² and has an estimated population of 222,000.

== Sub-prefectures ==
The prefecture is divided administratively into 14 sub-prefectures:

1. Mamou-Centre
2. Bouliwel
3. Dounet
4. Gongoret
5. Kégnéko
6. Konkouré
7. Nyagara
8. Ouré-Kaba
9. Porédaka
10. Saramoussaya
11. Soyah
12. Téguéréya
13. Timbo
14. Tolo
