= Konkouré =

- Sub-prefecture and town
- Location in Guinea
- Coordinates: 10°17′N 12°14′W
- Country: Guinea
- Region: Mamou Region
- Prefecture: Mamou Prefecture
- Time zone: UTC+0 (GMT)

Designations

Ramsar Wetland
- Designated: 18 November 1992
- Reference no.: 575

Konkouré is a town and sub-prefecture in the Mamou Prefecture in the Mamou Region of Guinea.
