= Energy in Guinea =

Three primary energy sources make up the energy mix in Guinea: fossil biomass, oil and hydropower. Biomass (firewood and charcoal) makes the largest contribution in primary energy consumption. It is locally produced, while Guinea imports all the petroleum products it needs. The potential for hydroelectric power generation is high, but largely untapped. Electricity is not available to a high percentage of Guineans, especially in rural areas, and service is intermittent, even in the capital city of Conakry.

== Consumption and access ==
The estimated 2012 national consumption was 903 million kWh. Consumption per individual was less than the equivalent of half a ton of petroleum, broken down into 80% from biomass, 18% from hydrocarbons and 2% from electricity.

At the national level, 34% of the population have access to electricity. In rural areas where 8.1 million people reside, 7% have access to electricity.

== Biomass ==
In 1995, firewood was by far the greatest source of energy, accounting for 85%. In 2008, biomass accounted for 89%. According to a 2012 International Monetary Fund paper, over 74% of households use firewood for cooking. 23% use charcoal.

== Electricity ==
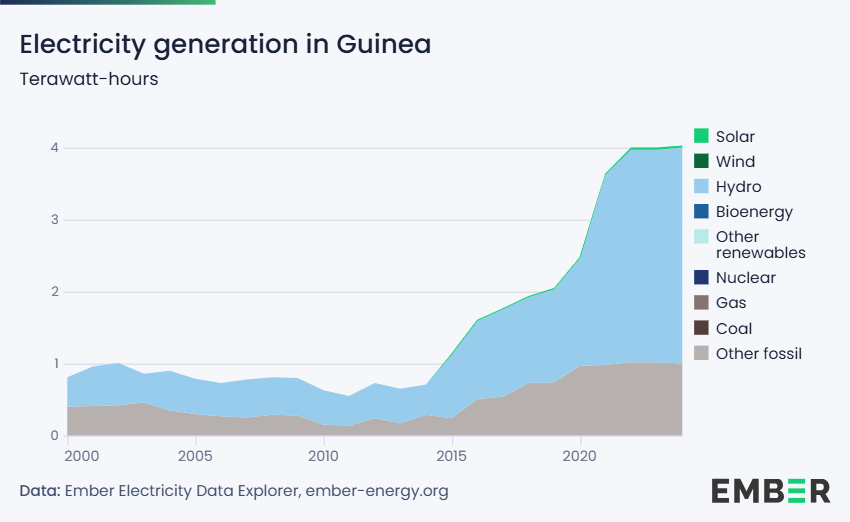
Electricity generation in Guinea in terawatt-hours

The Electricité Nationale de Guinée (National Electricity Company of Guinea) is responsible for all production and distribution of electricity in the country. However, service is poor; even households in Conakry are served less than 12 hours a day. According to The World Factbook, as of 2013, only 53% of urban areas and 11% of rural areas had access to electricity, leaving 8.7 million people without it. There is also a sharp east-west divide: west of the Ouré-Kaba-Tougué axis, nearly 30% had electricity, but that figure dropped to barely over 5% to the east.

In 2013, electricity production was an estimated 971 million kWh. In 2012, an estimated 67.8% of the electricity was obtained from fossil fuel and the remainder from hydroelectric plants. The country has considerable hydropower potential—about 6000 megawatts (MW) or 19,300 GWh annually—but taps only a small percentage of it.

The country is currently engaged in interconnection projects such as the sub-regional Organisation pour la mise en valeur du fleuve Sénégal (Sénégal River Basin Development Organization), Organisation pour la mise en valeur du fleuve Gambie (Gambia River Basin Development Organization) and West African Power Pool.

== Oil ==
The country has no known reserves. It imported an estimated 9,089 bbl/day in 2012.

== Renewable energy ==
Guinea is believed to have substantial potential for renewable energy. Potential resources for hydroelectricity is estimated at 4,740 MW. Government policy seeks to improve energy efficiency, increase the share of renewables, and cut local electricity tariffs.

The country plans to install off-grid solar systems in rural areas to improve access to electricity. The mini-grids will have capacities between 10 kilowatts to 10 MW.

== See also ==
- List of power stations in Guinea
