= Pita Prefecture =

Coordinates: 11.0588°N 12.3995°W

- Prefecture
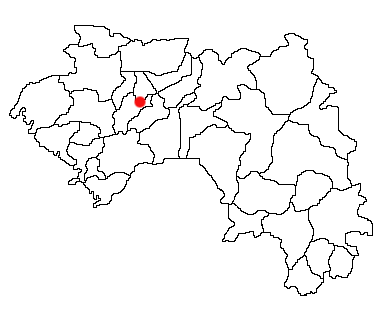
- Location of Pita Prefecture and seat in Guinea.
- Country: Guinea
- Region: Mamou Region
- Capital: Pita

Area
  - Total: 4,320 km^{2} (1,670 sq mi)

Population
  - Total: 266,000
  - Density: 61.6/km^{2} (159/sq mi)
- Time zone: UTC+0 (Guinea Standard Time)

Pita (Pular: 𞤍𞤢𞤤𞤭𞥅𞤪𞤫 𞤆𞤭𞤼𞤢) is a prefecture located in the Mamou Region of Guinea. The capital is Pita. The prefecture covers an area of 4,320 km.² and has an estimated population of 266,000.

== Sub-prefectures ==
The prefecture is divided administratively into 12 sub-prefectures:

1. Pita-Centre
2. Bantignel
3. Bourouwal-Tappé
4. Dongol-Touma
5. Gongore
6. Ley-Miro
7. Maci
8. Ninguélandé
9. Sangaréah
10. Sintali
11. Timbi-Madina
12. Timbi-Touny
13. Djindjin
14. Keriwel
