= Nialama Classified Forest =

Forest in Guinea

- Location within Guinea
- Location: Fouta Djalon region, Guinea
- Nearest city: Linsan, Guinea
- Coordinates: 11°34′33″N 12°46′28″W
- Area: 10,000 ha (25,000 acres)

Nialama Classified Forest, also spelled Nyalama, is found in the Fouta Djalon highland region of north-west Guinea.

== Geography and environment ==
The forest has an area of 10,000 ha and an elevation of 200-900 m above sea level. The site includes hills, cliffs and escarpments, hills, a gently undulating, low-lying plain, and seasonal swamps. It is vegetated with a mosaic of dense gallery forest, open forest, savanna woodland and grassland, with patches of Oxytenanthera abyssinica bamboo. The main forest species are Parkia biglobosa and Pterocarpus erinaceus, with Afzelia africana and Elaeis guineensis on the savanna. Average annual rainfall is 1,145 mm.

=== Wildlife ===
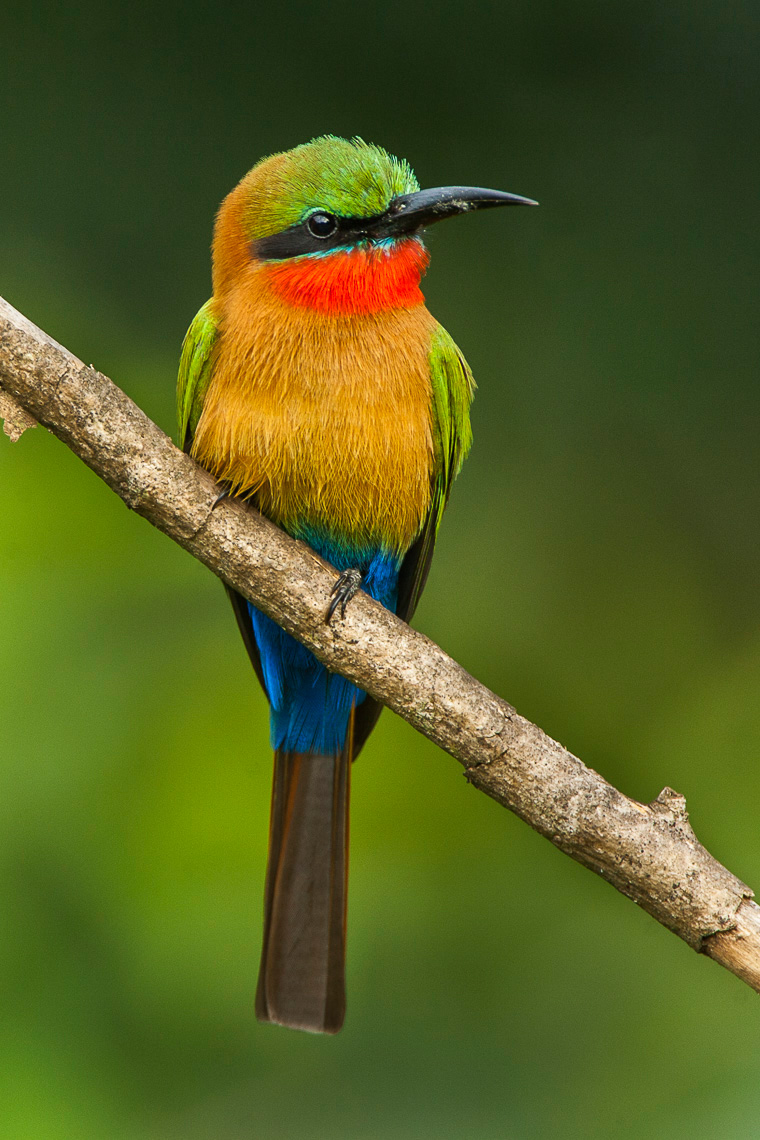
Red-throated bee-eater

Results of a survey in 1998 as part of the follow-up to the Projet de Conservation des Chimpanzes en Guinee indicated four social groups of western chimpanzees were living in the park, three of which took permanent residence in their respective blocks. The total population of these four groups was estimated to be 83 individuals.

The forest has been designated an Important Bird Area (IBA) by BirdLife International because it supports significant populations of violet turacos, red-throated bee-eaters, blue-bellied rollers, bearded barbets, fox kestrels, Senegal parrots, piapiacs, white-crowned robin-chats, chestnut-crowned sparrow-weavers and Sahel bush sparrows.
