= Tinkisso =

- Village
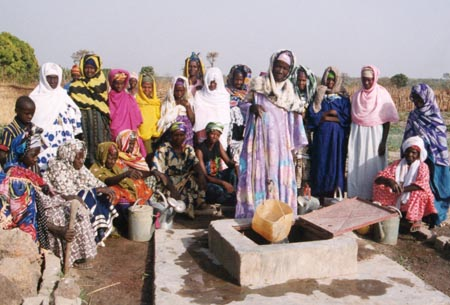

- Location in Guinea
- Coordinates: 10°31′N 11°27′W
- Country: Guinea
- Region: Faranah Region
- Prefecture: Dinguiraye Prefecture
- Time zone: UTC+0 (GMT)

Designations

Ramsar Wetland
- Designated: 17 January 2002
- Reference no.: 1168

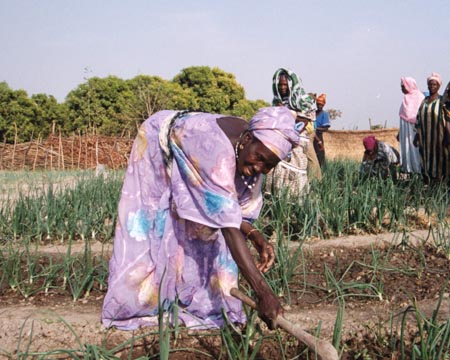
Farmers cooperative in Tinkisso.

Tinkisso is a village in the Dinguiraye Prefecture of Guinea. The Tinkisso River and dam is important to the local economy. The economy is based on mining and agriculture.
