= Souapiti Hydropower Station =

Dam in on the Konkoure River, Guinea

Souapiti Hydropower Station 苏阿皮蒂水电站
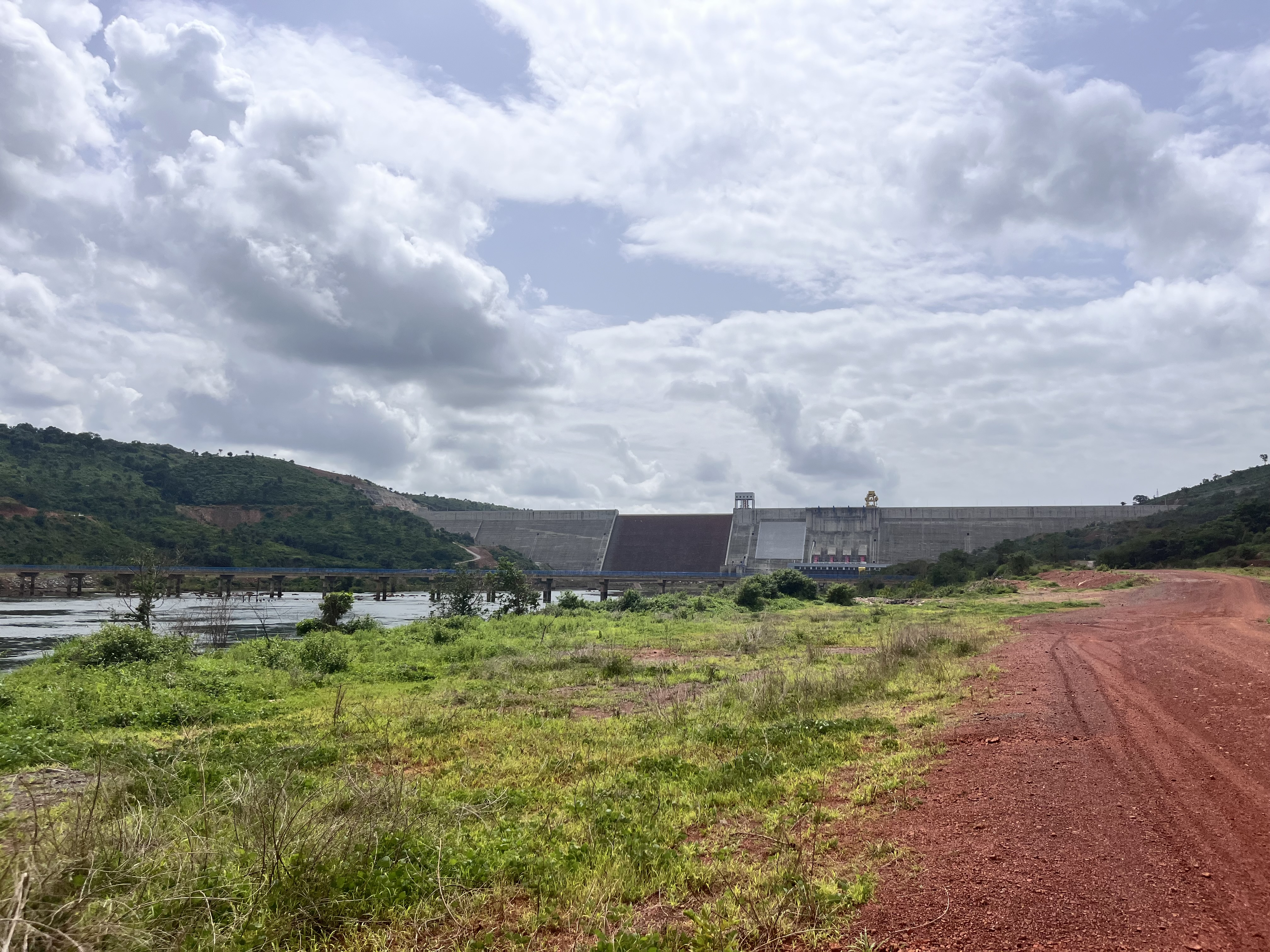

- Location within Guinea
- Country: Republic of Guinea
- Location: on the Konkoure River
- Coordinates: 10.42°N 13.26°W
- Purpose: Power
- Construction began: December 22, 2015
- Construction cost: $2 billion

The Souapiti Hydropower Station (Chinese: 苏阿皮蒂水电站), also known as Souapiti Hydropower Project or Souapiti Hydropower Plant, is a water conservancy project in the Republic of Guinea, located on the Konkoure River, with a total installed capacity of 550 MW. This project was constructed by China International Water & Electric Corporation (CWE). The generating station is expected to cost about $2 billion.

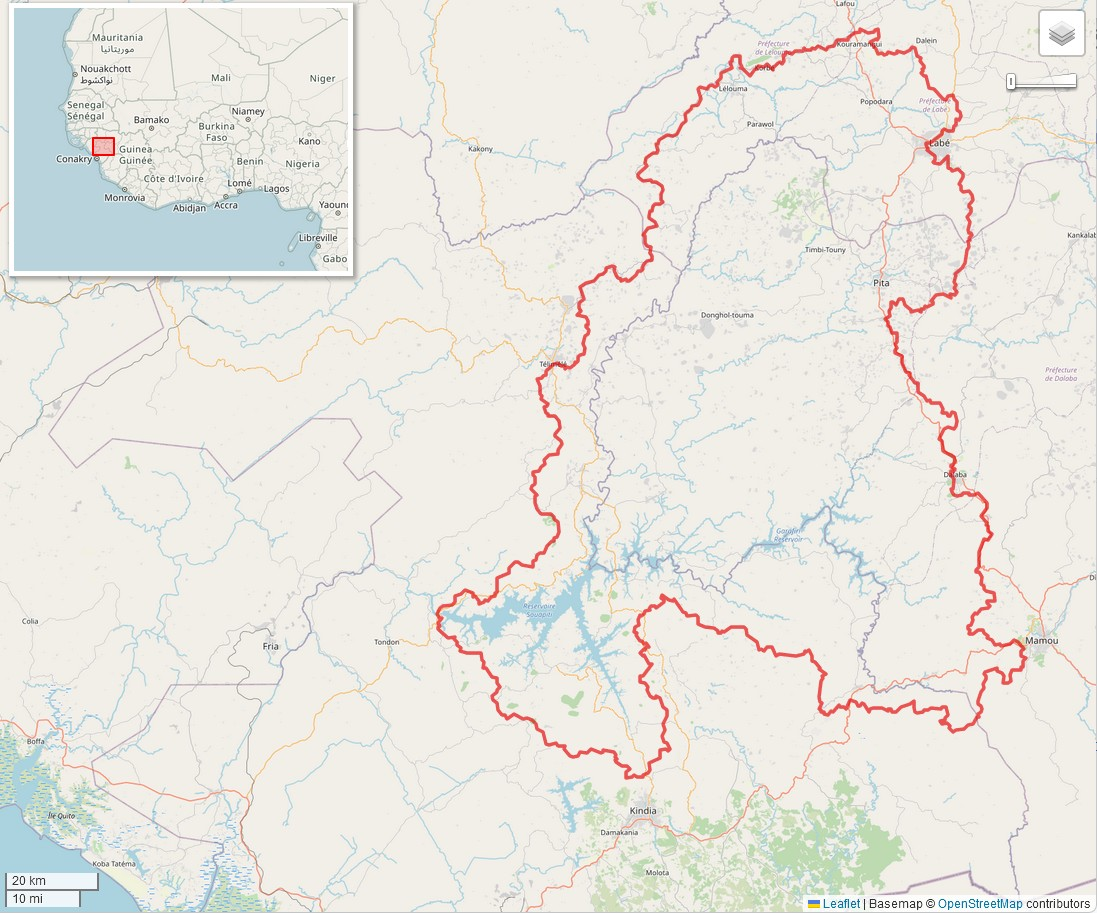
Drainage Basin of the Souapiti Dam and Reservoir (Interactive map)

== History ==
The groundbreaking ceremony for the Souapiti Hydropower Station was held on December 22, 2015.

The hydropower plant was completed and put into operation in 2021.

Large dam projects have historically had negative impacts on the environment and local communities, which are displaced by reservoir flooding. In response, many dam builders and funders agreed to a set of principles created by the World Commission on Dams in 2000. According to the nonprofit International Rivers, the residents of Madina Tahiré, Tènè Kansa and Khouloufa (located in the Dubreka prefecture North West of Guinea) were not adequately consulted on dam construction. Villagers were relocated to locations with infertile land and inadequate water supply, in violation of their human rights and international law.
