= Mamou =

- Sub-prefecture and town
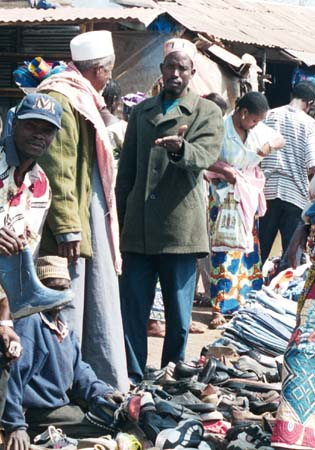
- Mamou market

- Location in Guinea
- Coordinates: 10°23′N 12°05′W
- Country: Guinea
- Region: Mamou Region
- Prefecture: Mamou Prefecture

Government
  - Mayor: Elhadj Amadou Tidjane Diallo

Population (2018)
  - Total: 376,269
  - Religions: Islam

Mamou (Pular: 𞤃𞤢𞥄𞤥𞤵𞤲) is a city and sub-prefecture in a valley of the Fouta Djallon area of Guinea. The population is 376,269 (2018 est).

== History ==
It grew around the railway line from Conakry to Kankan and soon became the local administrative headquarters. Its main industry used to be until the 1990s decade meat processing, while it also acts as an important transport hub. All vehicles going to the Fouta Jallon, the forest region or Haute Guinée have to travel through Mamou.

== Climate ==
Mamou has a tropical savanna climate (Köppen climate classification Aw).

Climate data for Mamou (1991–2020)
Month	Jan	Feb	Mar	Apr	May	Jun	Jul	Aug	Sep	Oct	Nov	Dec	Year
Mean daily maximum °C (°F)	31.5 (88.7)	33.4 (92.1)	34.3 (93.7)	33.4 (92.1)	30.8 (87.4)	28.2 (82.8)	26.6 (79.9)	26.3 (79.3)	27.4 (81.3)	28.6 (83.5)	30.2 (86.4)	31.0 (87.8)	30.1 (86.2)
Mean daily minimum °C (°F)	14.1 (57.4)	15.9 (60.6)	17.9 (64.2)	20.0 (68.0)	19.0 (66.2)	18.4 (65.1)	18.0 (64.4)	18.0 (64.4)	17.8 (64.0)	17.6 (63.7)	16.3 (61.3)	14.2 (57.6)	17.3 (63.1)
Average precipitation mm (inches)	4.7 (0.19)	3.2 (0.13)	18.9 (0.74)	81.2 (3.20)	148.8 (5.86)	221.7 (8.73)	315.5 (12.42)	424.8 (16.72)	328.8 (12.94)	199.7 (7.86)	43.8 (1.72)	2.2 (0.09)	1,793.3 (70.60)
Average relative humidity (%)	36	38	43	55	71	79	83	83	81	78	65	46	63
Source: NOAA (humidity 1961–1990)

== Schools ==
- Lycee Amilcar Cabra
- Institut Supérieur de Technologie Mamou
- École privée Lamarana Diallo

== Hospitals ==
- Hôpital Regional De Mamou

== Religious buildings ==
- Grande Mosquée de Mamou

== Notable people ==
- Fatoumata Barry, Guineas's first woman architect.

== See also ==
- Railway stations in Guinea
