= Mamou Region =

Region of Guinea

Mamou
- Region
- Mamou Region in Guinea
- Coordinates: 10°39′N 12°05′W
- Country: Guinea
- Capital: Mamou

Government
  - Governor: Aly Badra Camara

Area
  - Total: 17,074 km^{2} (6,592 sq mi)

Population (2025 census)
  - Total: 916,535
  - Density: 53.680/km^{2} (139.03/sq mi)
- HDI (2023): 0.464 low · 5th of 8

Mamou Region (Pular: 𞤁𞤭𞥅𞤱𞤢𞤤 𞤃𞤢𞥄𞤥𞤵𞤲) is located in central Guinea. It is bordered by the country of Sierra Leone and the Guinean regions of Faranah, Labé, and Kindia.

== Administrative divisions ==
Mamou Region is divided into three prefectures; which are further sub-divided into 36 sub-prefectures:

- Dalaba Prefecture (10 sub-prefectures)
- Mamou Prefecture (14 sub-prefectures)
- Pita Prefecture (12 sub-prefectures)
