= University of Labé =

- Université de Labé
- Type: Public institution
- Affiliations: Gamal Abdel Nasser University of Conakry
- Rector: Dr. Mohamed Chérif Sow
- Students: 4900
- Location: Labé, Guinea; 11.225°N 12.389°W
- Language: French
- Website: Official website

The University of Labé (UL) is a public higher education institution in Guinea, located in Hafia in the Labé Prefecture. It operates under the supervision of the Ministry of Higher Education and Scientific Research.

== Location ==
The University of Labé is situated 22 km from the urban commune of Labé, 18 km from the Pita Prefecture, and 17 km from the sub-prefecture of Timbi-Madina. The university spans 180 hectares, distributed among the rural communes of Hafia, Garambé, and Dara-Labé.

== History ==
The University Center of Labé was established on 5 September 2001 along with the University of Nzérékoré. It was renamed the University of Labé on 21 October 2016.

The university has had five rectors since its inception:

List of Rectors
Name	Start date	End date
Professor Abdoul Goudoussi Diallo	2001	2004
Dr. Alkaly Bah	2004	2013
Dr. Amadou Baïlo Barry	2012	2014
Dr. Mamadou Dian Gongoré Diallo	2014	2021
Dr. Mohamed Chérif Sow	2021	Present

== Programs ==
The University of Labé currently offers 11 training programs:

- Faculty of Science and Technology
  - Bachelor's program in mathematics
  - Bachelor's program in computer science
  - Bachelor's program in MIAGE
  - Professional bachelor's program in applied biology
- Faculty of Arts and Humanities
  - Bachelor's program in sociology
  - Bachelor's program in English
  - Bachelor's program in Arabic
  - Bachelor's program in modern letters
- Faculty of Administrative and Management Sciences
  - Bachelor's program in public administration
  - Bachelor's program in economics
  - Bachelor's program in management
