= Tountouroun =

- Sub-prefecture and town
- Location in Guinea
- Coordinates: 11°25′N 12°17′W
- Country: Guinea
- Region: Labé Region
- Prefecture: Labé Prefecture
- Time zone: UTC+0 (GMT)

Tountouroun (Pular: 𞤂𞤫𞤧-𞤯𞤢𞤤𞤭𞥅𞤪𞤫 𞤚𞤵𞤲𞤼𞤵𞤪𞤵𞤲) is a town and sub-prefecture in the Labé Prefecture in the Labé Region of northern-central Guinea.
