= Bamba, Guinea =

Bamba
- Village
- Location in Guinea
- Coordinates: 7°54′3″N 8°47′1″W
- Country: Guinea
- Region: Nzérékoré Region
- Prefecture: Nzérékoré Prefecture
- Time zone: UTC+0 (GMT)

Bamba is a village in the Nzérékoré Prefecture in the Nzérékoré Region of south-eastern Guinea. It is located north of Nzérékoré city.
