= Beliehouma =

- Village
- Location in Guinea
- Coordinates: 7°52′10″N 8°45′12″W
- Country: Guinea
- Region: Nzérékoré Region
- Prefecture: Nzérékoré Prefecture
- Time zone: UTC+0 (GMT)

Beliehouma is a village in the Nzérékoré Prefecture in the Nzérékoré Region of south-eastern Guinea. It is located northeast of Nzérékoré and the N1 road running from the regional city passes through the village.
