= Yalenzou =

- Sub-prefecture and town
- Location in Guinea
- Coordinates: 7°43′N 8°41′W
- Country: Guinea
- Region: Nzérékoré Region
- Prefecture: Nzérékoré Prefecture
- Time zone: UTC+0 (GMT)

Yalenzou is a town and sub-prefecture in the Nzérékoré Prefecture in the Nzérékoré Region of Guinea. It is located southeast of Nzérékoré along the N2 road. The town of Nzao lies between Yalenzou and Nzérékoré.
