= Fouala =

- Sub-prefecture and town
- Location in Guinea
- Coordinates: 8°59′N 8°20′W
- Country: Guinea
- Region: Nzérékoré Region
- Prefecture: Beyla Prefecture
- Time zone: UTC+0 (GMT)

Fouala is a town and sub-prefecture in the Beyla Prefecture in the Nzérékoré Region of south-eastern Guinea.
