= Bounouma =

- Sub-prefecture and town
- Location in Guinea
- Coordinates: 7°38′25″N 8°47′54″W
- Country: Guinea
- Region: Nzérékoré Region
- Prefecture: Nzérékoré Prefecture
- Time zone: UTC+0 (GMT)

Bounouma is a town and sub-prefecture in the Nzérékoré Prefecture in the Nzérékoré Region of Guinea.
