= Fangamadou =

- Sub-prefecture and town
- Location in Guinea
- Coordinates: 8°30′N 10°36′W
- Country: Guinea
- Region: Nzérékoré Region
- Prefecture: Guéckédou Prefecture
- Time zone: UTC+0 (GMT)

Fangamadou is a town and sub-prefecture in the Guéckédou Prefecture in the Nzérékoré Region of south-western Guinea, near the border of Sierra Leone.
