= Konyan =

Guinea

Konyan is a historical region located in the Nzérékoré Region of Guinea. Its main town is Beyla. It is a high broad plateau at the edge of the kola zone, and was the birthplace of Samori Ture.
