= Batoata =

- Village
- Location in Guinea
- Coordinates: 7°52′29″N 8°39′37″W
- Country: Guinea
- Region: Nzérékoré Region
- Prefecture: Nzérékoré Prefecture
- Time zone: UTC+0 (GMT)

Batoata is a village in the Nzérékoré Prefecture in the Nzérékoré Region of south-eastern Guinea.
