= Termessadou-Dibo =

- Sub-prefecture and town
- Location in Guinea
- Coordinates: 8°42′N 10°15′W
- Country: Guinea
- Region: Nzérékoré Region
- Prefecture: Guéckédou Prefecture
- Time zone: UTC+0 (GMT)

Termessadou-Dibo is a town and sub-prefecture in the Guéckédou Prefecture in the Nzérékoré Region of south-western Guinea, near the borders of Sierra Leone and Liberia.
