= Balimou =

- Village
- Balimou
- Location in Guinea
- Coordinates: 7°45′50″N 8°33′51″W
- Country: Guinea
- Region: Nzérékoré Region
- Prefecture: Nzérékoré Prefecture
- Time zone: UTC+0 (GMT)

Balimou is a village in the Nzérékoré Prefecture in the Nzérékoré Region of south-eastern Guinea.
