= Samana =

The term Samaná or Samana may mean several things:

== Places ==
=== Dominican Republic ===
- Samaná Province, a province in the Dominican Republic
- Samaná (town), or Santa Bárbara de Samaná, the capital of Samaná Province
- Samaná Peninsula
- Samaná Bay, a body of water in the Atlantic next to the Samaná Peninsula
- Samaná El Catey International Airport

=== Other ===
- Samana Cay, an uninhabited island
- Samaná, Caldas, a town and municipality in the Colombian Department of Caldas
- Samaná Norte River, a river in Antioquia Department, Colombia
- Samana, India, a town in Patiala district in the Indian state of Punjab
  - Samana Assembly constituency
- Samana Range, a mountain range in Pakistan near Peshawar
- Samana, Guinea

== People ==
- Samana, Samaṇa, or śramaṇa, the name for certain wandering ascetics from the Indian subcontinent, one of whom was Gautama Buddha
- Samana, the mother of Imam Ali al-Hadi
- Natthaphong Samana (born 1984), Thai footballer

== Other ==
- Samaná Americans, a community of descendants of 19th century U.S. freed people of color in the Dominican Republic
- Samaná English, spoken by the Samaná Americans
- Samana (moth), a genus of moths in the family Geometridae
- Samana hutia, an extinct species of rodent in the family Capromyidae
- Saamana, an Indian Marathi-language newspaper
- Samna (film), a 1974 Indian Marathi-language crime drama
- Śramaṇa or samana, ascetic orders in ancient India including Jains and Buddhists
  - Sramanera, a Buddhist novice
  - Sramanachegas, 1st-century BC Indian philosopher and monk
  - Samanar or samana, term for Jains in Tamil Nadu
    - Samanar Hills, Tamil Nadu, India, holy to the Jains
