= 2021 Guinea Marburg virus disease outbreak =

Disease outbreak in Guinea

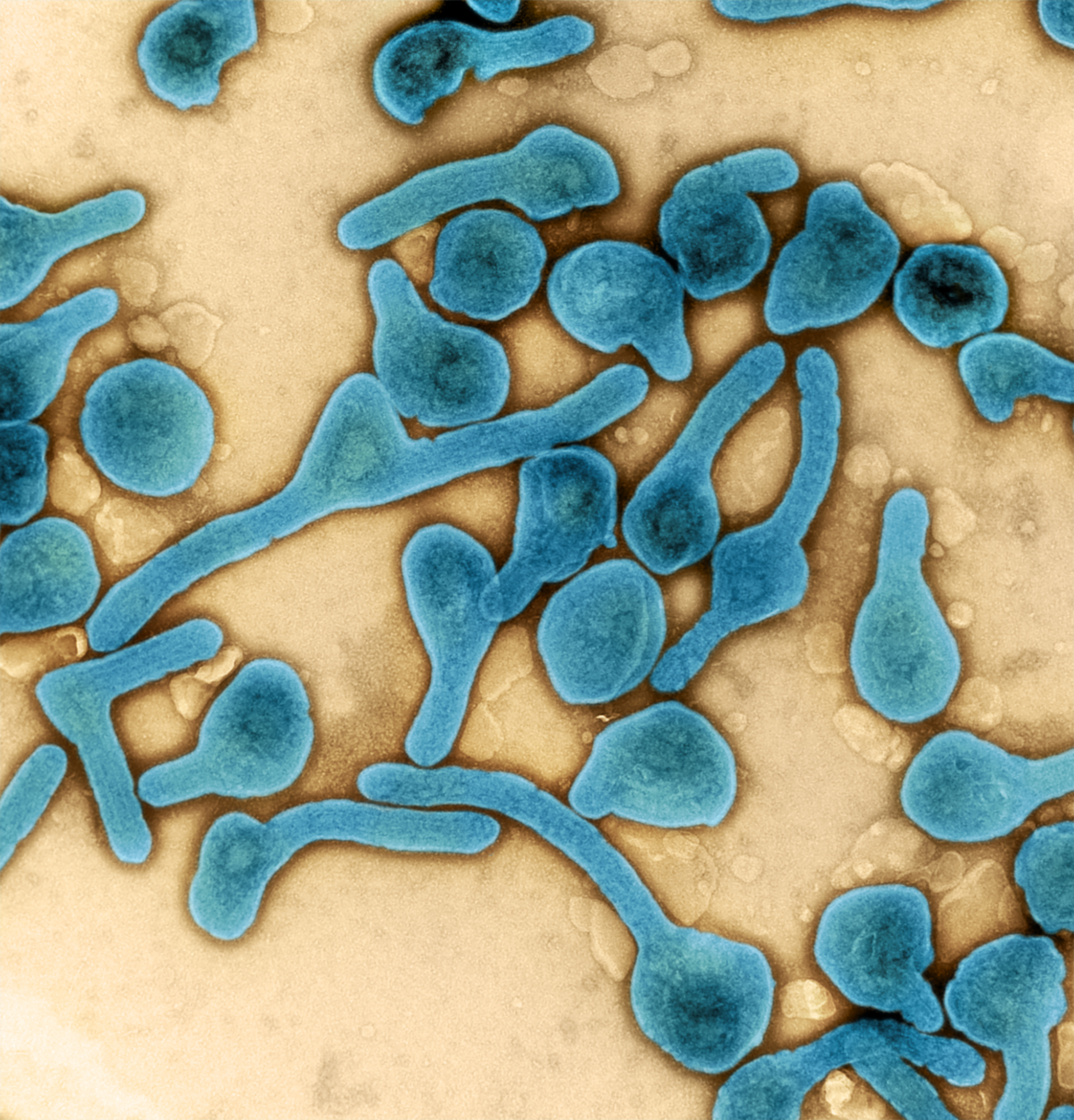
- Colorized Marburg virus particles
- Disease: Marburg virus disease
- Source: Egyptian Rousette bats
- Location: Guinea
- Date: 25 July 2021 - 16 September 2021
- Confirmed cases: 1
- Deaths: 1
- Fatality rate: 24-90%

The outbreak of Marburg virus disease in Gueckedou district, Guinea started in July 2021, and ended in September. A single individual got sick and died of the virus, with no other known cases.

== Background ==
Marburg virus disease is a highly virulent, epidemic-prone disease, associated with a high case-fatality ratio of 24-90%. In the early phase of the disease, it is hard to distinguish the disease from other diseases. There are no specific treatments or vaccine against the Marburg virus, though supportive care increases the likelihood of survival. 14 outbreaks of the disease have been reported since 1967, when it was first detected, mostly in sub-Saharan Africa.

The disease's usual reservoir species is Egyptian Rousette bats. Among humans, it is transmitted via direct contact with the bodily fluids of an infected individual.

== Outbreak ==
The index case, a 46-year-old farmer from Temessadou M'Boké village in Guéckédou prefecture, got his first symptoms on July 25. The patient died on August 2. On August 3, a Polymerase Chain Reaction (PCR) test was conducted, returning a positive result for the Marburg virus on August 5. The WHO was informed of the first case the next day. On August 9, the Institut Pasteur Dakar in Senegal provided reconfirmation that the result was positive for the Marburg virus. Sequencing of an isolate from the Guinean patient showed that this outbreak was caused by the Angola-like Marburg virus.

Guinea health authorities conducted contact tracing and monitored 170 known high-risk contacts of the index case. No new cases were detected for twice the length of the incubation period of the virus, in this case 42 day, so the outbreak was declared over around six weeks after it started.

WHO's Africa director Matshidiso Moeti, among others, praised Guinea's rapid and effective response to the outbreak.

== Investigation ==
A team of WHO specialists arrived in Temessadou M'bokét in August–September 2021 for an epidemiological investigation of the case and searched for the Marburg virus reservoir. The team conducted bat trapping in the immediate vicinity of the village of Temessadou M'bokét, as well as in the vicinity of neighboring villages (Baladou Pebal and Koundou).

The patient had limited social interactions and lived in a household of four people. There was no evidence of a travel history outside Guinea for the patient or his close contacts or of contact with returning travelers. He was a farmer living in close contact with nature and wildlife and may therefore have had repeated exposure to an environment or food contaminated with excreta of MARV-infected bats. Community surveys showed that although he may have harvested wild fruits for personal consumption, there was no suggestion that he had visited caves or been involved in hunting activities for bushmeat, including bats.

Previously, in 2017–2018, Marburg virus was detected in the Egyptian rousette bats (Rousettus aegyptiacus) in the neighboring Sierra Leone. This was the first detection of Marburg virus in West Africa. Phylogenetic analysis revealed that at least two genetic variants of Marburg virus circulate in bats in Sierra Leone: Angola-like Marburg virus and Marburg virus, which are genetically similar to variants from Uganda, Gabon, and the Democratic Republic of Congo (DRC). The presence of Marburg virus in the fruit bats in Guinea was confirmed in 2022: a colony of Egyptian rousettus bats with infected animals was found in close proximity (4.5 km) to the Temessadou M'bokét village. Marburg virus isolated from these animals belonged to the Angola-like lineage as well as the isolate obtained from the index-case patient.
