= Kassadou =

- Sub-prefecture and town
- Location in Guinea
- Coordinates: 8°55′N 10°21′W
- Country: Guinea
- Region: Nzérékoré Region
- Prefecture: Guéckédou Prefecture
- Time zone: UTC+0 (GMT)

Kassadou is a town and sub-prefecture in the Guéckédou Prefecture in the Nzérékoré Region of south-western Guinea.
