= Bowé =

- Sub-prefecture and town
- Location in Guinea
- Coordinates: 8°6′N 8°50′W
- Country: Guinea
- Region: Nzérékoré Region
- Prefecture: Yomou Prefecture
- Time zone: UTC+0 (GMT)

Bowé is a town and sub-prefecture in the Yomou Prefecture in the Nzérékoré Region of south-eastern Guinea.
