= Guendembou =

- Sub-prefecture and town
- Location in Guinea
- Coordinates: 8°50′N 10°03′W
- Country: Guinea
- Region: Nzérékoré Region
- Prefecture: Guéckédou Prefecture
- Time zone: UTC+0 (GMT)

Guendembou is a town and sub-prefecture in the Guéckédou Prefecture in the Nzérékoré Region of south-western Guinea.
