= Gouécké =

- Sub-prefecture and town
- Location in Guinea
- Coordinates: 8°1′N 8°43′W
- Country: Guinea
- Region: Nzérékoré Region
- Prefecture: Nzérékoré Prefecture
- Time zone: UTC+0 (GMT)

Gouécké or Gouéké is a town and sub-prefecture in the Nzérékoré Prefecture in the Nzérékoré Region of Guinea.

Three people died and four fell ill from an ebola outbreak on February 14, 2021.
