= Womey massacre =

2014 massacre in Womey, Guinea

The Womey massacre was a deadly attack on and murder of eight members of a team of healthcare workers, journalists, and government officials who were affiliated with the conflict resolution non-profit Search for Common Ground and WHO in mid-September 2014, traveled to the village of Womey in Guinea's southwest region to educate the local population during the West African Ebola virus epidemic outbreak. The team had come to warn the village about dangers of the Ebola virus disease. By 24 September 2014, Ebola disease was reported to have killed over 600 people in Guinea during previous months.

== Context ==
The attack on the Ebola Health Team in Womey, Guinea is related to the mistrust and miscommunication between villagers and the Guinean government. After the attack, a local police officer named Richard Haba explained the villagers' belief that Ebola "is nothing more than an invention of white people to kill black people". The underlying problem is believed to be fear. A coordinator with Search for Common Ground, Aly Badara, said, "In that part of Guinea, there is no faith between those people and their government."

== Summary ==
Location of Nzérékoré nearby where the team was killed is shown in relation to the capital Conakry. Womey is 900 kilometres (560 mi) from the capital city.

On 18 September, it was reported that the bodies of a team of Guinean health and government officials, accompanied by journalists, who had been distributing Ebola information and doing disinfection work, were found in a latrine in the town of Womey, 50 kilometres (31 mi) from Nzérékoré. The workers had been murdered by residents of the village after they initially went missing after a riot against the presence of the health education team. Government officials said "the bodies showed signs of being attacked with machetes and clubs" and "three of them had their throats slit."

== Incident ==
When the group first arrived at the village, people threw stones at them, causing the group to split up, with nine people trying to hide near the town of Womey, and others taking refuge near Nzérékoré. Of those nine people, only one successfully hid and survived. The other eight members of the group were killed. The survivor, a journalist, said that they heard the villagers searching around for them. The team consisted of health workers, government officials, one priest, and journalists.

The bodies were found in a latrine with evidence of being struck with clubs and machetes, and three were found with their throats slit. The bodies were found in the septic tank of the local school. As the evidence was found, six were arrested in connection with the attack(s). By 22 September 2014 twenty people were arrested, and by 24 September 2014 Guinea police had arrested 27 suspects in connection with the attack. By 21 April 2015, the courts convicted eleven of those and issued life sentences.

== Victims ==
The team included at least two doctors, including the Health Director of the prefecture and the Deputy Director of the hospital in the area. Also a pastor who worked at a local Christian church and was one of the founders of Hope Clinic, which provides medical care and surgeries. One of the journalists, Facely Camara, worked for Zaly Liberté FM while two others, Sidiki Sidibé and Molou Chérif, worked for Radio Rurale de N'Zérékoré. They are local radio stations based in Nzérékoré (N'Zérékoré). Nzérékoré is the second largest city in Guinea with a population greater than 300 thousand in 2008, and is the capital of Nzérékoré Prefecture.

== Impact ==
After the attack, the Ebola crisis was seen as both a worldwide health crisis as well as a security risk.

== Reactions ==
Irina Bokova, the director-general of UNESCO condemned the killings of the health care team. Bokova's statement emphasized the important role that the media plays in fighting this outbreak, saying "with the virus spreading as it is, the role of the media in providing populations with up to date and relevant information is more important than ever".

Several media organizations -- the Union of Free Radio and Television Stations of Guinea, Guinean Association of Private Newspaper Publishers, and Guinean On-Line Media Association -- also jointly condemned the massacre.

== Related incidents ==
Later in September 2014, a Red Cross Team in Guinea was attacked while trying to collect corpses. Another medical charity had already pulled out of Guinea after multiple stoning attacks on their teams. In August 2014, there were riots in Nzérékoré when a team tried to disinfect a market. Nzérékoré is about 50 kilometres (31 mi) from Womey.

== See also ==
- Ebola virus epidemic in Guinea
