= Soulouta =

- Sub-prefecture and town
- Location in Guinea
- Coordinates: 7°58′23″N 8°40′58″W
- Country: Guinea
- Region: Nzérékoré Region
- Prefecture: Nzérékoré Prefecture
- Time zone: UTC+0 (GMT)

Soulouta or Souloutta is a town and sub-prefecture in the Nzérékoré Prefecture in the Nzérékoré Region of Guinea.
