= Nionsomoridougou =

- Location in Guinea
- Coordinates: 8°43′N 8°51′W
- Country: Guinea
- Region: Nzerekore Region

Population
  - Total: 1,639

Nionsomoridougou is a small, sparsely populated town in the Beyla Prefecture of the Nzérékoré Region of Guinea.

It borders Nionsomoridougou, Nionsamoridougou, Bagnidougou, and Bagbadougou. The nearest major cities are Daloa, Monrovia, Bouaké, and Yamoussoukro.
