= Diéké =

Djécké
- Sub-prefecture and town
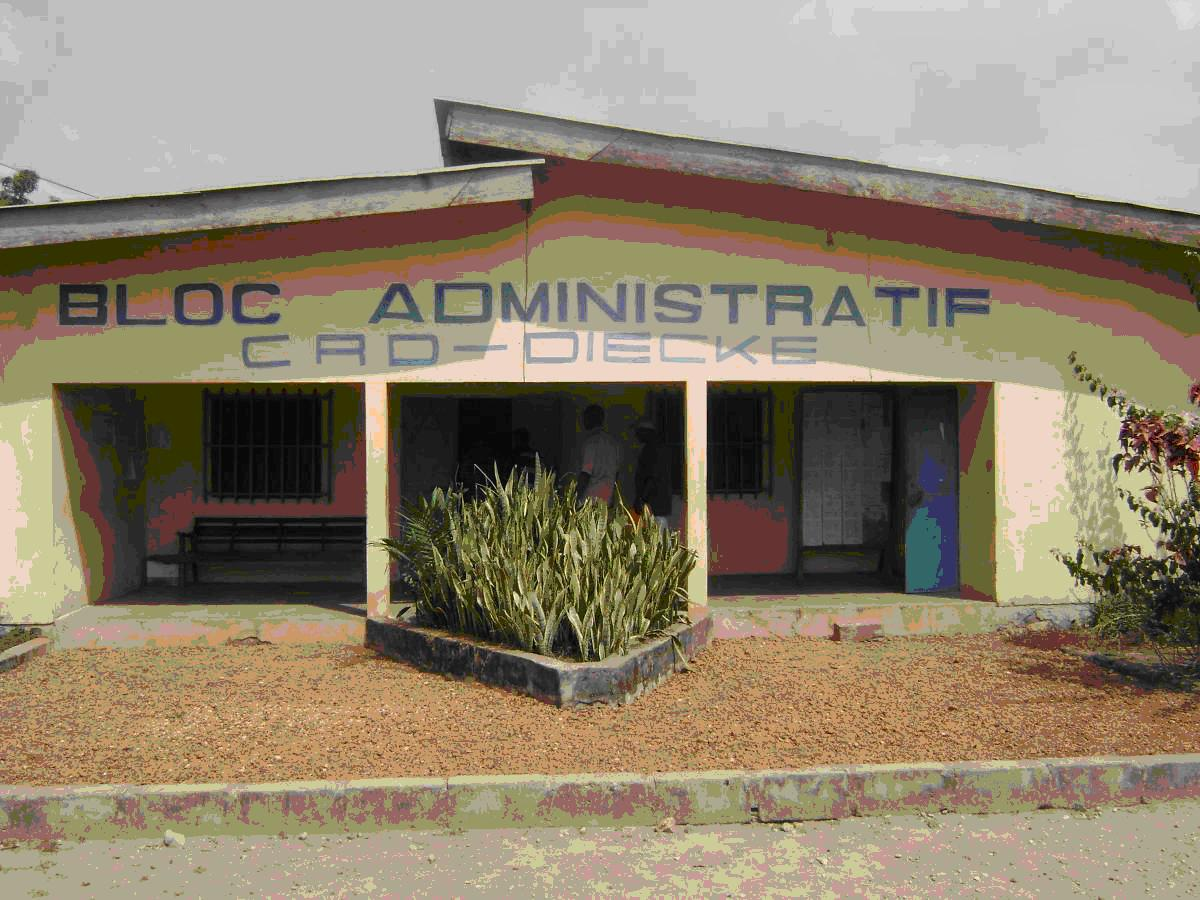

- Location in Guinea
- Coordinates: 7°20′54″N 8°57′15″W
- Country: Guinea
- Region: Nzérékoré Region
- Prefecture: Yomou Prefecture
- Elevation: 980 ft (300 m)
- Time zone: UTC+0 (GMT)

Diéké, Djécké or Diecke is a town and sub-prefecture in the Yomou Prefecture in the Nzérékoré Region of south-eastern Guinea.

== Mining ==
It is near the very large Simandou iron ore mines.

== Schools ==
- École de Santé de Diéké
- Lycée Méthodiste Unie de Diéké

== Hospitals ==
- Centre Médical Soguipa
- Clinique Saint Michel
- Centre de Santé de Diéké

== See also ==
- Transport in Guinea
