= Manda, Guinea =

Manda
- Sub-prefecture and town
- Location in Guinea
- Coordinates: 11°40′N 12°37′W
- Country: Guinea
- Region: Labé Region
- Prefecture: Lélouma Prefecture
- Time zone: UTC+0 (GMT)

Manda, Guinea is a town and sub-prefecture in the Lélouma Prefecture in the Labé Region of northern-central Guinea.
