= Boola =

Boola Ibraham Sangaré
- Sub-prefecture and town
- Location in Guinea
- Coordinates: 8°21′10″N 8°43′4″W
- Country: Guinea
- Region: Nzerekore Region
- Prefecture: Beyla Prefecture

Government
  - King: Mansa Ibraham, Sangaré

Boola is a town and sub-prefecture in the forest region in the Beyla Prefecture in the Republic of Guinea.
