= Koulé =

- Sub-prefecture and town
- Location in Guinea
- Coordinates: 7°46′43″N 8°57′33″W
- Country: Guinea
- Region: Nzérékoré Region
- Prefecture: Nzérékoré Prefecture
- Time zone: UTC+0 (GMT)

Koulé is a town and sub-prefecture in the Nzérékoré Prefecture in the Nzérékoré Region of Guinea.

The name Koulé come from the Kpelle "koule-be", which means "stay here".

== Transport ==
It lies near or on the route of the proposed standard gauge Transguinean Railways.

== See also ==
- Railway stations in Guinea
- Transport in Guinea
