= Popodara =

Coordinates: 11°24′N 12°24′W

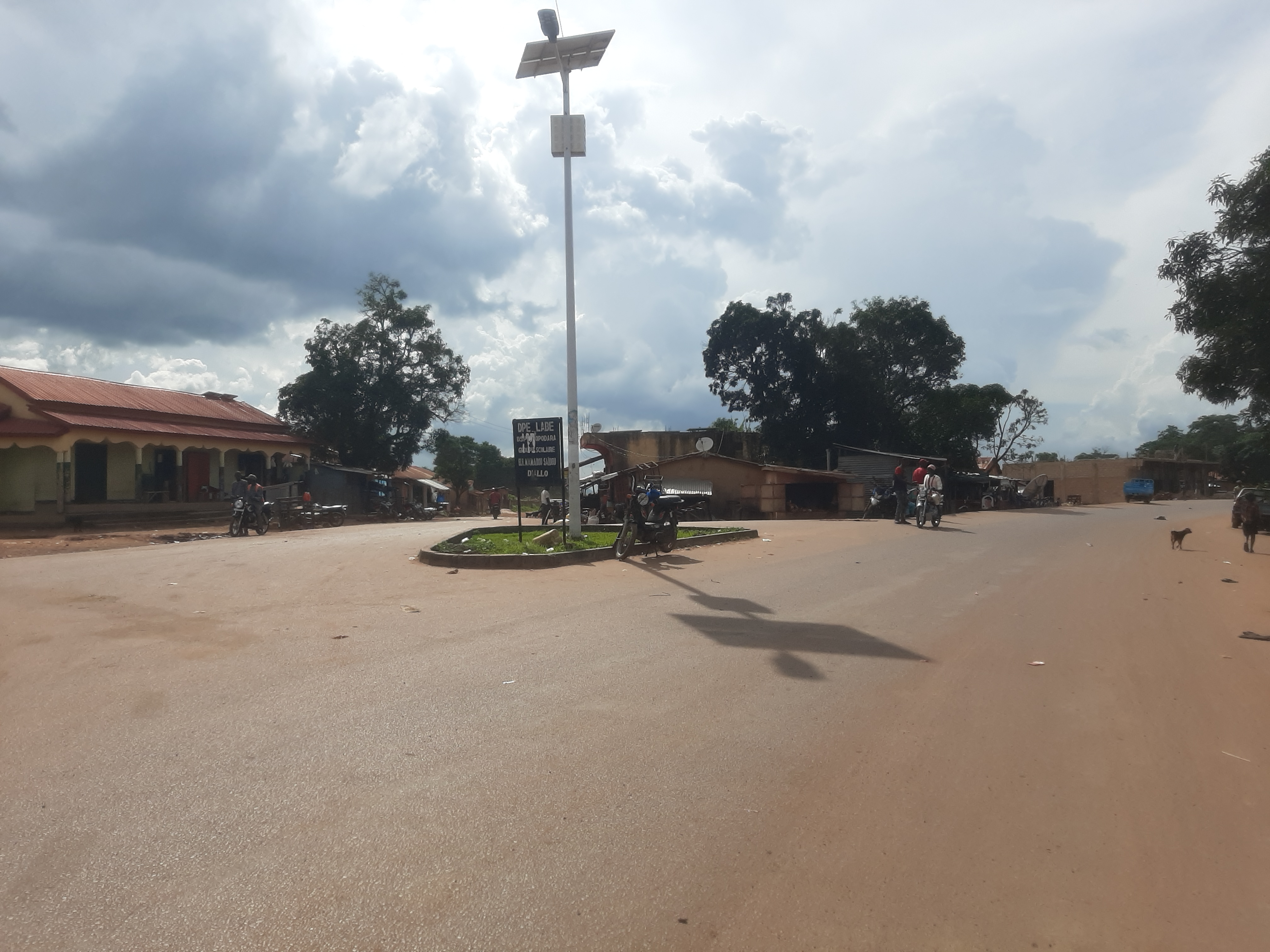

Popodara (Pular: 𞤂𞤫𞤧-𞤯𞤢𞤤𞤭𞥅𞤪𞤫 𞤆𞤮𞥅𞤨𞤮𞤣𞤢𞤪𞤢𞥄) is a town and sub-prefecture in the Labé Prefecture in the Labé Region of northern-central Guinea.
