= Kobela =

Kobela may refer to:

- Kobéla, town and sub-prefecture in Nzérékoré Prefecture, Nzérékoré Region, Guinea
- Kobela, Estonia, settlement in Antsla Parish, Võru County, Estonia
- Calleagris kobela, butterfly of the family Hesperiidae, also known as Mrs Raven flat and Mrs Raven skipper
