= Diari, Guinea =

Diari
- Sub-prefecture and town
- Location in Guinea
- Coordinates: 11°20′N 12°30′W
- Country: Guinea
- Region: Labé Region
- Prefecture: Labé Prefecture
- Time zone: UTC+0 (GMT)

Diari (Pular: 𞤂𞤫𞤧-𞤯𞤢𞤤𞤭𞥅𞤪𞤫 𞤔𞤢𞥄𞤪𞤭) is a town and sub-prefecture in the Labé Prefecture in the Labé Region of northern-central Guinea.
