= Daralabe =

- Sub-prefecture and town
- Location in Guinea
- Coordinates: 11°26′N 11°21′W
- Country: Guinea
- Region: Labé Region
- Prefecture: Labé Prefecture
- Time zone: UTC+0 (GMT)

Daralabe (Pular: 𞤂𞤫𞤧-𞤯𞤢𞤤𞤭𞥅𞤪𞤫 𞤁𞤢𞥄𞤪𞤢 𞤂𞤢𞤦𞤫) is a town and sub-prefecture in the Labé Prefecture in the Labé Region of northern-central Guinea.

It is situated between the sub-prefecture of Garambe, Hafia and Bantighel. It is divided into six Districts: Dara-Centre, Gaya, Madina N'Dire, Daraketchoun, Kouraba and Fello Bantang
