= Benda, Guinea =

Benda
- Village
- Location in Guinea
- Coordinates: 8°12′N 8°50′W
- Country: Guinea
- Region: Nzérékoré Region
- Prefecture: Nzérékoré Prefecture
- Time zone: UTC+0 (GMT)

Benda is a village in the Nzérékoré Prefecture in the Nzérékoré Region of south-eastern Guinea.
