= Hafia =

- Sub-prefecture and town
- Location in Guinea
- Coordinates: 11°13′N 12°24′W
- Country: Guinea
- Region: Labé Region
- Prefecture: Labé Prefecture
- Time zone: UTC+0 (GMT)

Hafia (Pular: 𞤂𞤫𞤧-𞤯𞤢𞤤𞤭𞥅𞤪𞤫 𞤢𞥄𞤬𞤭𞤴𞤢) is a town and sub-prefecture in the Labé Prefecture in the Labé Region of northern-central Guinea.
