= Moussadou =

- Sub-prefecture and town
- Location in Guinea
- Coordinates: 8°53′N 8°48′W
- Country: Guinea
- Region: Nzérékoré Region
- Prefecture: Beyla Prefecture

Population (2016)
  - Total: 16,725
- Time zone: UTC+0 (GMT)

Moussadou or Moussadougou (formerly Musardu) is a town and sub-prefecture in the Beyla Prefecture in the Nzérékoré Region of south-eastern Guinea.

== History ==
According to certain oral histories, Moussadougou was founded by Zomusa Musa who was soon reinforced by the Mandinka Kamara clan, likely in the 16th century. Other traditions from Bopolu, to the south, credit Fanggama or Feni Kamara with the foundation of the town and claim that one of his original companions Fili Mamu Dole succeeded him. By the 18th century it was an important trading and religious center on the southern boundary of the Mande sphere and the Mali Empire.

Kékorocissédou is one of the historical villages in sub-prefecture of Moussadou. It was established by Aboubacar Cissé, commonly known as Kékoro.
