= Samoé =

- Sub-prefecture and town
- Location in Guinea
- Coordinates: 7°48′19″N 8°52′3″W
- Country: Guinea
- Region: Nzérékoré Region
- Prefecture: Nzérékoré Prefecture
- Time zone: UTC+0 (GMT)

Samoé is a town and sub-prefecture in the Nzérékoré Prefecture in the Nzérékoré Region of Guinea.
