= Koumandou =

- Sub-prefecture
- Location in Guinea
- Coordinates: 9°10′N 8°0′W
- Country: Guinea
- Region: Nzérékoré Region
- Prefecture: Beyla Prefecture
- Time zone: UTC+0 (GMT)

Koumandou is a sub-prefecture in the Beyla Prefecture in the Nzérékoré Region of south-eastern Guinea. The main town is Koumandougou.
