= Bolodou =

- Sub-prefecture and town
- Location in Guinea
- Coordinates: 8°51′N 10°20′W
- Country: Guinea
- Region: Nzérékoré Region
- Prefecture: Guéckédou Prefecture

Government
  - Mayor: Aboubacar Faya Kamano

Population (2014)
  - Total: 13,643
- Time zone: UTC+0 (GMT)

Bolodou is a town and sub-prefecture in the Guéckédou Prefecture in the Nzérékoré Region of south-western Guinea. The sub-prefecture had a population of 13,643 in 2014, up from 11,750 in 1996. The town itself has 94 houses with an unknown population. The Bolodou Sub-Prefecture is divided into seven quarters (districts), which are Beddou, Bolodou Centre, Faindou, Gbandou, Koleadou, Kongoma and Soumtou. Each of these towns can further be split into sectors, which are the smallest administrative divisions in Guinea.

In 2017, Ibrahima Tounkara, a local mathematics teacher, set up his own dam to generate hydroelectric power for the town's homes. In December 2017, a 27 metres (89 ft) long bridge was built that connected the previously separate markets in Yèndè Millimou and Guéckédou.
