= Alaminata =

- Village
- Location in Guinea
- Coordinates: 8°11′N 8°40′W
- Country: Guinea
- Region: Nzérékoré Region
- Prefecture: Nzérékoré Prefecture
- Time zone: UTC+0 (GMT)

Alaminata is a village in the Nzérékoré Prefecture in the Nzérékoré Region of south-eastern Guinea.
