= Palé =

Sub-prefecture in Nzérékoré Region, Guinea

- Sub-prefecture and town
- Location in Guinea
- Coordinates: 8°02′N 8°54′W
- Country: Guinea
- Region: Nzérékoré Region
- Prefecture: Nzérékoré Prefecture
- Time zone: UTC+0 (GMT)

Palé is a town and sub-prefecture in the Nzérékoré Prefecture in the Nzérékoré Region of Guinea.
