= Djountou =

- Sub-prefecture and town
- Location in Guinea
- Coordinates: 11°28′N 12°32′W
- Country: Guinea
- Region: Labé Region
- Prefecture: Lélouma Prefecture
- Time zone: UTC+0 (GMT)

Djountou (or Diountou) is a town and sub-prefecture in the Lélouma Prefecture in the Labé Region of northern-central Guinea.
