= Womé =

Womé may refer to:

== People ==
- Dové Womé (born 1991), Togolese footballer
- Pierre Womé (born 1979), Cameroonian footballer

== Places ==
- Womey, Guinea (alternate spelling)
