= Lélouma =

- Sub-prefecture and town
- Location in Guinea
- Coordinates: 11°11′N 12°56′W
- Country: Guinea
- Region: Labe Region
- Prefecture: Lelouma Prefecture

Population (2008)
  - Total: 5,457

Lélouma (Pular: 𞤂𞤫𞥅𞤤𞤵𞤥𞤢𞥄) is a town located in west central Guinea. It is the capital of Lélouma Prefecture.

Population 5,457 (2008 est).
