= Diari =

Diari may refer to:

- The Soninke word for griot
- Diari, Guinea
