= Mount Loura =

Mountain in Guinea

Coordinates: 12.1123°N 12.2635°W

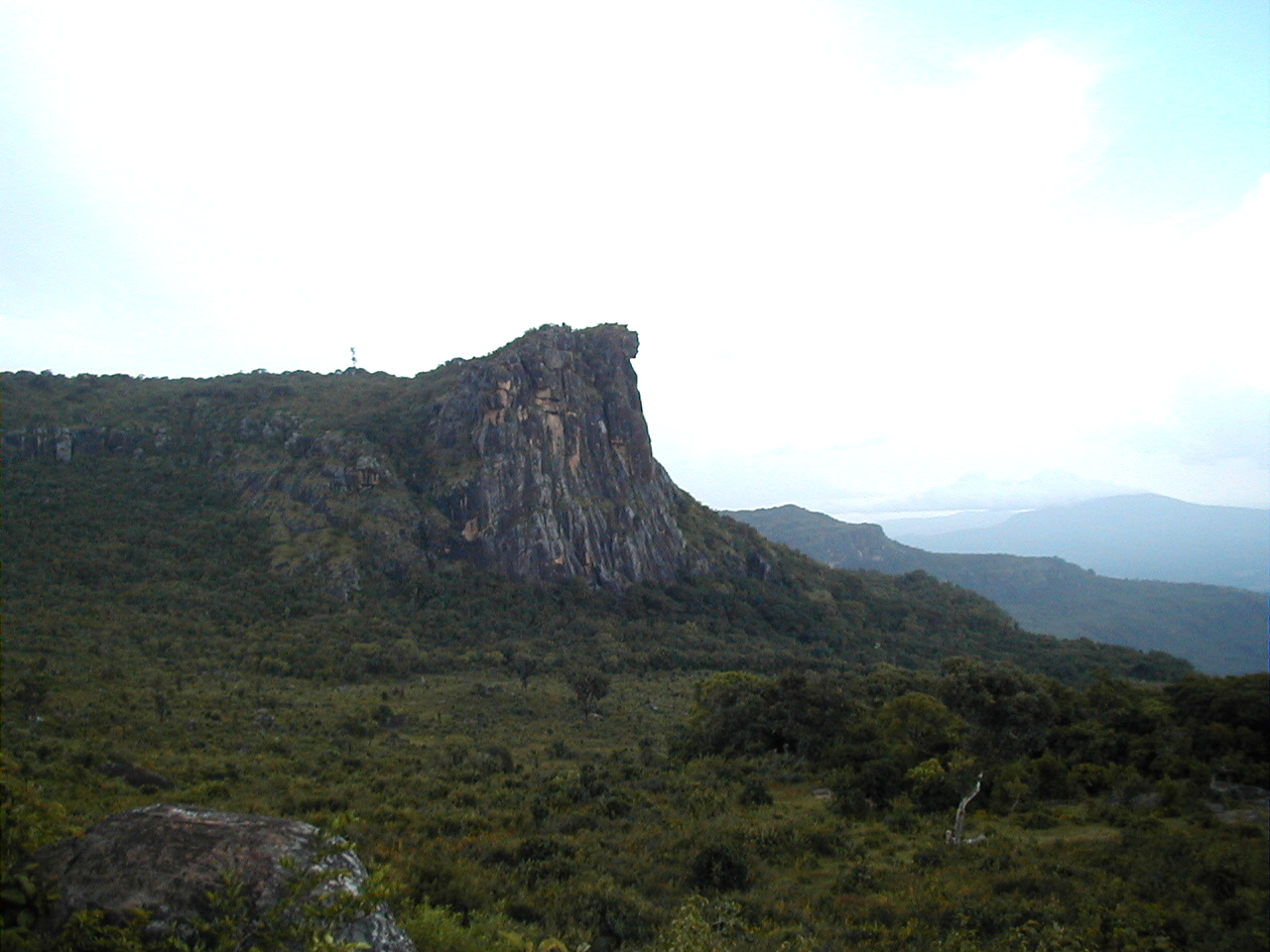
The "Dame de Mali".

Mount Loura (Fello Loura in the Pular language) is the northernmost point and highest peak at 1,573 metres (5,161 ft) in the Fouta Djallon in northern Guinea. It is 7 km from the prefecture of Mali-ville. It is part of a complex of mountains called the Massif de Tamgue, which rises to steep cliffs on three sides, and provides views into Senegal and Mali.
