= Mali, Guinea =

Mali
- Sub-prefecture and town
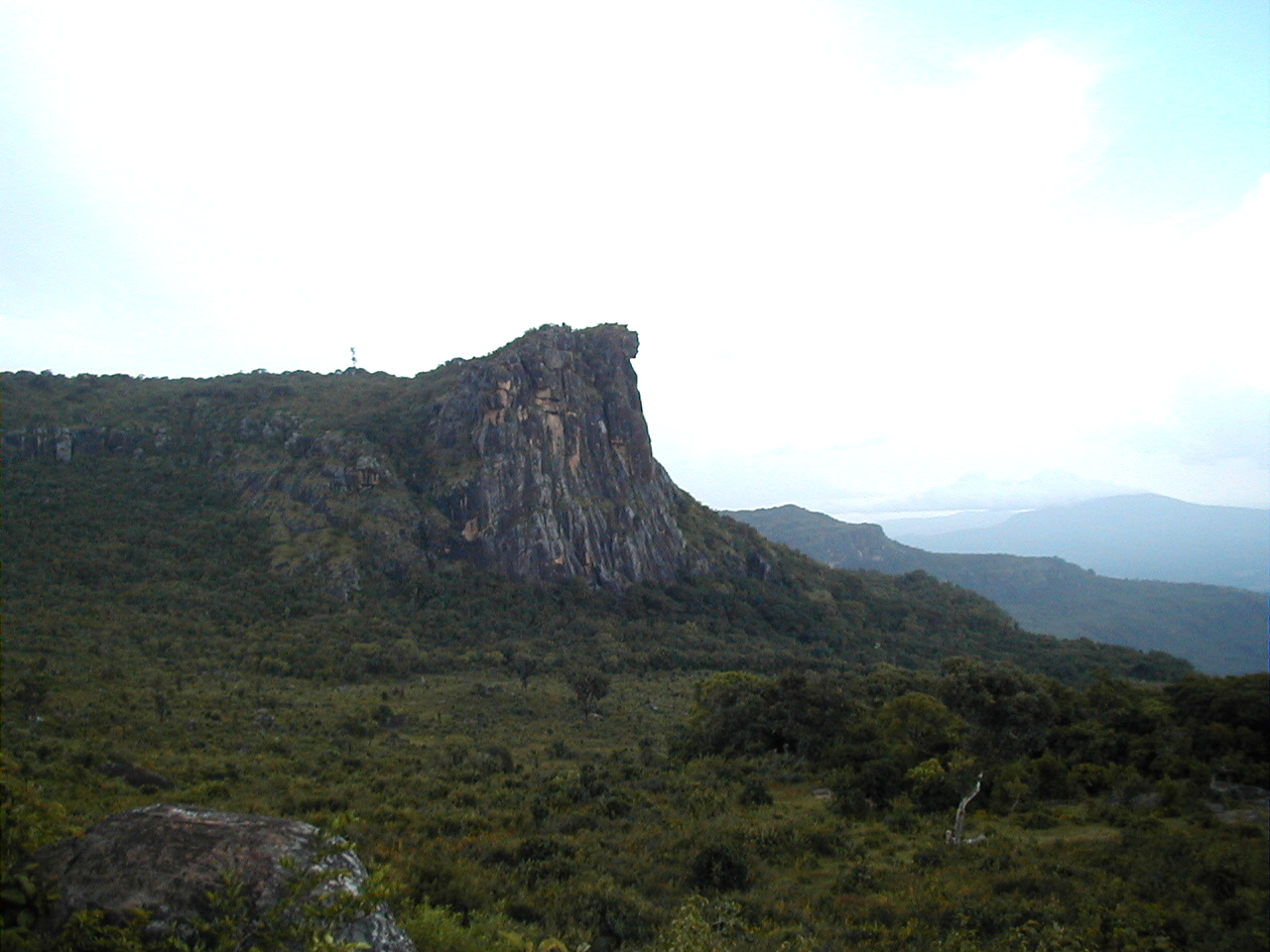
- Mount Loura

- Location in Guinea
- Coordinates: 12°5′N 12°18′W
- Country: Guinea
- Region: Labe Region
- Prefecture: Mali Prefecture

Population (2008)
  - Total: 4,798

Mali (Pular: 𞤃𞤢𞥄𞤤𞤭) is a town in northern Guinea on the edge of the Tamgué Massif. It is also commonly known as Maali Yemberen or Maali Labe to distinguish it from the country of Mali. Its population is around 4,798 (2008 est).

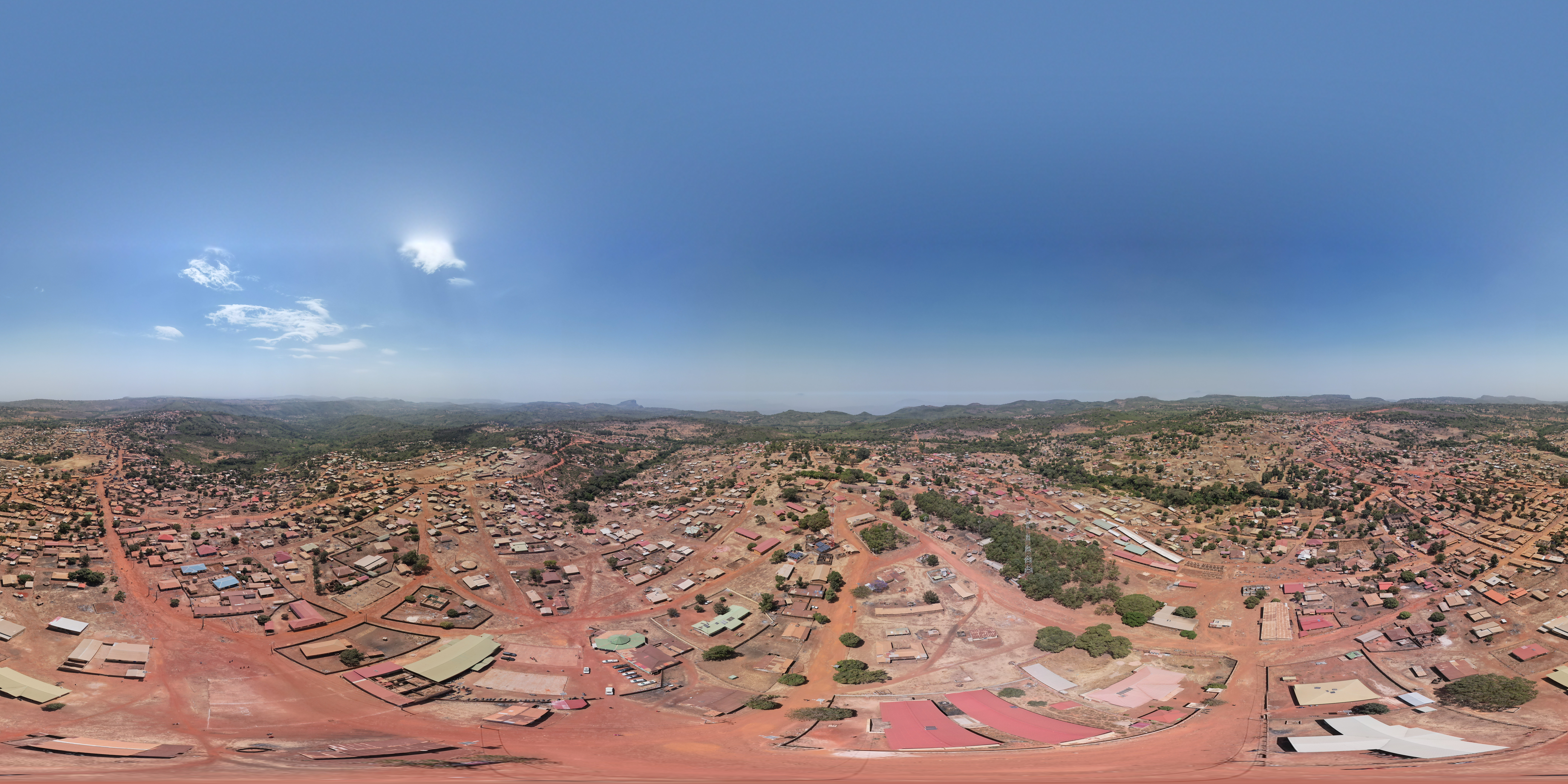
Mali

It is known as a market town and for its honey. Market day is Sunday. Mali lies near Mount Loura and Mount Lansa and is the highest town in Guinea at over 1300 metres.
