= Kobéla =

- Sub-prefecture and town
- Location in Guinea
- Coordinates: 7°53′N 9°1′W
- Country: Guinea
- Region: Nzérékoré Region
- Prefecture: Nzérékoré Prefecture
- Time zone: UTC+0 (GMT)

Kobéla is a town and sub-prefecture in the Nzérékoré Prefecture in the Nzérékoré Region of Guinea.
