= Banié =

- Sub-prefecture and town
- Location in Guinea
- Coordinates: 7°23′N 9°23′W
- Country: Guinea
- Region: Nzérékoré Region
- Prefecture: Yomou Prefecture
- Time zone: UTC+0 (GMT)

Banié is a town and sub-prefecture in the Yomou Prefecture in the Nzérékoré Region of south-eastern Guinea.
