= Nusi =

Nusi can refer to:

- Noussy, Guinea
- Nusi Island, also known as Tench Island, Papua New Guinea
- Nüsi mosques, Women's mosques in China

== People ==
- Nusi Somogyi (1884–1963), Hungarian film and stage actress
- Nuși Tulliu (1872–1941), Aromanian poet and prose writer
