= Erumakkadu =

Village in Pathanamthitta District, Kerala, India

Erumakkadu is the host karala (land) for Aranmula Uthrattadi Vallamkali. It is a small village in Pathanamthitta district of Central Travancore region (South Central Kerala) in Kerala state, South India.
