= University of Nzérékoré =

Public university in Guinea

- Université de Nzérékoré
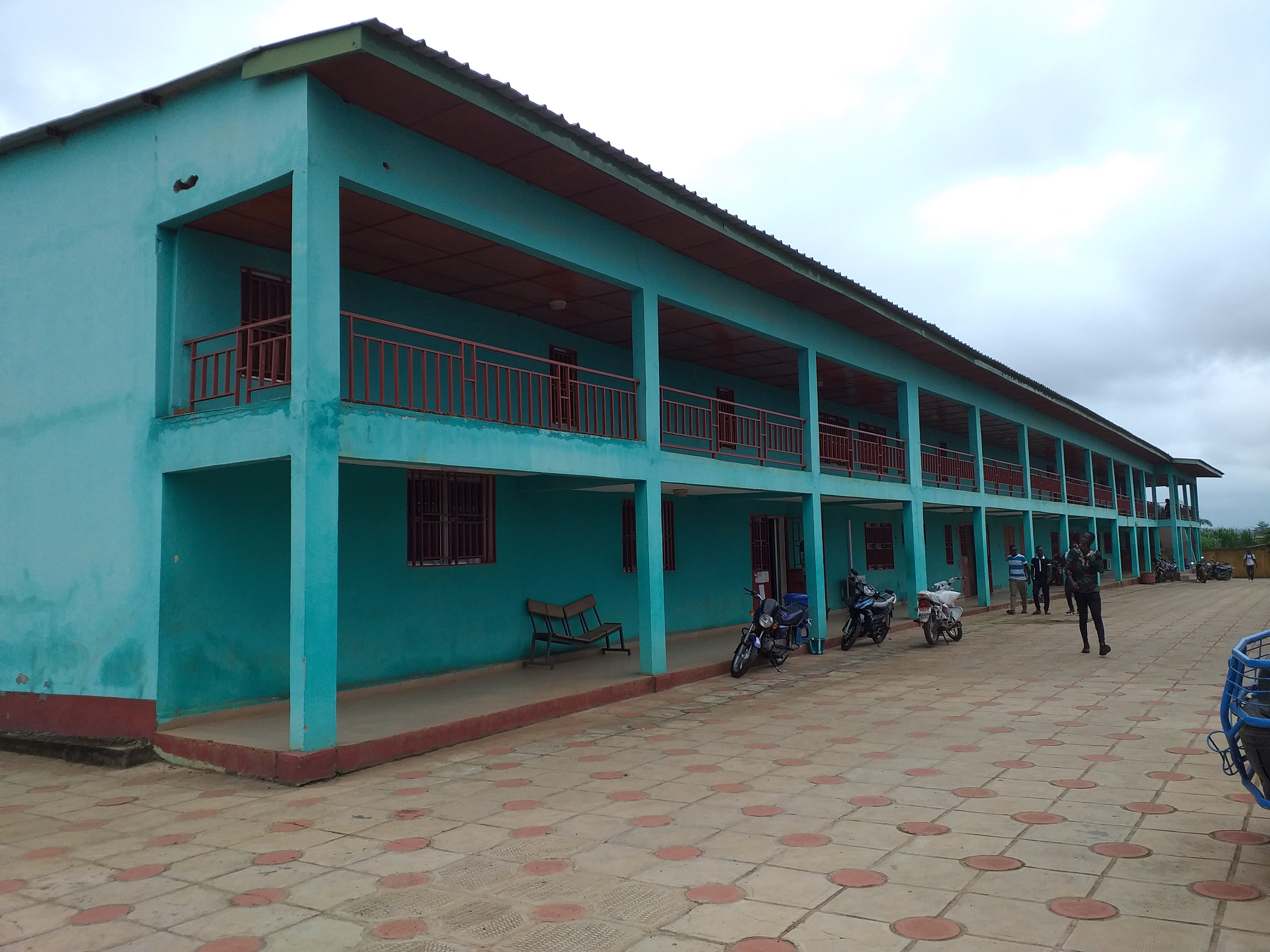
- Type: Public
- Affiliations: Gamal Abdel Nasser University of Conakry
- Rector: Dr. Oumar Keita
- Location: Nzérékoré, Guinea; 7.7328°N 8.8348°W
- Language: French
- Website: ent.univ-nzerekore.net

The University of Nzérékoré (UZ) is a public higher education institution in Guinea, located in Nzérékoré in the southeast of the country.

The university operates under the supervision of the Ministry of Higher Education and Scientific Research.

== History ==
The Nzérékoré University Center was established in 1998 and was renamed the University of Nzérékoré on September 5, 2001, by decree No. 3988/MESRS/CAB/DNE/UC/UK, along with the University of Labé.

Since its establishment, it has had several rectors:

List of Rectors
Name	Start date	End date
Dr. Ousmane Wora Diallo	October 21, 2016	October 2019
Dr. Oumar Keita	October 2019	Present

== Programs ==
The University of Nzérékoré currently comprises 2 faculties offering 8 programs of study:

- Faculty of Environmental Sciences:
  - Meteorology
  - Water Science (Hydrology)
  - Natural Resources
  - Environmental Engineering
- Faculty of Technological Sciences:
  - Biology
  - Physics
  - Chemistry
  - Mathematics

== See also ==
- University of Labé
- Gamal Abdel Nasser University of Conakry
