= Bahn =

Bahn may refer to:

- Banie, formerly named Bahn, a Polish village
- Deutsche Bahn, the national German railway company
- Paul Bahn, British archaeologist

== See also ==
- Banie (disambiguation)
