= Lélouma Prefecture =

Coordinates: 11.1833°N 12.9333°W

- Prefecture
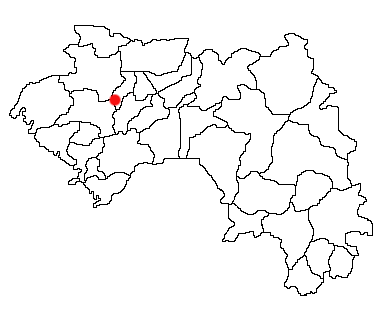
- Location of Lélouma Prefecture and seat in Guinea.
- Country: Guinea
- Region: Labé Region
- Capital: Lélouma

Area
  - Total: 2,140 km^{2} (830 sq mi)

Population (2014)
  - Total: 163 069
  - Density: 76/km^{2} (200/sq mi)
- Time zone: UTC+0 (Guinea Standard Time)

Lélouma (Pular: 𞤂𞤫𞥅𞤤𞤵𞤥𞤢𞥄) is a prefecture located in the Labé Region of Guinea. The capital is Lélouma. The prefecture covers an area of 2,140 km.² In census of 2014, it had population of 163,000.

== Sub-prefectures ==
The prefecture is divided administratively into 11 sub-prefectures:

1. Lélouma-Centre
2. Balaya
3. Djountou
4. Hérico
5. Korbé
6. Lafou
7. Linsan
8. Manda
9. Parawol
10. Sagalé
11. Tyanguel-Bori
