= Antoine Kadouno =

Guinean politician

Deputy in the National Assembly (Guinea), 2nd Vice-President of the Commission for Defense and Security
- President: Alpha Conde
- Preceded by: Joseph Gbaka Sandouno
- Constituency: Gueckedou

Personal details
- Party: Rally of the Guinean People

Antoine Kadouno is a Guinean politician who represents the constituency of Gueckedou, in the National Assembly (Guinea). He is a member of the Majority Rally of the Guinean People Party of former president Alpha Conde.

He is the representative of the Guéckédou region constituency in Forest Guinea at the National Assembly and second vice-president of the defense and security commission of Guinea's 9th legislature.
