= Samana, Guinea =

Samana
- Sub-prefecture and town
- Location in Guinea
- Coordinates: 9°7′N 8°34′W
- Country: Guinea
- Region: Nzérékoré Region
- Prefecture: Beyla Prefecture
- Time zone: UTC+0 (GMT)

Samana is a town and sub-prefecture in the Beyla Prefecture in the Nzérékoré Region of south-eastern Guinea.
