= Banie (disambiguation) =

Banie is a village in Poland.

Banie may also refer to:

- Banie (island), one of the Solomon Islands
- Banié, a town in Guinea
