= Guinean languages alphabet =

Old orthograpchal transcription for languages of Guinea

Following independence, the government of Guinea adopted rules of transcription for the languages of Guinea based on the characters and diacritic combinations available on typewriters of that period. This alphabet was used officially until 1989.

== Guinea language orthography ==
The Guinea alphabet made use of several digraphs (including either "h" or "y" as the second letter), some of which represent consonants not present in European languages, and two diacritics (grave accent and diaeresis) for open vowels.

This system was widely used within the country but differed from the orthographies of neighboring countries of West Africa, as developed in the wake of the 1966 Bamako expert meeting on harmonizing orthographies of the cross-border languages of the region.

In 1989, following a meeting on reform of the alphabet in 1988, it was decided to adopt an orthography similar to the African reference alphabet used elsewhere in the region.

A summary table of the digraphs and diacritics of the old alphabet, and their extended Latin equivalents in the new system, follows:

Pre-1989	Post-1989	Language(s)	IPA value
bh	ɓ	Pular	ɓ
dh	ɗ	Pular	ɗ
gh	ɠ	Pular	ɠ
kh	x	Susu	ɣ
nh	ŋ	Pular, Maninka	ŋ
ny	ɲ	Pular, Maninka, Susu	ɲ
yh	ƴ	Pular	/ˀj/
è	ɛ	Maninka, Susu	ɛ
ö	ɔ	Maninka, Susu	ɔ
dy	j	Pular, Maninka	dʒ
ty	c	Pular, Maninka	tʃ
