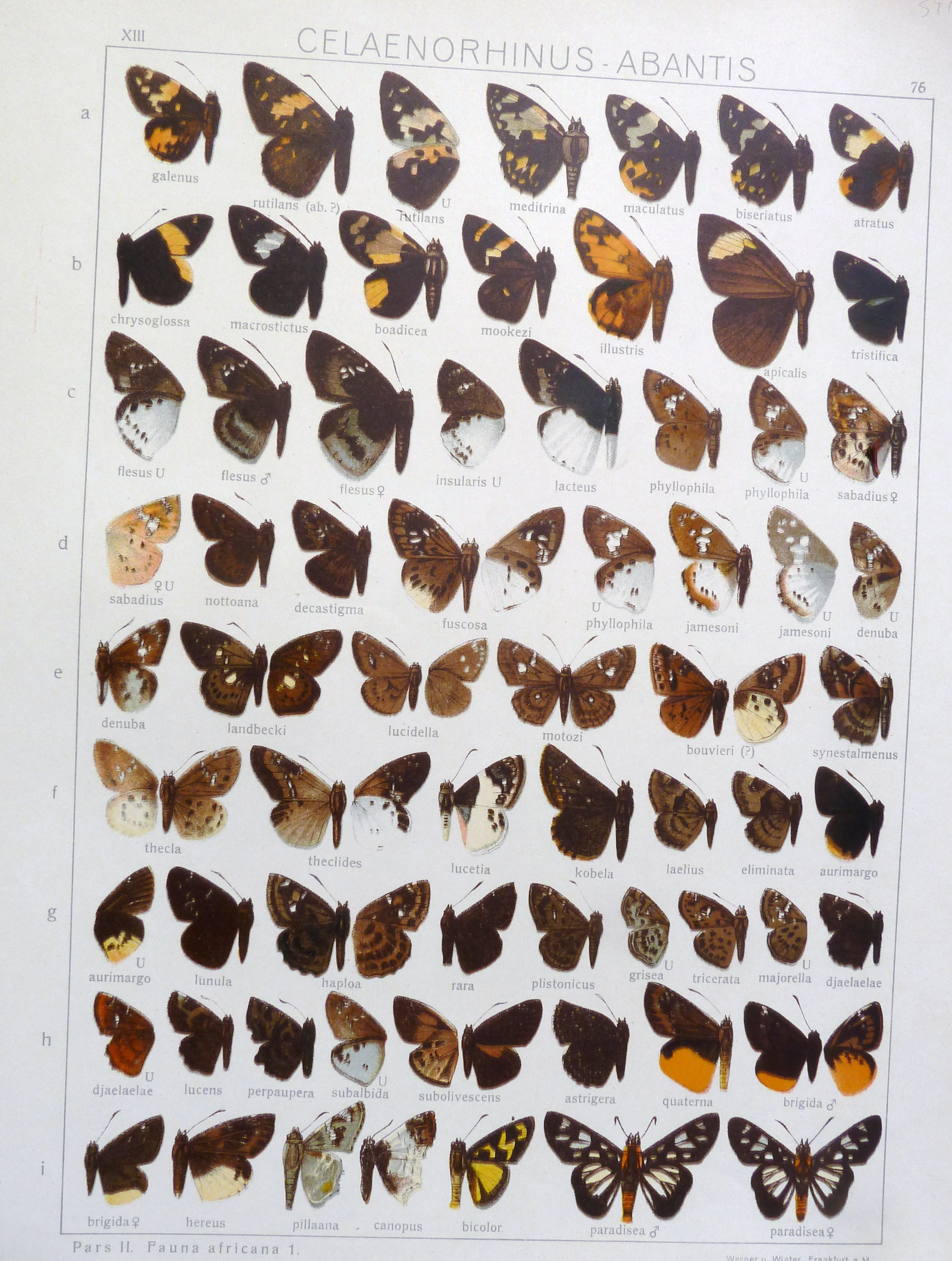

Scientific classification
- Kingdom: Animalia
- Phylum: Arthropoda
- Clade: Pancrustacea
- Class: Insecta
- Order: Lepidoptera
- Family: Hesperiidae
- Genus: Calleagris
- Species: C. lacteus

Binomial name
- Calleagris lacteus (Mabille, 1877)

Synonyms
- Tagiades lacteus Mabille, 1877; Tagiades dannatti Ehrmann, 1893

= Calleagris lacteus =

Milky scarce flat

Species of butterfly

Calleagris lacteus, the milky scarce flat, is a butterfly in the family Hesperiidae. It is found in Guinea, Sierra Leone, Liberia, Ivory Coast, Ghana, Nigeria, Cameroon, the Republic of the Congo, the Central African Republic, the Democratic Republic of the Congo, Uganda, Tanzania and Zambia. The habitat consists of wetter forests.

Adult males are attracted to bird droppings.

== Subspecies ==
- Calleagris lacteus lacteus (Nigeria: the Cross River loop, Cameroon, Congo, Central African Republic, Democratic Republic of Congo, Uganda, western Tanzania, north-western and north-eastern Zambia)
- Calleagris lacteus dannatti (Ehrmann, 1893) (Guinea, Sierra Leone, Liberia, Ivory Coast, Ghana, western Nigeria)
