= Immaculate Heart of Mary Cathedral, Nzérékoré =

Immaculate Heart of Mary Cathedral
- Cathédrale du Cœur Immaculé de Marie de Nzérékoré
- Immaculate Heart of Mary Cathedral
- 7.7518°N 8.8116°W
- Location: Nzérékoré
- Country: Guinea
- Denomination: Roman Catholic Church

The Immaculate Heart of Mary Cathedral (French: Cathédrale du Cœur Immaculé de Marie de Nzérékoré) or just Nzérékoré Cathedral, is a religious building of the Catholic Church which is located in Nzérékoré, the second largest city in the African country of Guinea.

The cathedral follows the Roman Catholic or Latin rite and serves as the seat of the diocese of Nzérékoré (Dioecesis Nzerekorensis) which was created in 1937 by Pope Pius XI by the Bull "Quo ex Evangelii".

It is under the pastoral responsibility of the Bishop Raphael Balla Guilavogui.

== See also ==
- Immaculate Heart of Mary Cathedral
- Roman Catholicism in Guinea
