= Yinde-Millinou =

- Location in Guinea
- Coordinates: 8°47′15″N 10°8′45″W
- Country: Guinea
- Region: Nzérékoré Region

Yinde-Millinou is a town in the Nzérékoré Region of Guinea.
