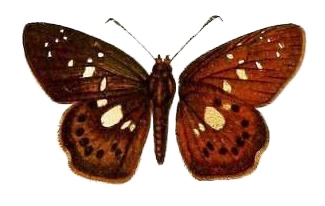
- female

Scientific classification
- Domain: Eukaryota
- Kingdom: Animalia
- Phylum: Arthropoda
- Class: Insecta
- Order: Lepidoptera
- Family: Hesperiidae
- Genus: Calleagris
- Species: C. landbecki

Binomial name
- Calleagris landbecki (H. H. Druce, 1910)

Synonyms
- Eagris landbecki H. H. Druce, 1910

= Calleagris landbecki =

Landbeck's scarce flat

Species of butterfly

Calleagris landbecki, or Landbeck's scarce flat, is a butterfly in the family Hesperiidae. The species was first described by Hamilton Herbert Druce in 1910. It is found in Sierra Leone, Ivory Coast, Nigeria (the Cross River loop), Cameroon, the Republic of the Congo, the Central African Republic and the Democratic Republic of the Congo. The habitat consists of primary wet forests.
