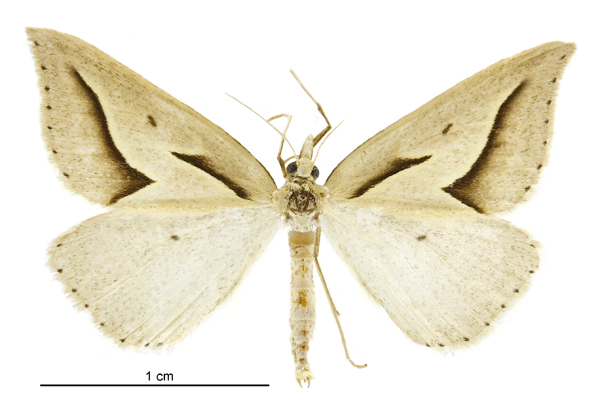
- Male

Conservation status
- Relict (NZ TCS)

Scientific classification
- Kingdom: Animalia
- Phylum: Arthropoda
- Clade: Pancrustacea
- Class: Insecta
- Order: Lepidoptera
- Family: Geometridae
- Genus: Samana
- Species: S. acutata

Binomial name
- Samana acutata Butler, 1877

= Samana acutata =

Species of moth

Samana acutata is a species of moth in the family Geometridae This species is endemic to New Zealand. It is classified as "At Risk, Relict" by the Department of Conservation.

== Taxonomy ==
This species was first described by Arthur Gardiner Butler in 1877 using a specimen that was collected from Christchurch, in the South Island and was obtained from J. D. Enys. George Hudson discussed this species in his 1898 book New Zealand moths and butterflies (Macro-lepidoptera). He later discussed and illustrated this species in his 1928 book The Butterflies and Moths of New Zealand. The holotype specimen is held at the Natural History Museum, London.

== Description ==
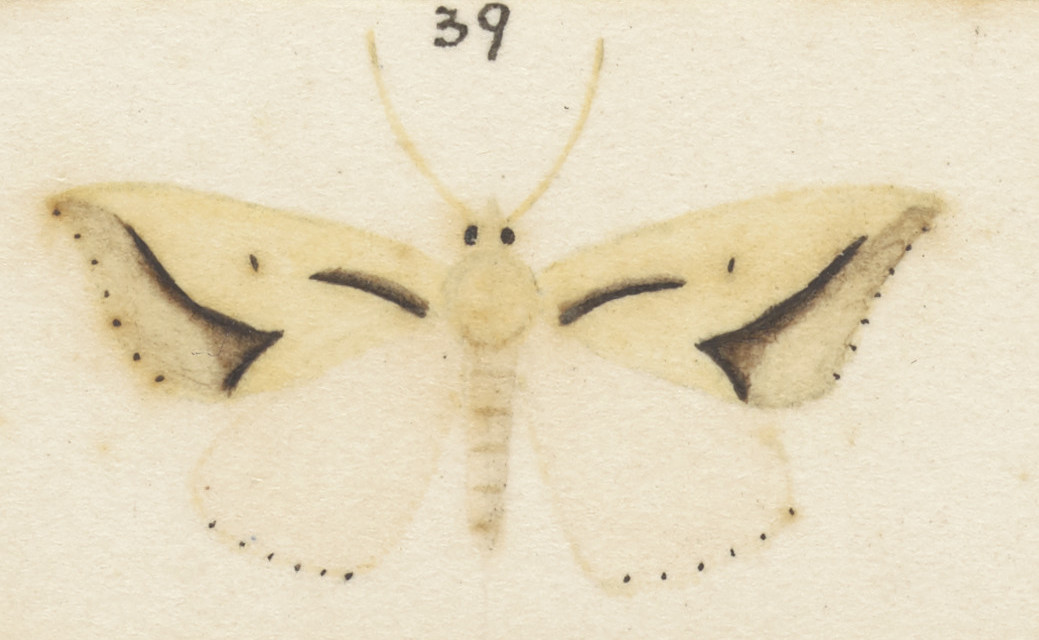
Illustration by George Hudson.

Butler described the species as follows:

Primaries pale straw yellow; an oblique interno-basal litura, a dot at the end of the cell, and a discal transverse line terminating in an acute < -shaped angle, piceous; the discal line diffused externally; a marginal series of black dots; secondaries white, with the fringe creamy; a marginal series of black dots; thorax pale straw yellow, abdomen white : primaries below pale testaceous, whitish on internal area; markings (excepting the marginal dots, which are united by a slender brown line) only visible through the wing; secondaries white, the costal area tinted with testaceous, and sparsely irrorated with brown; a small black dot at the end of cell; a marginal series of black dots; fringe creamy : body below pale straw yellow. Expanse of wings 1 inch 2 lines.

== Distribution ==
This species is endemic to New Zealand. S. acutata can be found in Mid Canterbury and Central Otago. It is now extinct at its type locality.

== Life cycle and behaviour ==
Larvae of this species have been found in January and in March. The adult is on the wing in September and October. Hudson stated this species is attracted to light.

== Host species and habitat ==
The host species for this moth are the New Zealand native brooms in the genus Carmichaelia including Carmichaelia australis and Carmichaelia appressa. The species is known to inhabit dune ecosystems. It has also been found in habitat containing gorse and mānuka.

== Conservation status ==
This moth is classified under the New Zealand Threat Classification system as being "At Risk, Relict". This species is threatened as a result of change of habitat, in particular the loss of its host species due to farming and urban development. It is also at risk from weed invasion from plants such as sea spurge.
