= Beyla, Guinea =

Beyla
- Sub-prefecture and town
- Location in Guinea
- Coordinates: 8°41′N 8°38′W
- Country: Guinea
- Region: Nzérékoré
- Prefecture: Beyla
- Elevation: 2,477 ft (755 m)

Population (2008 est.)
  - Total: 13,204

Beyla (N’ko: ߓߋߟߊ߫) is a town and urban sub-prefecture located in south eastern Guinea. It is the capital of the Beyla prefecture of the Nzérékoré Region of Guinea.

The population estimate as of 2008 was 13,204.

== Mining ==
Dyula merchants established the settlement in the early 1200s as a hub for gathering slaves and kola nuts. Nowadays, it serves as the primary commercial hub for rice, livestock, tobacco, coffee, palm oil, and palm kernels.

Beyla is the main town serving the Simandou iron ore project. The mine is operated by a British-Australian mining corporation Rio Tinto. Its presence in Beyla has lasted approximately 17 years. Rio Tinto has also invested about $700 million USD towards the Guinean government for the purpose of exploring and likely prospecting of the mountain.
