= Guéckédou =

- Sub-prefecture and town
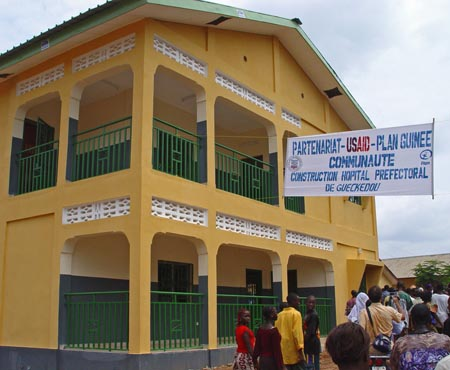
- Guéckédou hospital

- Location in Guinea
- Coordinates: 8°34′N 10°08′W
- Country: Guinea
- Region: Nzérékoré Region
- Prefecture: Guéckédou Prefecture

Population (2008)
  - Total: 221,715

Guéckédou or Guékédou is a town in southern Guinea near the Sierra Leone and Liberian borders. It had a population of 79,140 (as of the 1996 census) but has grown in the 21st century due to refugees fleeing the Second Liberian Civil War and the Sierra Leone Civil War.

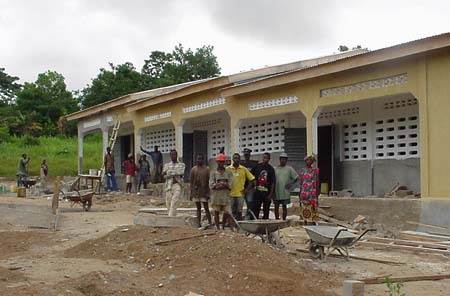
A school in Guéckédou

The city is renowned for its large weekly market, which attracts traders from across Southern Guinea, Sierra Leone, Liberia and Côte d'Ivoire.

On February 12, 2007, the town's police station was ransacked amidst the resumption of protests and strikes against President Lansana Conté.

In 2014, volunteers organized by Guéckédou's Red Cross worked in sanitation, disinfection, and monitoring efforts to help contain the 2014 West Africa Ebola outbreak. Some reported they were "encountering resistance in some villages such as Bafassa, Wassaya and Tolebengo in Guéckédou Prefecture, where rumours help fuel the flames of fear ... A main focus of the interventions involves deploying volunteers to communities to raise awareness on how to prevent the spread of the disease and, in the process, address the fear and stigma gripping many communities." The World Health Organization estimated cumulative totals of 227 cases and 173 deaths occurred in Guéckédou as of June 22, 2014. Eleven patients were in Ebola Virus Disease (EVD) Treatment Centres in Guéckédou as of that date, and 527 contacts were being followed up on as part of a mandatory 21-day observation period.

== Hospitals ==
- Hôpital Central de Guéckédou
- Hôpital Préfectoral de Guéckédou
- Poste de Santé Sokoro
- Poste de Santé de Vao
- Poste de Santé de Farako
