= Calleagris hollandi =

Scientific classification
- Kingdom: Animalia
- Phylum: Arthropoda
- Class: Insecta
- Order: Lepidoptera
- Family: Hesperiidae
- Genus: Calleagris
- Species: C. hollandi

Binomial name
- Calleagris hollandi (Butler, 1897)

Synonyms
- Sarangesa hollandi Butler, 1897

Species of butterfly

Calleagris hollandi is a butterfly in the family Hesperiidae. It is found in Uganda, western Tanzania, Angola, the Democratic Republic of the Congo (Shaba), northern Zambia and northern Malawi. Its habitat consists of moist woodland.
