= Calleagris jamesoni =

Scientific classification
- Domain: Eukaryota
- Kingdom: Animalia
- Phylum: Arthropoda
- Class: Insecta
- Order: Lepidoptera
- Family: Hesperiidae
- Genus: Calleagris
- Species: C. jamesoni

Binomial name
- Calleagris jamesoni (Sharpe, 1890)

Synonyms
- Antigonus jamesoni Sharpe, 1890; Eagris jamesoni ab. kigonserensis Wichgraf, 1921; Calleagris jamesoni f. gava Evans, 1937; Calleagris jamesoni neavei Evans, 1951

Species of butterfly

Calleagris jamesoni, Jameson's flat or Jameson's skipper, is a butterfly in the family Hesperiidae. It is found in Angola, the Democratic Republic of the Congo, Tanzania, Zambia, Malawi, Mozambique, Zimbabwe and Botswana. Their habitat consists of Brachystegia woodland, savanna and forest margins.

Adults are on wing year round. There are fairly distinct seasonal forms.

The larvae feed on Mnondo (Julbernardia globiflora) and Machabel (Brachystegia boehmii) foliage.

== Subspecies ==
- Calleagris jamesoni jamesoni (Democratic Republic of Congo: Shaba, eastern Tanzania, Zambia, Malawi, Mozambique, eastern Zimbabwe, Botswana)
- Calleagris jamesoni ansorgei Evans, 1951 (Angola)
- Calleagris jamesoni jacksoni Evans, 1951 (western and northern Tanzania)
