= Calleagris krooni =

Scientific classification
- Kingdom: Animalia
- Phylum: Arthropoda
- Class: Insecta
- Order: Lepidoptera
- Family: Hesperiidae
- Genus: Calleagris
- Species: C. krooni

Binomial name
- Calleagris krooni Vári, 1974

Species of butterfly

Calleagris krooni, Kroon's flat or Kroon's skipper, is a butterfly of the family Hesperiidae. It is found in South Africa, it is only known from Afromontane forests of Mpumalanga.

The wingspan is 43–45 mm (1.7–1.8 in) for males and 47–51 mm (1.9–2.0 in) for females. There is one generation in late summer with peaks from February to April.
