= Nzérékoré Prefecture =

Nzérékoré Prefecture ߒߛߙߍߜߍ߬ߘߍ߫ ߡߙߊ߬ߓߊ߰ߘߊ߮
- Prefecture
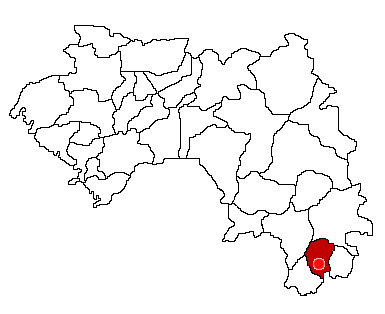
- Location of Nzérékoré Prefecture and seat in Guinea.
- Coordinates: 7.7500°N 8.8167°W
- Country: Guinea
- Region: Nzérékoré Region
- Capital: Nzérékoré

Area
  - Total: 3,632 km^{2} (1,402 sq mi)

Population (2014 census)
  - Total: 396,949
  - Density: 109.3/km^{2} (283.1/sq mi)
- Time zone: UTC+0 (Guinea Standard Time)
- ISO 3166 code: GN-NZ

Nzérékoré is a prefecture located in the Nzérékoré Region of Guinea. The capital is Nzérékoré. The prefecture covers an area of 3,632 square kilometres (1,402 sq mi) and has an estimated population of 396,949.

== Sub-prefectures ==
The prefecture is divided administratively into 11 sub-prefectures:

1. Nzérékoré-Centre
2. Bounouma
3. Gouécké
4. Kobéla
5. Koropara
6. Koulé
7. Palé
8. Samoé
9. Soulouta
10. Womey
11. Yalenzou

== Towns and villages ==
- Alaminata
- Balimou
- Bamba
- Bana
- Bangoueta
- Bassaita
- Batoata
- Beliehouma
- Benda
- Beneouli
- Bienta
- Bilikoidougou
- Bipa
- Bohon
- Boita
- Boma
- Boo
- Bounouma
- Bowe
- Dapore
- Demou
- Din
- Diogouinta
- Diomanta
- Dorota
- Douala
- Dourouba
- Foudjou
- Gala
- Galagbaye
- Galeye
- Gambata
- Gbadiou
- Gbaeta
- Gbagoune
- Gbaya
- Gbili
- Gbonoma
- Gbote
- Gbouo
- Gobouta
- Gonon
- Gota
- Gou
- Goueke
- Gounangalay
- Gpagalai
- Guela
- Guelabodiou
- Hoota
- Kabieta
- Kankore
- Karagouala
- Karana
- Kelema
- Kelemadiou
- Keora
- Keoulenta
- Kerediala
- Kleita
- Koaliepoulou
- Kodeda
- Kogbata
- Kogoloue
- Kola
- Kolagbata
- Kolata
- Koliouata
- Koloda
- Komata
- Komou
- Koni
- Konia
- Konian
- Konigpala
- Koro
- Kotodzou
- Kouenala
- Koule
- Lokooua
- Lomou
- Louhoule
- Loula
- Loule
- Mabossou
- Mana
- Mananko
- Meata
- Moata
- Ngnin
- Niambala
- Niaragbaleye
- Niaragpale
- Niema
- Ninata
- Nionta
- Noona
- Nzao
- Orata
- Oueya
- Ouinzou
- Pineta
- Poe
- Pouro
- Samoe
- Saouro
- Sehipa
- Selo
- Sibamou
- Sopota
- Souhoule
- Soulouta
- Yalenzou
- Yeneta
- Yleouena
- Yogbota
- Yomou
- Youa
- Zapa
- Zenemouta
- Zohoyea
