= Labé Prefecture =

Coordinates: 11°19′05″N 12°17′10″W

- Prefecture
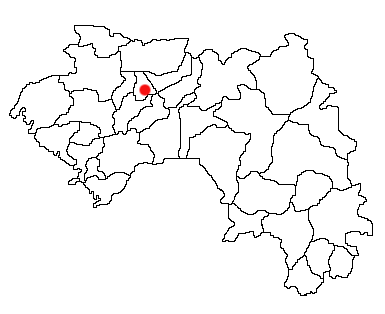
- Location of Labé Prefecture and seat in Guinea.
- Country: Guinea
- Region: Labé Region
- Capital: Labé

Area
  - Total: 3,014 km^{2} (1,164 sq mi)

Population
  - Total: 204,000
  - Density: 67.7/km^{2} (175/sq mi)
- Time zone: UTC+0 (Guinea Standard Time)

Labé (Pular: 𞤍𞤢𞤤𞤭𞥅𞤪𞤫 𞤂𞤢𞤦𞤫) is a prefecture in the Labé Region of Guinea. The capital is Labé. The prefecture covers an area of 3,014 km² and has an estimated population of 204,000.

== Sub-prefectures ==
The prefecture is divided administratively into 13 sub-prefectures:

1. Labé-Centre
2. Dalein
3. Daralabe
4. Diari
5. Dionfo
6. Garambé
7. Hafia
8. Kaalan
9. Kouramangui
10. Noussy
11. Popodara
12. Sannou
13. Tountouroun
14. Tarambaly
