= Womey =

Sub-prefecture and town in Nzérékoré Region, Guinea

- Sub-prefecture and town
- Location in Guinea
- Coordinates: 8.078°N 8.782°W
- Country: Guinea
- Region: Nzérékoré Region
- Prefecture: Nzérékoré Prefecture
- Time zone: UTC+0 (GMT)

Womey (or Womé or Ouomé) is a town and sub-prefecture in the Nzérékoré Prefecture in the Nzérékoré Region of Guinea.

The sub-prefecture is 494 km^{2} in area and has a population of 13,196 (2014 census).

== Incident on 16 September 2014 ==
On 16 September 2014, a local Guinean government team arrived in Womey to educate the population about ebola. They were set upon by local people, and later the bodies of eight of them were found in a public latrine pit.

== See also ==
- Ebola virus epidemic in Guinea
