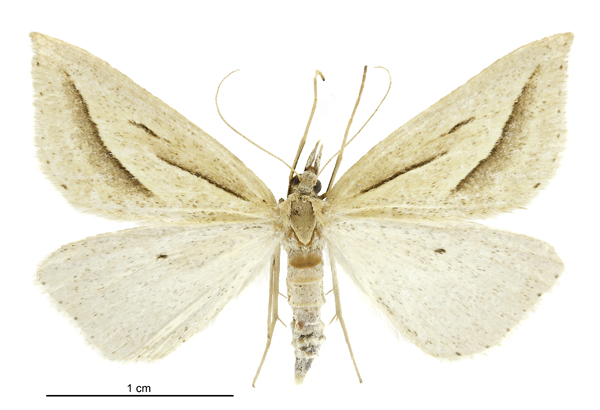
- Female
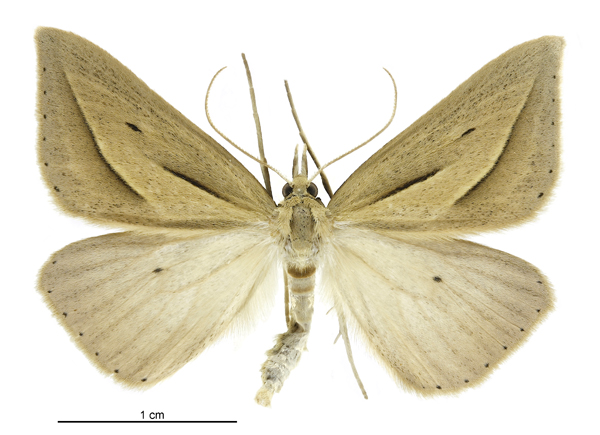
- Male

Scientific classification
- Kingdom: Animalia
- Phylum: Arthropoda
- Class: Insecta
- Order: Lepidoptera
- Family: Geometridae
- Genus: Samana
- Species: S. falcatella

Binomial name
- Samana falcatella Walker, 1863

= Samana falcatella =

Species of moth endemic to New Zealand

Samana falcatella is a species of moth in the family Geometridae. This species is endemic to New Zealand.
