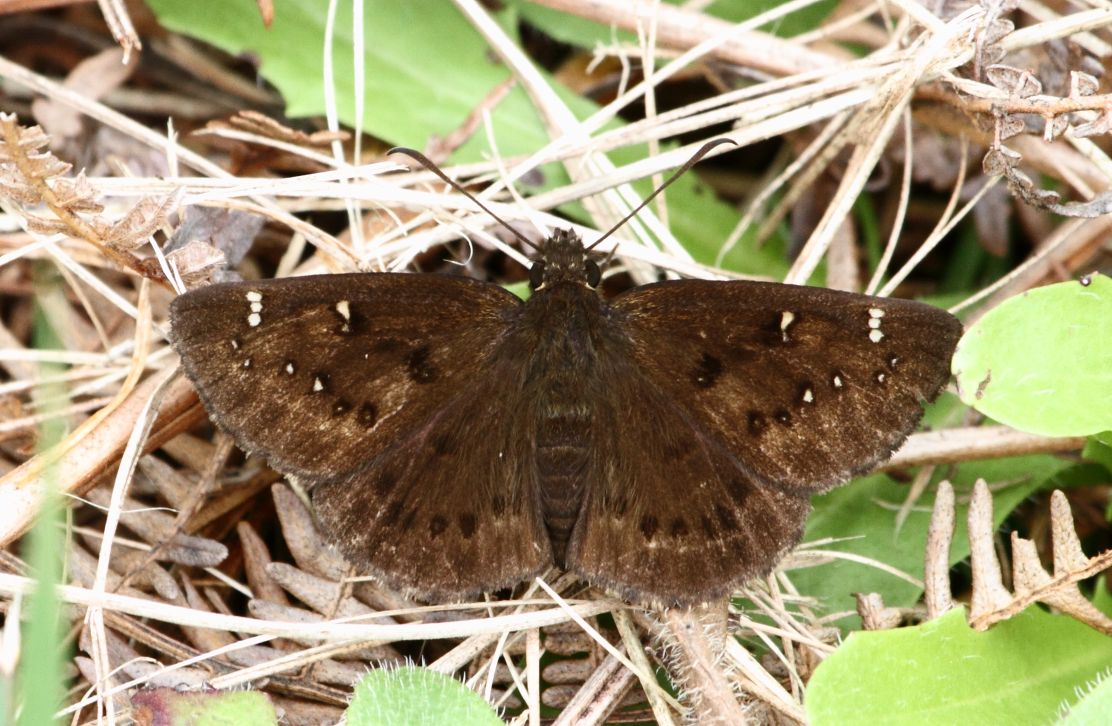
- Calleagris kobela

Scientific classification
- Kingdom: Animalia
- Phylum: Arthropoda
- Class: Insecta
- Order: Lepidoptera
- Family: Hesperiidae
- Tribe: Tagiadini
- Genus: Calleagris; Aurivillius, [1925]

= Calleagris =

Genus of butterflies

Calleagris is a genus of skippers in the family Hesperiidae.

== Species ==
- Calleagris hollandi (Butler, 1897)
- Calleagris jamesoni (Sharpe, 1890)
- Calleagris kobela (Trimen, 1864)
- Calleagris krooni Vári, 1974
- Calleagris lacteus (Mabille, 1877)
- Calleagris landbecki (Druce, 1910)
