= Yomou Prefecture =

Coordinates: 7.5661°N 9.2533°W

- Prefecture
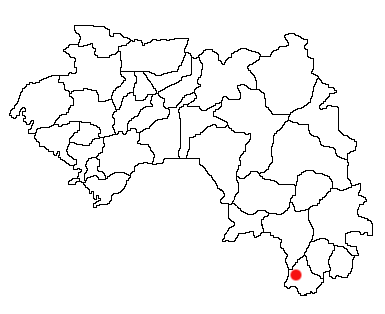
- Location of Yomou Prefecture and seat in Guinea.
- Country: Guinea
- Region: Nzérékoré Region
- Capital: Yomou

Area
  - Total: 3,920 km^{2} (1,510 sq mi)

Population (2014 census)
  - Total: 114,371
  - Density: 29.2/km^{2} (75.6/sq mi)
- Time zone: UTC+0 (Guinea Standard Time)

Yomou is a prefecture located in the Nzérékoré Region of Guinea. The capital and principal town of the prefecture is Yomou. The prefecture covers an area of 3,920 km.² and has an estimated population of 114,371.

As of 2005, Yomou town is estimated to have a population of around 12,000. The town is an important trading centre for the Guinea Highlands area.

== Sub-prefectures ==
The prefecture is divided administratively into 7 sub-prefectures:

1. Yomou-Centre
2. Banié
3. Bheeta
4. Bignamou
5. Bowé
6. Djécké
7. Péla
