= Samana (moth) =

Scientific classification
- Kingdom: Animalia
- Phylum: Arthropoda
- Class: Insecta
- Order: Lepidoptera
- Family: Geometridae
- Subfamily: Oenochrominae
- Genus: Samana; Walker, 1863

Genus of moths

Samana is a genus of moths in the family Geometridae erected by Francis Walker in 1863.

== Species ==
- Samana acutata Butler, 1877
- Samana falcatella Walker, 1863
