= Guéckédou Prefecture =

Coordinates: 8.5667°N 10.1333°W

- Prefecture
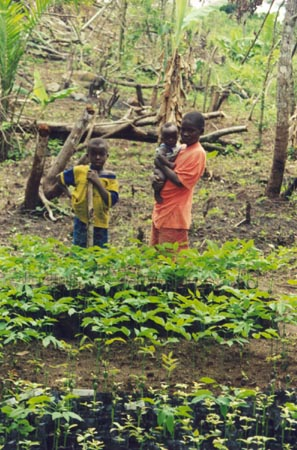

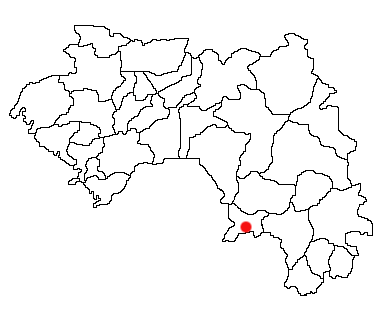
- Location of Guéckédou Prefecture and seat in Guinea.
- Country: Guinea
- Region: Nzérékoré Region
- Capital: Guéckédou

Area
  - Total: 4,750 km^{2} (1,830 sq mi)

Population (2014 census)
  - Total: 290,611
  - Density: 61.2/km^{2} (158/sq mi)
- Time zone: UTC+0 (Guinea Standard Time)

Guéckédou is a prefecture located in the Nzérékoré Region of Guinea. The capital is Guéckédou. The prefecture covers an area of 4,750 km.² and has a population of 290,611.

== Sub-prefectures ==
The prefecture is divided administratively into 10 sub-prefectures:

1. Guéckédou-Centre
2. Bolodou
3. Fangamadou
4. Guendembou
5. Kassadou
6. Koundou
7. Nongoa
8. Ouéndé-Kénéma
9. Tekoulo
10. Termessadou-Dibo

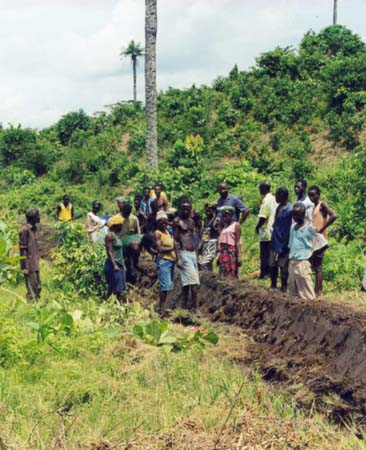
Irrigation in the prefecture

== See also ==
- Yinde-Millinou
