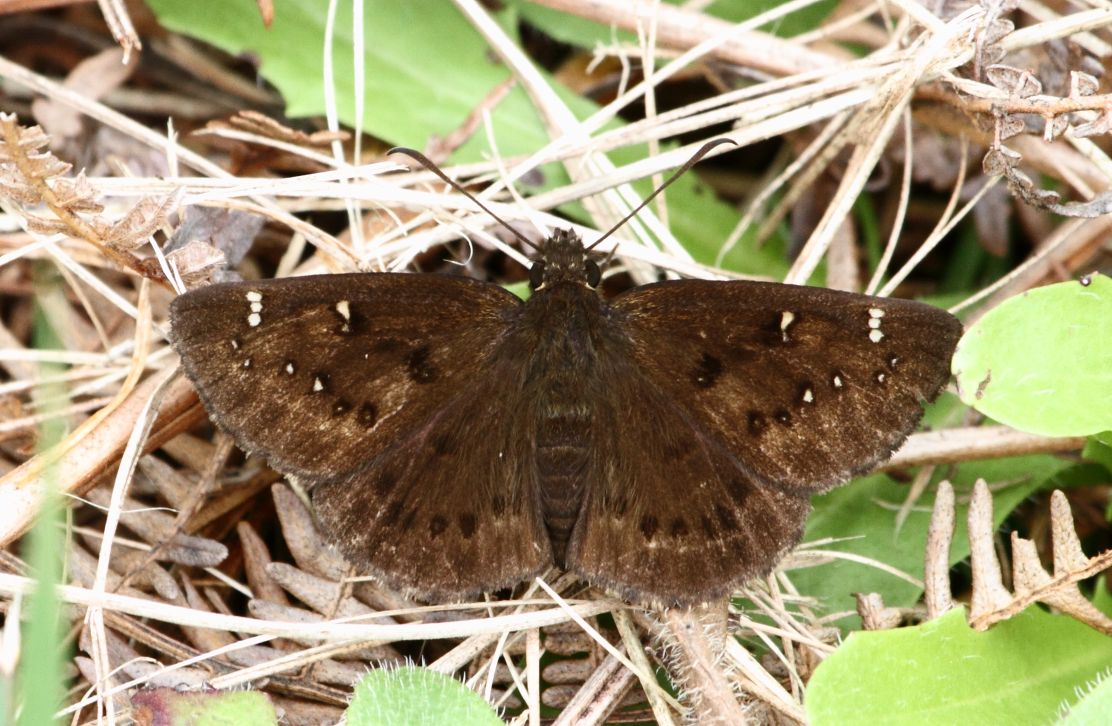

Scientific classification
- Domain: Eukaryota
- Kingdom: Animalia
- Phylum: Arthropoda
- Class: Insecta
- Order: Lepidoptera
- Family: Hesperiidae
- Genus: Calleagris
- Species: C. kobela

Binomial name
- Calleagris kobela (Trimen, 1864)

Synonyms
- Nisoniades kobela Trimen, 1864

= Calleagris kobela =

Species of butterfly

Calleagris kobela, the Mrs Raven's flat or Mrs Raven's skipper, is a butterfly of the family Hesperiidae. It is found in South Africa, in Afromontane forests from the eastern Cape along the Amatolas and coastal forests to KwaZulu-Natal up to the midlands.

The wingspan is 42–44 mm for males and 43–45 mm for females. There is one generation in late summer with peaks from February to March.
