= Yomou =

- Location in Guinea
- Coordinates: 7°33′57.60″N 9°15′11.88″W
- Country: Guinea
- Region: Nzérékoré Region
- Prefecture: Yomou Prefecture

Population (2008)
  - Total: 29,138

Yomou (N’ko: ߦߏ߭ߡߎ߲߬) is a town located in southeastern Guinea. It is the capital of Yomou Prefecture. It has an estimated population of 29,138 (2008) growing from 9,661 (1996).

The town is inhabited mainly by the Guerze (Kpelle) and Mano (or Manon) peoples. The surrounding area borders Liberia to the east.

A number of refugees crossed the border to Yomou during the First and Second Liberian Civil Wars, accounting for its recent growth.
