= Beyla Prefecture =

Coordinates: 8°41′12″N 8°39′28″W

- Prefecture
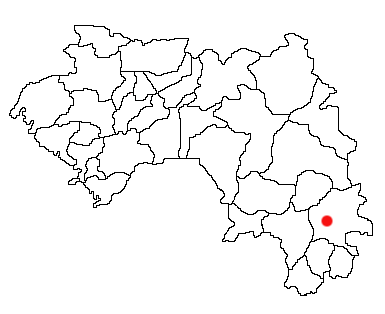
- Location of Beyla Prefecture and seat in Guinea.
- Country: Guinea
- Region: Nzérékoré Region
- Capital: Beyla

Area
  - Total: 13,612 km^{2} (5,256 sq mi)

Population (2014 census)
  - Total: 326,082
  - Density: 23.955/km^{2} (62.044/sq mi)
- Time zone: UTC+0 (Guinea Standard Time)

Beyla is a prefecture located in the Nzérékoré Region of Guinea. The capital is Beyla. The prefecture covers an area of 13,612 km.² and has an estimated population of 326,082.

== Sub-prefectures ==
The prefecture is divided administratively into 14 sub-prefectures:

1. Beyla-Centre
2. Boola
3. Diara-Guerela
4. Diassodou
5. Fouala
6. Gbakedou
7. Gbessoba
8. Karala
9. Koumandou
10. Moussadou
11. Nionsomoridou
12. Samana
13. Sinko
14. Sokourala
