= Nzérékoré =

Nzérékoré ߒߛߙߍߜߘߺߍ߬ , 𞤟𞤫𞤪𞤫𞤳𞤮𞤪𞤫
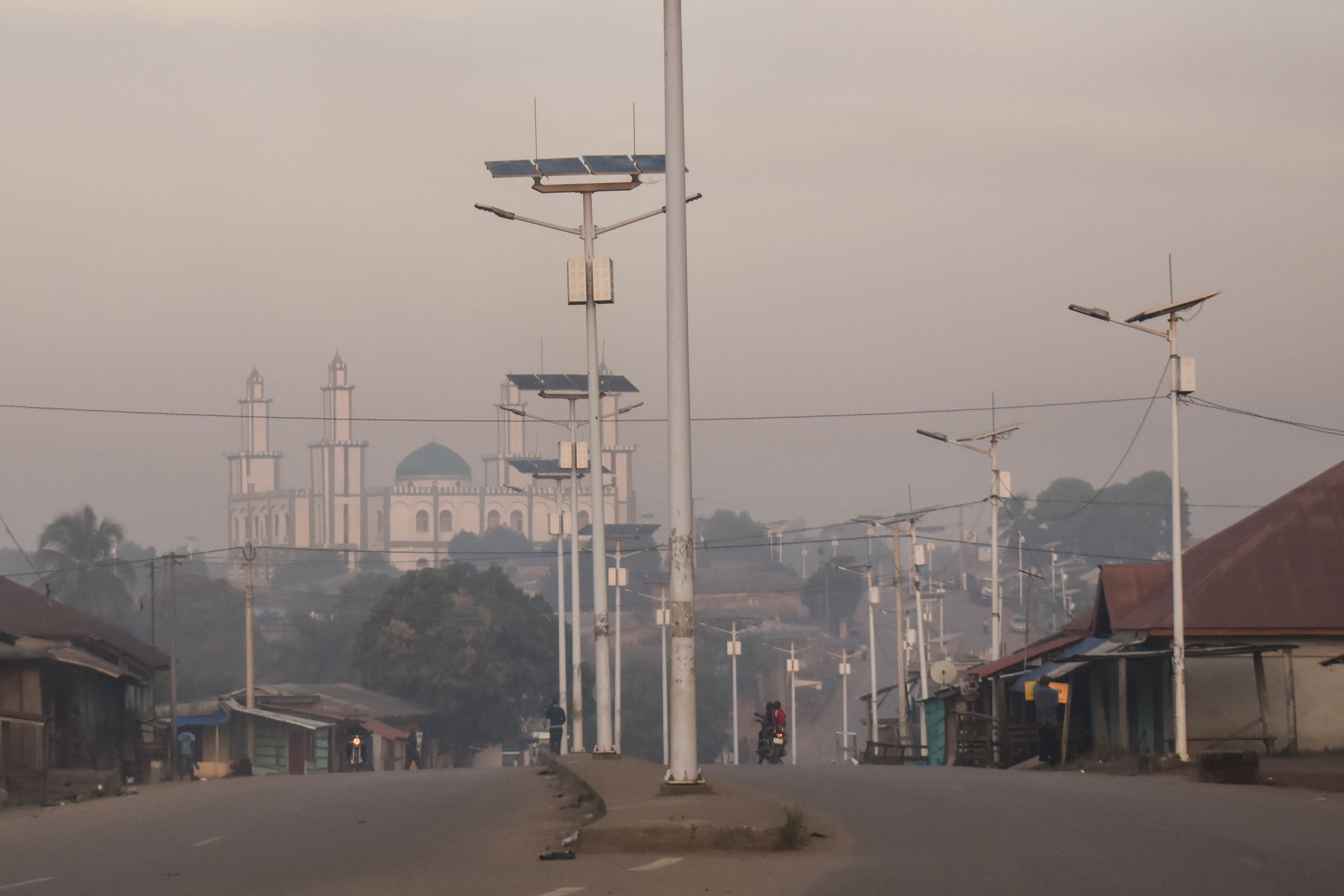

- Location within Guinea
- Coordinates: 7°45′08″N 8°49′18″W
- Country: Guinea
- Region: Nzérékoré Region
- Prefecture: Nzérékoré Prefecture

Population (July 2025)
  - Total: 316,065

Nzérékoré (N’ko: ߒߛߙߍߜߘߺߍ߬, Adlam: 𞤟𞤫𞤪𞤫𞤳𞤮𞤪𞤫; also spelled N'Zérékoré) is the third largest city in Guinea by population after the capital, Conakry and Kankan, and the largest city in the Guinée forestière region of southeastern Guinea. The city is the capital of Nzérékoré Prefecture. Nzérékoré is a commercial and economic center and lies approximately 354 mi (570 km) southeast of Conakry.

It was the centre of an uprising against French rule in 1911 and is now known as a market town and for its silversmithing. The population number lied between ~110,000 and ~290,000 in 1996 based on the Census, and is growing significantly since the start of civil wars in the neighboring Liberia, Sierra Leone, and Ivory Coast sparking inward migration, with the current population number lying between ~230,000 and ~400,000.

== History ==
Nzérékoré was the center of an uprising against French rule in 1911. From 1911–1912, the majority of the Nzérékoré Region was put under direct military rule.

There were three days of ethno-religious fighting in Nzérékoré in July 2013. Fighting between ethnic Guerzé (Kpelle), who are Christian or animist, and ethnic Konianke, who are Muslims and close to the larger Malinké ethnic group, left at least 54 dead. The dead included people who were killed with machetes and burned alive. The violence ended after the Guinean military imposed a curfew, and President Alpha Condé made a televised appeal for calm.

On 1 December 2024, Nzérékoré football stadium was the scene of violent clashes and a stampede that caused at least 56 deaths. After a disputed refereeing decision fans started to throw stones, triggering panic, after which the police joined in, firing tear gas. In the rush and scramble for the single stadium exit that followed, people fell to the ground and many, including children were trampled underfoot.

== Climate ==
Nzérékoré has a tropical savanna climate (Köppen climate classification Aw). The city features a lengthy wet season covering the months of March through November, while the remaining three months form the city's dry season. While average daily temperatures remain relatively consistent throughout the course of the year, Nzérékoré has a much higher diurnal temperature variation during its dry season with average highs around 33 °C or 91.4 °F and average lows ranging from 10 to 13 °C or 50.0 to 55.4 °F. The city averages roughly 1,800 mm or 70 in of precipitation annually.

Climate data for Nzérékoré (1991–2020)
Month	Jan	Feb	Mar	Apr	May	Jun	Jul	Aug	Sep	Oct	Nov	Dec	Year
Mean daily maximum °C (°F)	32.1 (89.8)	33.3 (91.9)	32.6 (90.7)	31.4 (88.5)	30.7 (87.3)	29.3 (84.7)	27.8 (82.0)	27.8 (82.0)	29.0 (84.2)	29.8 (85.6)	30.5 (86.9)	31.1 (88.0)	30.4 (86.7)
Daily mean °C (°F)	24.7 (76.5)	26.5 (79.7)	26.9 (80.4)	26.6 (79.9)	26.2 (79.2)	25.3 (77.5)	24.4 (75.9)	24.4 (75.9)	25.0 (77.0)	25.2 (77.4)	25.5 (77.9)	24.8 (76.6)	25.5 (77.9)
Mean daily minimum °C (°F)	17.3 (63.1)	19.7 (67.5)	21.3 (70.3)	21.7 (71.1)	21.7 (71.1)	21.3 (70.3)	21.0 (69.8)	21.0 (69.8)	21.1 (70.0)	20.7 (69.3)	20.5 (68.9)	18.4 (65.1)	20.5 (68.9)
Average precipitation mm (inches)	14.2 (0.56)	51.4 (2.02)	120.7 (4.75)	147.3 (5.80)	187.0 (7.36)	214.9 (8.46)	235.5 (9.27)	321.9 (12.67)	316.8 (12.47)	194.5 (7.66)	73.0 (2.87)	18.8 (0.74)	1,896 (74.65)
Average precipitation days (≥ 1.0 mm)	1.3	3.8	9.2	11.0	14.5	14.9	17.1	22.1	21.6	16.5	7.7	1.7	141.4
Average relative humidity (%)	65	68	72	76	79	81	84	85	82	80	79	73	77
Source: NOAA (humidity 1961–1990)

== Transportation ==
The N1 highway connects the city with Kankan in the north. The city is also served by Nzérékoré Airport.

== Places of worship ==
- Cathédrale du Cœur Immaculé de Marie de Nzérékoré

== Hospitals ==
- Hôpital régional de Nzérékoré
- Poste de Santé de Nyen 2

== See also ==
- Massacre at Womey
- Immaculate Heart of Mary Cathedral, Nzérékoré
- Forest Guinea
