= Pular language =

Senegambian language spoken in West Africa

Pular
- Pular بُۛلَر 𞤆𞤵𞤤𞤢𞤪; Pular Fuuta Jalon بُۛلَر ࢻُوتَ جَلࣾو 𞤆𞤵𞤤𞤢𞤪 𞤊𞤵𞥅𞤼𞤢 𞤔𞤢𞤤𞤮𞥅
- Native to: Guinea, Guinea-Bissau, Sierra Leone, Mali
- Region: Fouta Djallon, Guinea
- Ethnicity: Fula
- Native speakers: (9.8 million cited 2000–2022)
- Language family: Niger–Congo?: Atlantic–Congo; Senegambian; Fula–Wolof; Fula; West Central; Pular
- Writing system: Fula alphabets (Adlam, Ajami, Latin)

Language codes
- ISO 639-3: fuf
- Glottolog: pula1262

Ibrahima, a speaker of Pular from Guinea

A Pular and French speaker from Labé

Pular (𞤆𞤵𞤤𞤢𞤪), also referred to as Pula Futa, is a Fula language spoken primarily by the Fula people of Fouta Djallon, Guinea. It is also spoken in Guinea-Bissau, Gambia, Senegal and in parts of Sierra Leone. There are a small number of speakers in Mali. Pular is spoken by 9.3 million Guineans, about 55% of the national population. This makes Pular the most widely spoken indigenous language in the country. Substantial numbers of Pular speakers have migrated to other countries in West Africa, notably Senegal and Ivory Coast.

Pular is not to be confused with Pulaar, another Fula language spoken natively in Guinea, Senegal, Mauritania, and western Mali (including the Futa Tooro region).

Pular is written in three alphabets: Adlam script, Ajami script and the Latin script.

== Linguistic features ==
There are some particularities to this version of Fula, including:

- Use of plural form for politeness (such as in German or French, unlike other varieties of Fula)
- A number of separate verbal roots for politeness (these may exist only in Pular)
- There is no initial consonant mutation from singular to plural verb forms as is the case in other varieties of Fula (there is in nominal forms, however)
- In addition to the more standard long-form pronouns of Fula there are alternate forms in Pular (= hi(l) + pronoun). The table below summarizes these:

Person / number	Standard long-form pronoun (as in Pulaar)	Corresponding form in Pular
1st / sing	miɗo	miɗo hilan (non-standard alternate form)
2nd / sing	aɗa	hiɗa
3rd / sing	omo	himo
1st /pl (excl)	miɗen, amin	meɗen himen (non-standard alternate form)
1st / pl (incl)	eɗen	hiɗen
2nd / pl	oɗon	hiɗon
3rd / pl	eɓe	hiɓe

== Writing ==
Like other varieties of the Fula language, Pular was written before colonization in an Arabic-based orthography called Ajami. Today, Ajami remains prevalent in rural areas of Fouta Djallon, but Pular is mainly written in a Latin-based orthography, the so-called UNESCO orthography and the Adlam script, an indigenous alphabet created at the end of the 1980s by two brothers for the Fula language. Adlam have widely spread over the years in over 20 countries.

Up until 1989, Pular in Guinea was written with the Guinean languages alphabet that differed from that used in other countries.

=== Latin Alphabet ===
Pular Latin alphabet
A a	B b	Ɓ ɓ	C c	D d	Ɗ ɗ	E e	F f	G g	Ɠ ɠ	H h	I i	J j	K k	L l	M m
[a]	[b]	[ɓ]	[t͡ʃ]	[d]	[ɗ]	[e]	[f]	[g]	[q]	[h]	[i]	[d͡ʒ]	[k]	[l]	[m]
N n	Nb nb	Nd nd	Ng ng	Nj nj	Ñ ñ	Ŋ ŋ	O o	P p	R r	S s	T t	U u	W w	Y y	Ƴ ƴ
[n]	[ᵐb]	[ⁿd]	[ᵑɡ]	[ᶮd͡ʒ]	[ɲ]	[ŋ]	[o]	[p]	[r]	[s]	[t]	[u]	[w]	[j]	[jˤ]

=== Pre-1989 Latin Alphabet ===
Pre-1989 Pular Latin alphabet
A a	B b	Bh bh	D d	Dh dh	Dy dy	E e	F f	G g	Gh gh	H h	I i	J j	K k	L l	M m	Mb mb
[a]	[b]	[ɓ]	[d]	[ɗ]	[d͡ʒ]	[e]	[f]	[g]	[q]	[h]	[i]	[ʒ]	[k]	[l]	[m]	[ᵐb]
N n	Nd nd	Ndy ndy	Ng ng	Nh nh	Ny ny	O o	P p	R r	S s	T t	Ty ty	U u	W w	Y y	Yh yh	
[n]	[ⁿd]	[ᶮd͡ʒ]	[ᵑɡ]	[ŋ]	[ɲ]	[o]	[p]	[r]	[s]	[t]	[t͡ʃ]	[u]	[w]	[j]	[jˤ]	

=== Pular Ajami Alphabet ===
Despite decades of official endorsement and preference granted to the Latin Alphabet, Pular Ajami writing still remains widespread in every segment of Fuuta Jalon society. The study and literacy in Pular Ajami still forms an important part of Fula-speaking children's formative years.

But despite its widespread and historic usage, the Pular Ajami script remains basic and without standardization, although consistently in the Maghrebi script. The alphabet does not contain any additional letters to represent consonant phonemes that don't exist in Arabic. A single Arabic letter can correspond to multiple Latin letters and digraphs. Some authors do use small dots and markings to denote a different pronunciation. For example, in a Pular text, one may see the letter ba with three small dots 'ݑ' to indicate a [ɓ] or [p] pronunciation instead of a [b] pronunciation.

Unlike consonants, there are no variations in writing of vowels, and there does exist a universally accepted convention for them in Pular Ajami. While Arabic has 3 basic vowels, Pular has 5. Vowels [a], [i], and [u] are written with the three Arabic diacritics, whereas vowel [e] is written with the Quranic notation commonly found in books of Warsh tradition, which is a 'dot below' diacritic, and vowel [o] is written with 'damma' ([u]) with a dot on top. Vowels at the beginning of syllables are written not with alif or hamza as is common in Arabic, but with ‘ayin. Vowel lengthening is done with a succeeding alif for [aː], a succeeding yaa for [eː] and [iː], and succeeding waawu for [oː] and [uː].

Pular Ajami alphabet
Arabic (Latin) [IPA]	ا ‌( - / ’ / Aa aa ) [∅]/[ʔ]/[aː]	ب ‌(B b) [b]	ݑ ‌(Ɓ ɓ / P p) [ɓ]/[p]	ت ‌(T t) [t]	ث ‌(S s) [s]	ج ‌(C c / J j) [t͡ʃ]/[d͡ʒ]
Arabic (Latin) [IPA]	جۛ ‌(Ñ ñ / Ƴ ƴ) [ɲ]/[jˤ]	ح ‌(H h) [h]	خ ‌(K k) [k]([x])	د ‌(D d / Nd nd) [d]/[ⁿd]	ذ ‌(J j) [d͡ʒ]	ر (R r) [r]
Arabic (Latin) [IPA]	ز ‌(J j) [d͡ʒ]	س ‌(S s) [s]	ش ‌(S s) [s]	ص ‌(S s) [s]	ض ‌(L l) [l]	ط ‌(Ɗ ɗ) [ɗ]
Arabic (Latin) [IPA]	ظ ‌(J j) [d͡ʒ]	ع ‌(- / ’ ) [ʔ]	غ ‌(Kh kh) [ɡ]	ࢻـ ࢻ ‌(F f) [f]	ࢼـ ࢼ ‌(G g / Ɠ ɠ) [g]/[q]	ࢼۛـ ࢼۛ ‌(Ng ng) [ᵑɡ]
Arabic (Latin) [IPA]	ک ‌(K k) [k]	ل ‌(L l) [l]	م ‌(M m) [m]	ࢽـ ࢽ ‌(N n) [n]	ࢽْ ‌(Ŋ ŋ) [ŋ]	ࢽۛب ‌(Nb nb) [ᵐb]
Arabic (Latin) [IPA]	ࢽۛج ‌(Nj nj) [ᶮd͡ʒ]	ه ‌(H h) [h]	و ‌(W w / Oo oo / Uu uu) [w]/[oː]/[uː]	ي ‌(Y y / Ee ee / Ii ii) [j]/[eː]/[iː]	ء ‌( ’ ) [ʔ]	

Vowel at the beginning of a word
A	E	I	O	U
Short Vowels
عَـ / عَ	عٜـ / عٜ	عِـ / عِ	عࣾـ / عࣾ	عُـ / عُ
Long Vowels
Aa	Ee	Ii	Oo	Uu
عَا	عٜيـ / عٜي	عِيـ / عِي	عࣾو	عُو

Vowel at the middle or end of a word
a	e	i	o	u	∅
Short Vowels
◌َ	◌ٜ	◌ِ	◌ࣾ	◌ُ	◌ْ
Long Vowels
aa	ee	ii	oo	uu	
◌َا / ـَا	◌ٜيـ / ـٜيـ ◌ٜي / ـٜي	◌ِيـ / ـِيـ ◌ِي / ـِي	◌ࣾو / ـࣾو	◌ُو / ـُو	

== Sample Text ==
Below is a short segment of a larger poetry, called "the Mine of Happiness" (Oogirde Malal, عࣾوࢼِرْدٜ مَلَلْ, 𞤌𞥅𞤺𞤭𞤪𞤣𞤫 𞤃𞤢𞤤𞤢𞤤).

English Translation

O listener, listen to the words of the little man,
the humble subject, the weak, if you want Happiness;

The child of the humble Sa'iidu Muhammadu,
of the Seele lineage, from the land of Fuuta,

From the village of Mombeya, Lash'arî
of School and Malekite of Way

I will thank my Master without interruption.
May he bless the Prophet filled with excellence.

Latin Script

Yaa joom-nanugol, heɗo haala gorel,
jiyangel, lo'ungel, si a faala malal;

Iwngel e Sa'iidu-Muhammaduwel,
Seelenke leɲol, Fuutanke laral,

Mommbenke hoɗannde e Lash'ariyanke
to Kaɓɓe e Maalikiyanke Ɗatal.

Miɗo yettira Joomam rewnindiral.
Yo O juul e Nulaaɗo yeɗaaɗo ɓural.

Ajami Script

يَاجࣾمْ نَنُࢼࣾلْ، هٜطࣾ حَالَ ࢼࣾرٜل،
جِيَࢼٜۛلْ، ضࣾعُࢼٜۛلْ، سِعَ ࢻَالَ مَلَلْ؞

اِوْࢼٜۛلْ اٜ سَعِيدُ مُحَمَّدُ وٜلْ،
سٜيلٜنْکٜ لٜࢽۛجࣾلْ، ࢼُتَنْکٜ لَرَلْ،

مࣾࢽۛبٜنْکٜ هࣾطَنْدٜ عٜلَشْعَرِ يَنْکٜ
تࣾکَبّٜۛ اٜ مَالِکِ يَنکٜ طَتَلْ؞

مِطࣾيٜتِّرَ جࣾومَمْ رٜوْنِدِرَلْ؞
يࣾعࣾ جُولْ عٜنُلَاطُ يٜطَاطࣾ بۛࣾرَلْ؞

Adlam Script

𞤒𞤢𞥄 𞤶𞤮𞥅𞤥-𞤲𞤢𞤲𞤵𞤺𞤮𞤤⹁ 𞤸𞤫𞤯𞤮 𞤸𞤢𞥄𞤤𞤢 𞤺𞤮𞤪𞤫𞤤⹁
𞤶𞤭𞤴𞤢𞤲'𞤺𞤫𞤤⹁ 𞤤𞤮'𞤵𞤲'𞤺𞤫𞤤⹁ 𞤧𞤭 𞤢 𞤬𞤢𞥄𞤤𞤢 𞤥𞤢𞤤𞤢𞤤⁏

𞤋𞤱𞤲'𞤺𞤫𞤤 𞤫 𞤅𞤢’𞤭𞥅𞤣𞤵 𞤃𞤵𞤸𞤢𞤥𞥆𞤢𞤣𞤵𞤱𞤫𞤤⹁
𞤅𞤫𞥅𞤤𞤫𞤲𞤳𞤫 𞤤𞤫𞤻𞤮𞤤⹁ 𞤊𞤵𞥅𞤼𞤢𞤲𞤳𞤫 𞤤𞤢𞤪𞤢𞤤⹁

𞤃𞤮𞤥𞤦𞤫𞤲𞤳𞤫 𞤸𞤮𞤯𞤢𞤲𞤣𞤫 𞤫 𞤂𞤢𞥃'𞤢𞤪𞤭𞤴𞤢𞤲𞤳𞤫
𞤼𞤮 𞤑𞤢𞤩𞥆𞤫 𞤫 𞤃𞤢𞥄𞤤𞤭𞤳𞤭𞤴𞤢𞤲𞤳𞤫 𞤍𞤢𞤼𞤢𞤤.

𞤃𞤭𞤯𞤮 𞤴𞤫𞤼𞥆𞤭𞤪𞤢 𞤔𞤮𞥅𞤥𞤢𞤥 𞤪𞤫𞤱𞤲𞤭𞤲'𞤣𞤭𞤪𞤢𞤤.
𞤒𞤮 𞤌 𞤶𞤵𞥅𞤤 𞤫 𞤐𞤵𞤤𞤢𞥄𞤯𞤮 𞤴𞤫𞤯𞤢𞥄𞤯𞤮 𞤩𞤵𞤪𞤢𞤤.
