= Labé Region =

Region of Guinea

Coordinates: 11°45′N 12°0′W

Labé
- Region
- Labé Region in Guinea
- Country: Guinea
- Capital: Labé

Government
  - Governor: Robert Soumah

Area
  - Total: 22,869 km^{2} (8,830 sq mi)

Population (2025 census)
  - Total: 1,239,897
  - Density: 54.217/km^{2} (140.42/sq mi)
- HDI (2023): 0.430 low · 7th of 8

Labé Region (Pular: 𞤁𞤭𞥅𞤱𞤢𞤤 𞤂𞤢𞤦𞤫) is a region of Guinea located in the north-central part of the country. It is bordered by the countries of Senegal and Mali and the Guinean regions of Faranah, Kindia, Mamou, and Boké.

== Administrative divisions ==
Labé Region is divided into five prefectures; which are further sub-divided into 53 sub-prefectures:

- Koubia Prefecture (6 sub-prefectures)
- Labé Prefecture (13 sub-prefectures)
- Lélouma Prefecture (11 sub-prefectures)
- Mali Prefecture (13 sub-prefectures)
- Tougué Prefecture (10 sub-prefectures)

== Geography ==
Labé Region is traversed by the northwesterly line of equal latitude and longitude.
