= Nzérékoré Region =

Region of Guinea

Nzérékoré
- Region
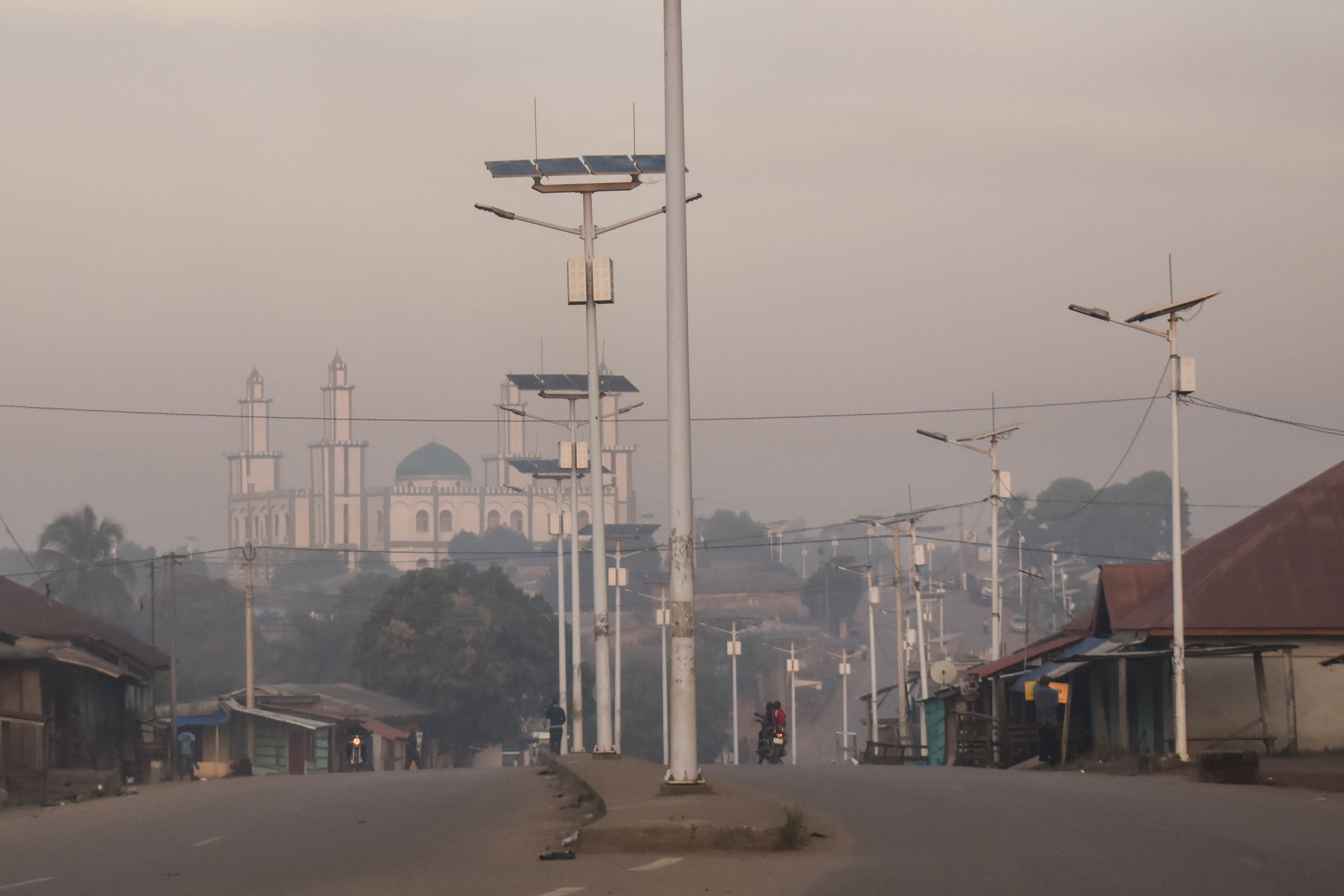
- City of Nzérékoré

- Nzérékoré Region in Guinea
- Coordinates: 8°30′N 9°0′W
- Country: Guinea
- Regional capital: Nzérékoré

Area
  - Total: 37,668 km^{2} (14,544 sq mi)

Population (2025 census)
  - Total: 2,481,986
  - Density: 65.891/km^{2} (170.66/sq mi)
- ISO 3166 code: GN-N
- HDI (2023): 0.485 low · 3rd of 8

The Nzérékoré Region (N'Ko: ߒߛߙߍߜߍ߬ߘߍ߫ ߕߌ߲߬ߞߎߘߎ߲) is one of the eight administrative regions of Guinea. Spread across an area of 37,668 km^{2} (14,544 sq mi), its capital and largest city is Nzérékoré. Located in the south-west corner of the country, it is bordered by the countries of Sierra Leone, Liberia, and Ivory Coast, and the Guinean regions of Kankan and Faranah.

== Geography ==
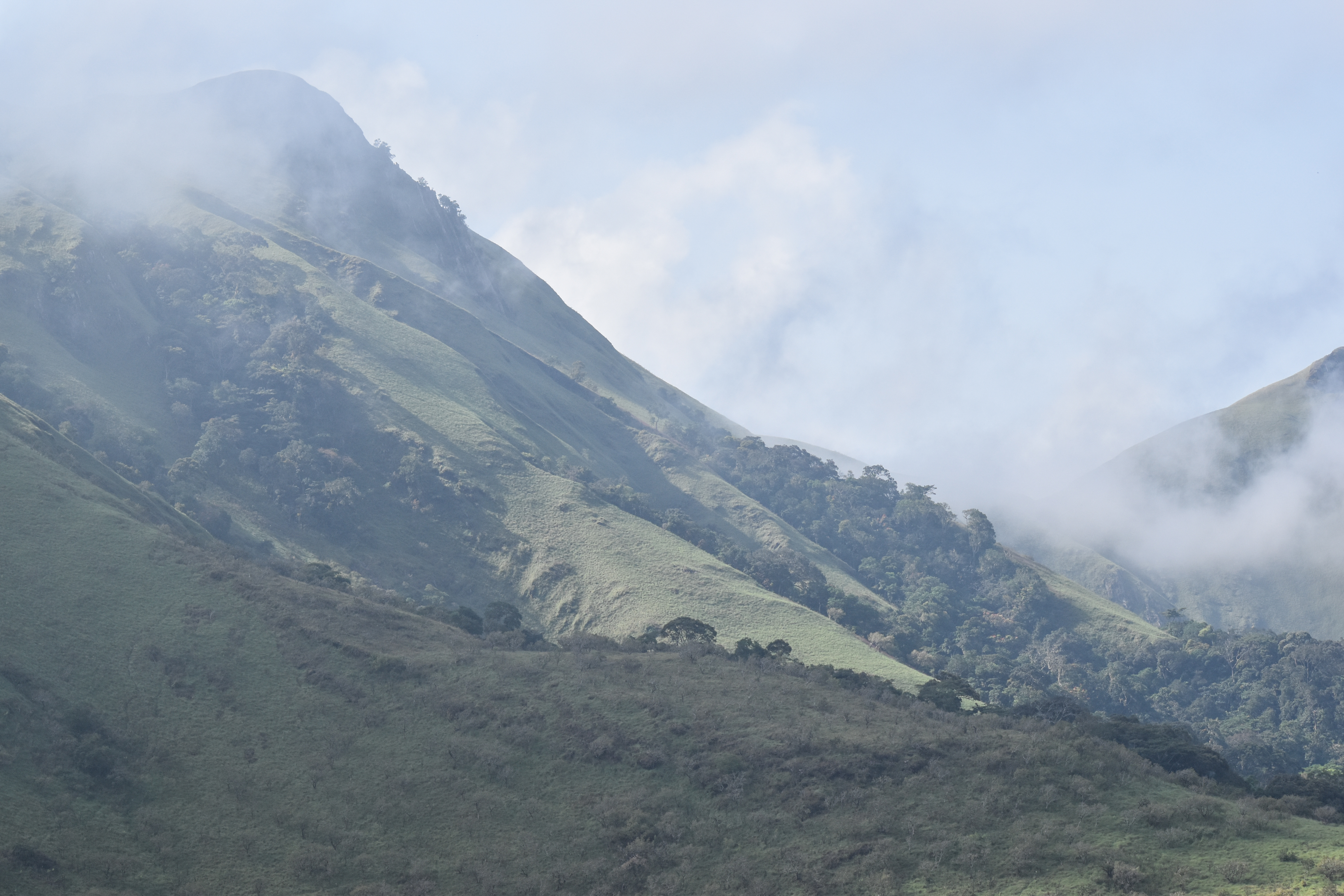
Mount Nimba

Nzérékoré is one of the eight administrative regions of Guinea. Located in the south-west corner of the country in the geographic region of Forest Guinea, it is spread across an area of 37,668 km^{2} (14,544 sq mi). Its capital and largest city is Nzérékoré. It is bordered by the countries of Sierra Leone, Liberia, and Ivory Coast, and the Guinean regions of Kankan and Faranah.

The topography of the region includes several forested highlands, including the Nimba Range, Simandou Massif, and Ziama Massif. The region contains the headwaters of several rivers such as the Milo, Sankarani, and Dion rivers, which flow northward to become tributaries the Niger River. Others include the Moa, Lofa, St. Paul, St. John, Cavalla, and Sassandra rivers which flow southwards through the neighboring countries to empty into the Atlantic Ocean.

Birds in the region include buff-throated sunbird, splendid starling, woodland kingfisher, Northern fiscal, and village weaver. The region is also home to a variety of insects.

== Administration ==
Nzérékoré Region is divided into six prefectures– Beyla, Guéckédou, Lola, Macenta, Nzérékoré, and Yomou. These are further divided into the urban commune of Nzérékoré and 66 sub-prefectures.

== Demographics ==
As per the 2018 census, the region had a population of more than 1.57 million. The region is one of the worst affected in the longstanding ethnical and communal clashes in Guinea. The region was also affected by an outbreak of the Ebola virus in 2021.

== See also ==
- Bossou
- Forest Guinea
- Guinea
- Nzérékoré
- Mount Nimba Strict Nature Reserve
- Ziama Massif
