= Prefectures of Guinea =

Guinea is divided into 8 regions among which the national capital Conakry ranks as a special zone (and is further divided into 5 communes). The other 7 regions are further subdivided into 33 prefectures and thence into sub-prefectures; which are later subdivided into local units (i.e.: districts and quarters) and further subdivided into smaller units (i.e.: villages and sectors).

== Prefectures ==
The special zone of Conakry and the 33 prefectures are shown below according to their region, with their populations at recent censuses:

N^{o} on map	Name	Area (km^{2})	Census 1983 (4 Feb)	Census 1996 (1 Dec)	Census 2014 (1 March)	Admin. Capital
	Région de Conakry	450	710,372	1,092,936	1,667,864	
4	Conakry	450	710,372	1,092,936	1,667,864	Conakry
	Région de Boké	31,186	508,724	760,119	1,081,445	
2	Boffa	5,050	113,981	156,558	211,063	Boffa
3	Boké	11,124	168,924	293,917	449,405	Boké
12	Fria	2,016	52,908	81,790	96,527	Fria
13	Gaoual	7,758	103,516	137,624	194,245	Gaoual
20	Koundara	5,238	69,395	90,230	130,205	Koundara
	Région de Faranah	35,581	425,160	602,845	942,733	
6	Dabola	6,350	73,937	111,363	182,951	Dabola
8	Dinguiraye	7,965	99,363	137,380	195,662	Dinguiraye
10	Faranah	12,966	109,104	147,347	280,511	Faranah
18	Kissidougou	8,300	142,756	206,755	283,609	Kissidougou
	Région de Kankan	72,145	640,432	1,011,644	1,986,329	
15	Kankan	19,750	172,767	262,350	472,112	Kankan
16	Kérouané	7,020	87,040	154,861	211,017	Kérouané
21	Kouroussa	14,050	107,741	150,059	268,224	Kouroussa
28	Mandiana	12,825	111,671	173,150	339,527	Mandiana
31	Siguiri	18,500	161,303	271,224	695,449	Siguiri
	Région de Kindia	28,873	555,937	928,312	1,559,185	
5	Coyah	1,275	116,840	85,148	264,164	Coyah
9	Dubréka	4,350	-	131,337	328,418	Dubréka
11	Forécariah	4,384	90,403	195,836	244,649	Forécariah
17	Kindia	9,648	163,032	287,611	438,315	Kindia
32	Télimélé	9,216	185,662	228,380	283,639	Télimélé
	Région de Labé	22,869	642,617	799,545	995,717	
19	Koubia	3,725	70,715	91,882	101,171	Koubia
22	Labé	2,242	185,594	251,702	318,633	Labé
23	Lélouma	4,275	121,079	137,273	162,634	Lélouma
26	Mali	8,802	184,936	204,041	290,320	Mali
33	Tougué	3,825	80,293	114,647	122,959	Tougué
	Région de Mamou	17,074	437,212	612,218	732,117	
7	Dalaba	3,328	96,571	136,656	136,320	Dalaba
27	Mamou	9,108	139,764	236,326	318,738	Mamou
30	Pita	4,638	200,877	239,236	277,059	Pita
	Région de Nzérékoré	37,658	740,128	1,348,787	1,663,582	
1	Beyla	13,612	120,610	169,730	325,482	Beyla
14	Guéckédou	4,750	150,997	347,541	291,823	Guéckédou
24	Lola	4,688	76,689	134,326	175,213	Lola
25	Macenta	7,056	142,355	278,789	298,282	Macenta
29	Nzérékoré	3,632	194,600	283,413	396,118	Nzérékoré
34	Yomou	3,920	54,877	134,988	176,664	Yomou
	Total Guinea	245,836	4,660,582	7,156,406	10,628,972	

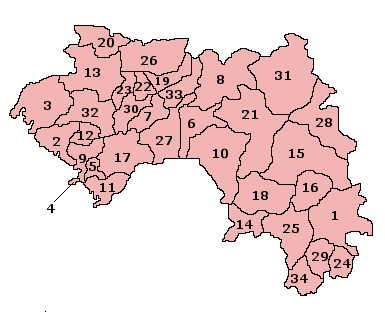

== See also ==
- Administrative divisions of Guinea
- Sub-prefectures of Guinea
- ISO 3166-2:GN
