= Samaia =

Samaia may refer to:

- Samaia, a kind of Georgian dance
- Arai–Samaia languages of New Guinea
- Guilherme Samaia (born 1996), Brazilian racing driver
- Bara Char Samaia, a village in Bangladesh

== See also ==
- Samaya (disambiguation)
