= Balandougouba =

Balandougouba may refer to:

- Balandougouba, Mandiana, Guinea
- Balandougouba, Siguiri, Guinea
