= Samay =

Samay may refer to:

== Arts and entertainment ==
- Samay: When Time Strikes, 2003 Indian action film
- Samay (band), a Leeds-based world music group

== People ==
- Samay Shah, Indian actor
- Samay Raina, Indian comedian
- Soluna Samay, Guatemalan singer

== Other ==
- Samay (mythology), figure in the mythology of the Jola people in Senegal, The Gambia and Guinea-Bissau
- Samay language, Bantu language of Gabon
- Samayā, or Samay, a unit of time in India
- Samay, Hindi-language news channel of the Sahara India Pariwar
- Ei Samay Sangbadpatra, a Bengali-language daily newspaper in India
- Shameyevo (Bashkir: Samay), a village in Bashkortostan, Russia

== See also ==
- Samaya (disambiguation)
- Chamayam (disambiguation)
