= Daro (disambiguation) =

Daro District is a district in Malaysia.

Daro may also refer to:

- Daro (state constituency), represented in the Sarawak State Legislative Assembly
- Daro language, a dialect of an Austronesian language spoken in Sarawak
- Daro, Guinea, town in Guinea

== See also ==
- Darro (disambiguation)
