= Kalinko =

Kalinko may refer to:

- Kalinko, Guinea
- Kalinko, Poland
