= Kollet =

Kollet may refer to:

- Kollet, Labé, a sub-prefecture in Guinea
- Kollet, Télimélé, a sub-prefecture in Guinea
