= Martine Condé Ilboudo =

Burkinabé film director

- Born: 1948 (age 77–78); Siguiri, Guinea
- Citizenship: Burkinabé
- Education: University of Ottawa
- Occupation: Film Director
- Notable work: Message des femmes pour Beijing

Martine Condé Ilboudo (born 1948) is a Burkinabé film director.

== Life ==
Martine Condé Ilboudo was born in Saint-Alexis, Siguiri, Guinea. She has a masters in communication from the University of Ottawa. After studying communication, she became one of the first to establish a production company in Burkina Faso.

Martine Condé Ilboudo was appointed President of the National Council of Communication (CNC). In December 2017 she was decorated by the government as Commander of the Order of Merit for Arts, Letters and Communication.

== Films ==
- Siao 92, 1992
- Jazz a Ouaga, 1993
- Un cri dans la sahel, 1994
- Message des femmes pour Beijing, 1995
- Être femme aujourd'hui, 1998
- Less Percussions de Guinée, 2000
