= Balandougouba, Kankan =

Balandougouba, Kankan may refer to:

- Balandougouba, Mandiana, a town and sub-prefecture in Mandiana Prefecture, Kankan Region, Guinea
- Balandougouba, Siguiri, a town and sub-prefecture in Siguiri Prefecture, Kankan Region, Guinea
