= Kindia gangan =

Conservation status
- Endangered (IUCN 3.1)

Scientific classification
- Kingdom: Plantae
- Clade: Tracheophytes
- Clade: Angiosperms
- Clade: Eudicots
- Clade: Asterids
- Order: Gentianales
- Family: Rubiaceae
- Genus: Kindia; Cheek (2018)
- Species: K. gangan

Binomial name
- Kindia gangan Cheek (2018)

Species of flowering plant

Kindia gangan is a species of flowering plant in the family Rubiaceae. It is the sole species in genus Kindia. It is endemic to Guinea in West Africa. It is known only from the northeastern slope of Mount Gangan in Kindia Prefecture from 230 to 540 meters elevation, in the Guinean forest–savanna ecoregion.

It is a small perennial multi-stemmed subshrub. It produces white flowers from June to September which develop into greenish-white berries.

It lives on high sandstone cliff faces where it grows in narrow fissures which are shaded over part of the day. The plants typically occur in colonies of 7 to 15 plants, and rarely 1 to 3. The plant is thought to be pollinated by bats.

The species has an estimated extent of occurrence (EOO) of 28 km^{2} and an estimated area of occupancy (AOO) of 20 km^{2}. Field work in the species' known range found only 86 individuals. The known populations grow in Gangan Classified Forest. Sandstone quarrying is common in the area, but isn't known to be an immediate threat to the species.
