= Linko =

Linko may refer to:

- Linkou District, New Taipei (formerly Linkou, Taipei County)
- Linko, Guinea
