= Dabola Prefecture =

Coordinates: 10°44′53″N 11°06′22″W

- Prefecture
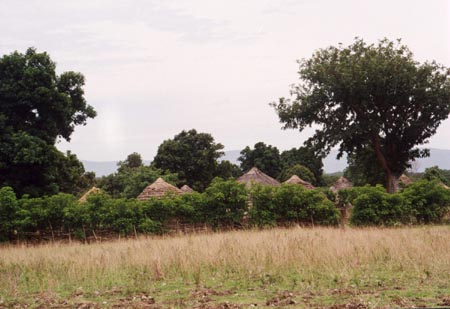

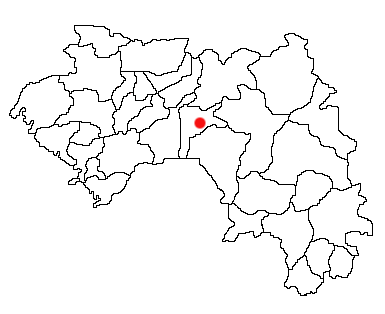
- Location of Dabola Prefecture and seat in Guinea.
- Country: Guinea
- Region: Faranah Region
- Capital: Dabola

Area
  - Total: 6,350 km^{2} (2,450 sq mi)

Population (2014 census)
  - Total: 182,951
  - Density: 28.8/km^{2} (74.6/sq mi)
- Time zone: UTC+0 (Guinea Standard Time)

Dabola is a prefecture located in the Faranah Region of Guinea. The capital is Dabola. The prefecture covers an area of 6,350 km.² and has an estimated population of 182,951.

== Sub-prefectures ==
The prefecture is divided administratively into 9 sub-prefectures:

1. Dabola-Centre
2. Arfamoussaya
3. Banko
4. Bissikrima
5. Dogomet
6. Kankama
7. Kindoyé
8. Konindou
9. N'Déma
