= Nounkounkan =

- Sub-prefecture
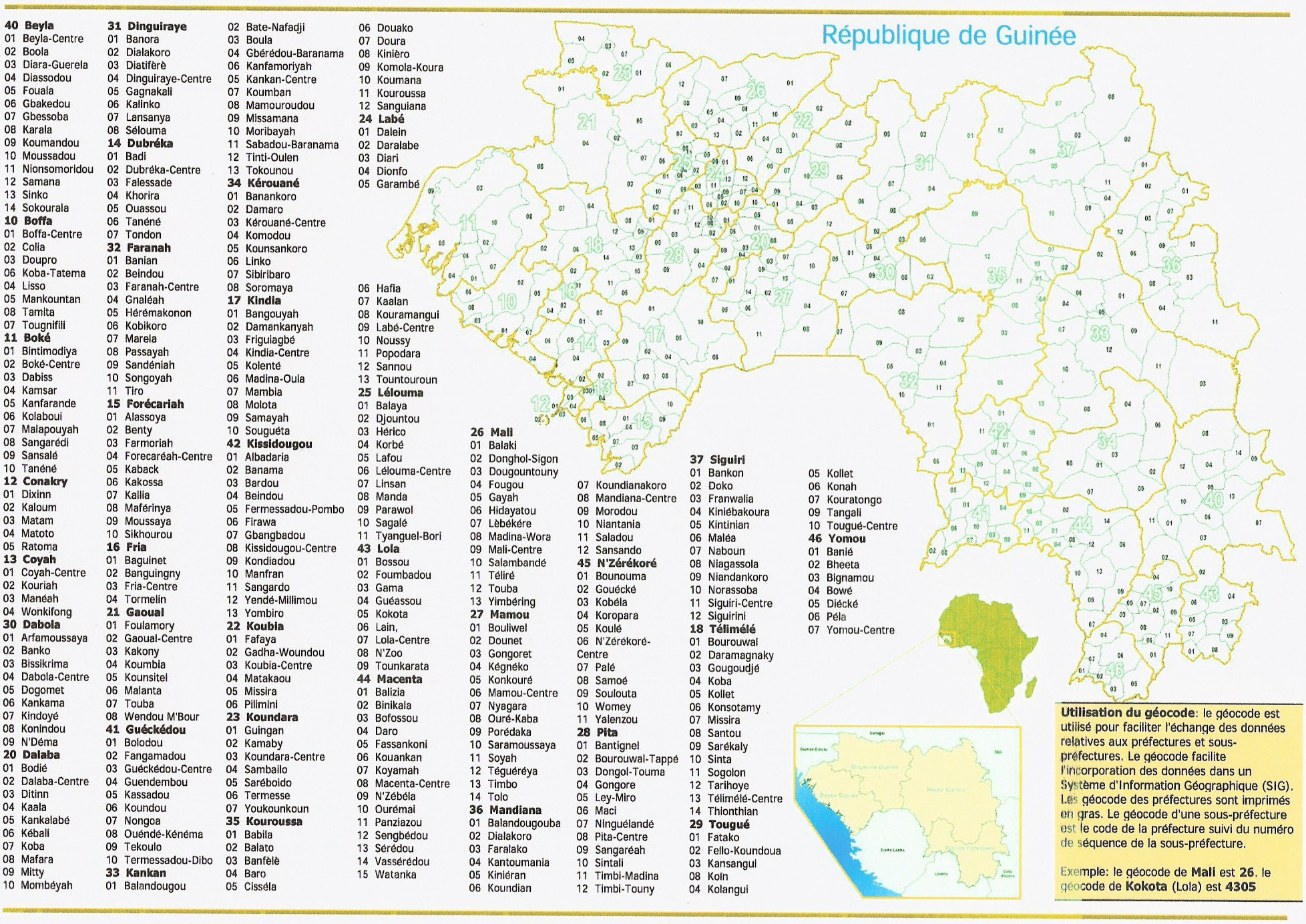

- Location within Central African Republic
- Country: Guinea

Nounkounkan in Arabic نونکونکان is a sub-prefecture in Guinea. Its population is 12,875 according to 2014 census.

== History ==
Nounkounkan was founded by Mankandian Magassouba in the 13th century.

== Geography ==
Nounkounkan is located 628 km from Conakry the capitale of Guinea.

== Economy ==
The feast of the pound in May attracts every year many visitors.
