= Lola, Guinea =

Lola
- Sub-prefecture and town
- Location in Guinea
- Coordinates: 7°48′N 8°32′W
- Country: Guinea
- Region: Nzérékoré Region
- Prefecture: Lola

Population (2008 est.)
  - Total: 60,711

Lola is a town in the Nzérékoré Region of Guinea, near the Liberian border. It is the capital of Lola Prefecture and has a population 60,711 (2008 est).

It is near Mount Nimba, the highest peak in Guinea. It is known for traditional medicine, cloth manufacture and the Timneh parrot.
