= Macenta =

City in southern Guinea

- Sub-prefecture and town
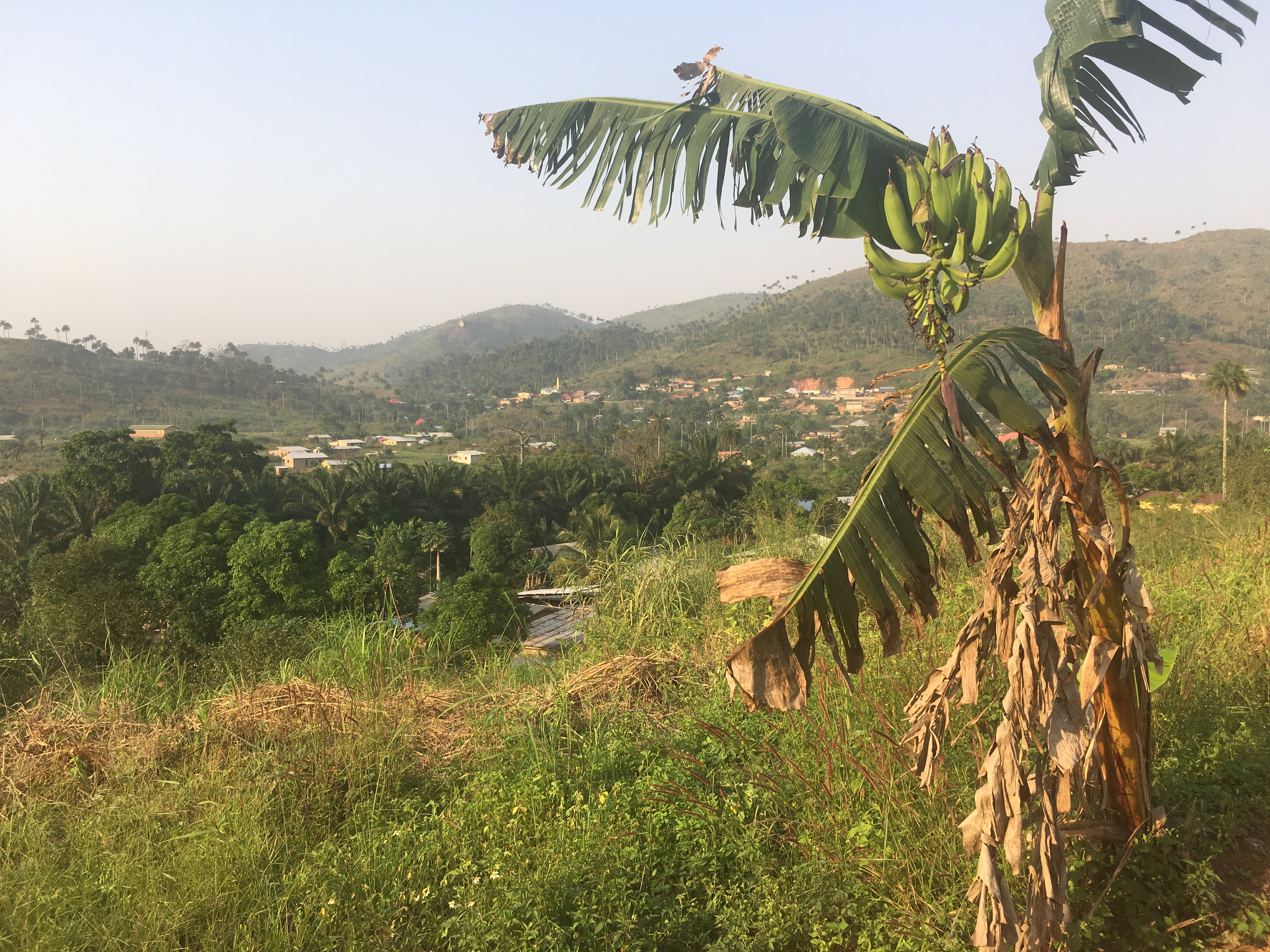
- Landscape on the outskirts of Macenta

- Location in Guinea
- Coordinates: 8°33′N 9°28′W
- Country: Guinea
- Region: Nzérékoré Region
- Prefecture: Macenta Prefecture

Population (2008 est.)
  - Total: 88,376

Macenta is one of fourteen cities in the country of Guinea, West Africa, in the south of the country. It is the capital of the Macenta Prefecture, the Nzérékoré Region situated in the southeastern border of the country.

== Geography ==
Macenta is the capital of the Macenta Prefecture in southeastern Guinea. It is located in the Guinea Highlands at an elevation of 620 metres (2,030 ft), between the road from Nzérékoré to Guéckédou. The Nianda River joins the Makonda River near Macenta. Macenta is also located near the border of Liberia.

=== Climate ===
Macenta has a tropical monsoon climate (Köppen climate classification Am).

Climate data for Macenta
Month	Jan	Feb	Mar	Apr	May	Jun	Jul	Aug	Sep	Oct	Nov	Dec	Year
Mean daily maximum °C (°F)	34.0 (93.2)	35.2 (95.4)	34.7 (94.5)	33.0 (91.4)	32.7 (90.9)	31.5 (88.7)	30.1 (86.2)	29.7 (85.5)	31.0 (87.8)	30.2 (86.4)	31.6 (88.9)	32.2 (90.0)	32.2 (90.0)
Daily mean °C (°F)	22.6 (72.7)	24.6 (76.3)	25.6 (78.1)	25.6 (78.1)	25.2 (77.4)	24.4 (75.9)	23.7 (74.7)	23.7 (74.7)	24.5 (76.1)	24.4 (75.9)	24.0 (75.2)	22.7 (72.9)	24.2 (75.6)
Mean daily minimum °C (°F)	9.5 (49.1)	11.4 (52.5)	14.4 (57.9)	17.3 (63.1)	17.9 (64.2)	17.6 (63.7)	17.9 (64.2)	18.3 (64.9)	17.7 (63.9)	17.2 (63.0)	14.7 (58.5)	10.6 (51.1)	15.4 (59.7)
Average rainfall mm (inches)	12 (0.5)	46 (1.8)	99 (3.9)	188 (7.4)	227 (8.9)	282 (11.1)	383 (15.1)	535 (21.1)	466 (18.3)	264 (10.4)	168 (6.6)	41 (1.6)	2,711 (106.7)
Average rainy days (≥ 1.0 mm)	1	5	8	13	15	18	22	25	22	17	10	2	158
Average relative humidity (%)	72	69	71	77	80	83	85	78	81	81	81	77	78
Source: NOAA

== Recent history ==
French colonial and settlement influx influenced by Liberians circa 2000. It is the source of the 2014 African Ebola outbreak.

== Economy ==
Macenta is the major trading market town for tea, coffee, rice, cassava, shea butter extract, kola nuts, palm oil, and kernels grown nearby. A tea processing plant was built in Macenta in 1968, and the town has an agricultural research station, a sawmill, and several secondary schools. A trade in smuggling is believed to have developed in Macenta. Tigui Mining Company, which specialises in gold and diamond extraction and is owned by former model Tigui Camara, has licenses to work on diamond extraction in the locality.

The town is served by Macenta Airport.

== Hospitals ==
- Hôpital Préfectoral de Macenta
- Centre Medical Mission Phil Africaine
- Centre de Santé Bowa
- Centre de Santé de Patrice

== Schools ==
- Collège de Tripo Cabar
- l'École Patrice Lumumba
- Ecole primaire de Kamandou Koura

== Districts ==
Kamandou Koura
Kamandou Cite
Bowa 1
Bowa 2
Bamala
