= Tindo, Guinea =

Tindo
- Sub-prefecture
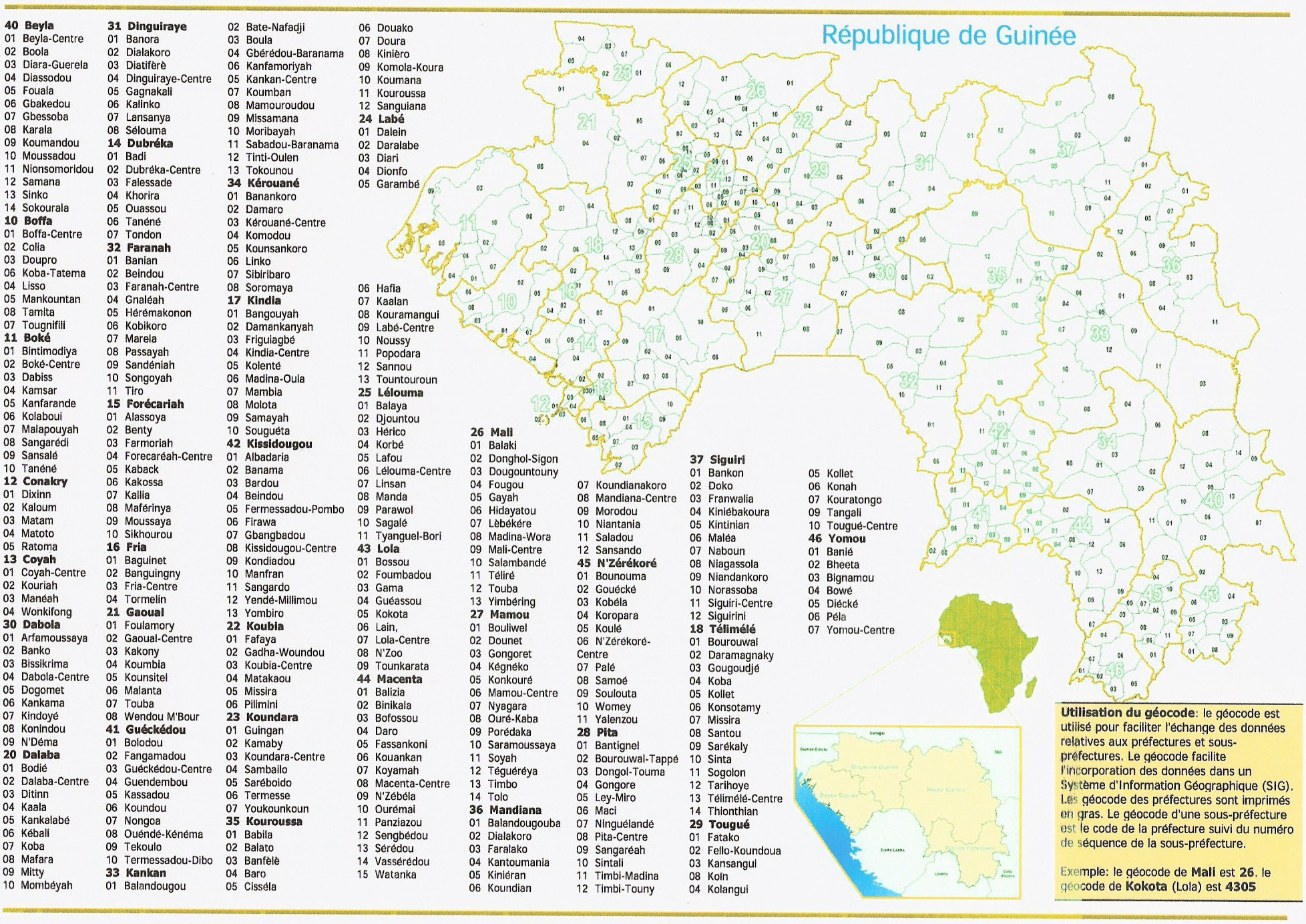

- Location within Guinea
- Country: Guinea

Tindo is a sub-prefecture in Guinea. Its population is 5,052 according to 2014 census.
