= Fougou =

Fougoun
- Sub-prefecture and town
- Location in Guinea
- Coordinates: 11°54′N 12°18′W
- Country: Guinea
- Region: Labé Region
- Prefecture: Mali Prefecture
- Time zone: UTC+0 (GMT)

Fougou, Guinea is a town and sub-prefecture in the Dalaba Prefecture in the Mamou Region of northern Guinea.
