= Tomba-kanssa =

Tomba-Kanssa
- Sub-prefecture and town
- Location in Guinea
- Coordinates: 11°43′28″N 10°11′28″W
- Country: Guinea
- Region: Kankan Region
- Prefecture: Siguiri Prefecture

Government
  - Type: Sub-prefect
  - Subprefecture: Joseph soumah
- Time zone: UTC+0 (GMT)

Tomba kanssa is a town and sub-prefecture in the Siguiri Prefecture in the Kankan Region of northern Guinea.

== Administrative subdivision ==
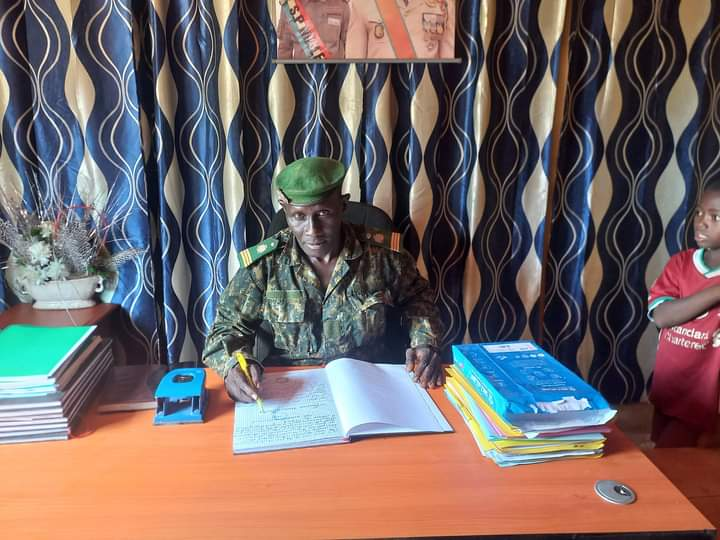

Tomba Kanssa is made up of six districts.

Districts	Sectors
Tomba Kanssa	Tomba Doula
Tombani	Tomba Fontou
Tomba Kobila	Tomba Boufé
Beretela kansa	Beretela Doula
Berèla	Madina Koura
Bougoulan	Kebèbesebeya

== History ==
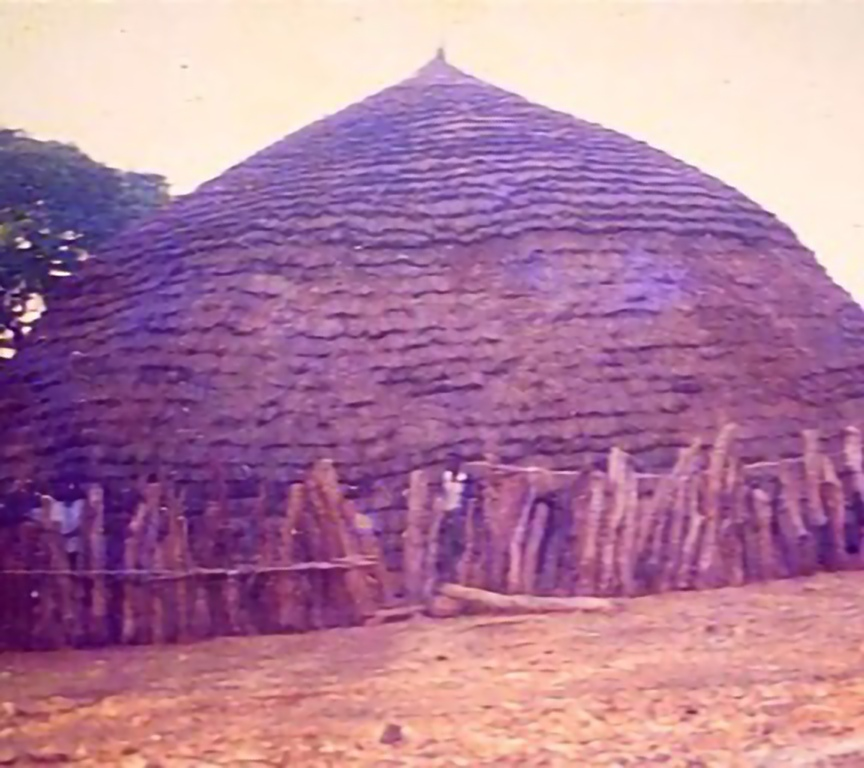
Tomba-Kanssa – Une sous-préfecture de la Guinée

Tomba Kanssa is a Sub-prefectures of Guinea created in 2021 and attached to the Siguiri Prefecture in the Kankan Region.

== Education ==
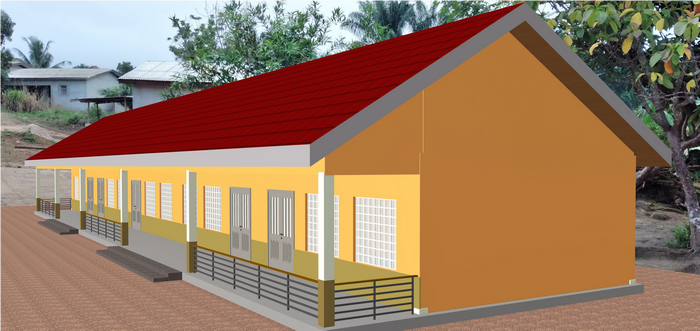
CENTER NAFA DEL TOMBA KANSSA

In partnership with Nordgold, management, the Dinguiraye Mining Company (SMD) is building a technical arts and crafts school in Tomba Kanssa, this NAFA Center (literacy and trade learning center) will contribute to strengthening capacity through functional literacy, training and apprenticeship programs for women and young girls in the sub-prefectures of Tomba Kanssa The objective is to facilitate access to education and improve the quality of education, thus contributing to the fulfillment of the requirements of the government's sectoral policy in the field of education, which has identified as priorities the development of school, recreational and educational infrastructures,

== Population ==
In 2016, the number of inhabitants is estimated at 36,965, based on an official extrapolation of the 2014 census which had counted 32,867 inhabitants.
