= Foulamory =

- Sub-prefecture and town
- Location in Guinea
- Coordinates: 12°10′N 13°38′W
- Country: Guinea
- Region: Boké Region
- Prefecture: Gaoual Prefecture

Population (2014)
  - Total: 10,207
- Time zone: UTC+0 (GMT)

Foulamory is a town and sub-prefecture in Gaoual Prefecture, in the Boké Region of northwestern Guinea. As of 2014 it had a population of 10,207 people.
