= Komodou =

- Sub-prefecture and town
- Location in Guinea
- Coordinates: 9°49′52″N 9°4′49″W
- Country: Guinea
- Region: Kankan Region
- Prefecture: Kérouané Prefecture

Population (2014)
  - Total: 21,775

Komodou is a town and sub-prefecture in Kérouané Prefecture in the Kankan Region of Guinea. As of 2014 it had a population of 21,775 people.
