= Dinguiraye Prefecture =

Coordinates: 11°18′03″N 10°43′05″W

- Prefecture
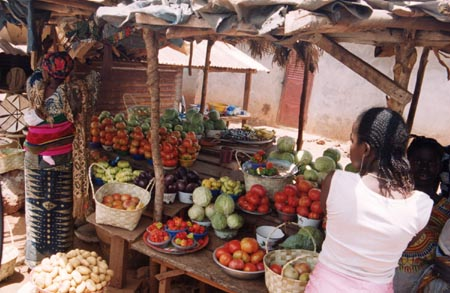

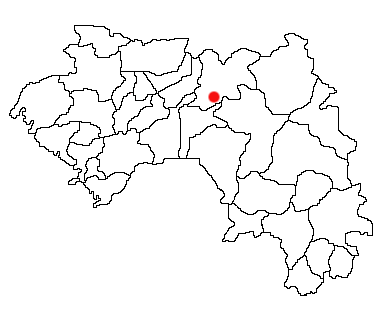
- Location of Dinguiraye Prefecture and seat in Guinea.
- Country: Guinea
- Region: Faranah Region
- Capital: Dinguiraye

Area
  - Total: 7,965 km^{2} (3,075 sq mi)

Population (2014 census)
  - Total: 195,662
  - Density: 24.57/km^{2} (63.62/sq mi)
- Time zone: UTC+0 (Guinea Standard Time)

Dinguiraye is a prefecture located in the Faranah Region of Guinea. The capital is Dinguiraye. The prefecture covers an area of 7,965 km.² and has a population of 195,662.

== Sub-prefectures ==
The prefecture is divided administratively into 8 sub-prefectures:

- Dinguiraye-Centre
- Banora
- Dialakoro
- Diatiféré
- Gagnakali
- Kalinko
- Lansanya
- Sélouma
