= Arfamoussaya =

- Sub-prefecture and town
- Location in Guinea
- Coordinates: 10°46′N 11°22′W
- Country: Guinea
- Region: Faranah Region
- Prefecture: Dabola Prefecture

Population (2014)
  - Total: 16,561
- Time zone: UTC+0 (GMT)

Arfamoussaya is a town and sub-prefecture in the Dabola Prefecture in the Faranah Region of western Guinea. As of 2014 it had a population of 16,561 people.
