= Banko, Guinea =

Banko
- Sub-prefecture and town
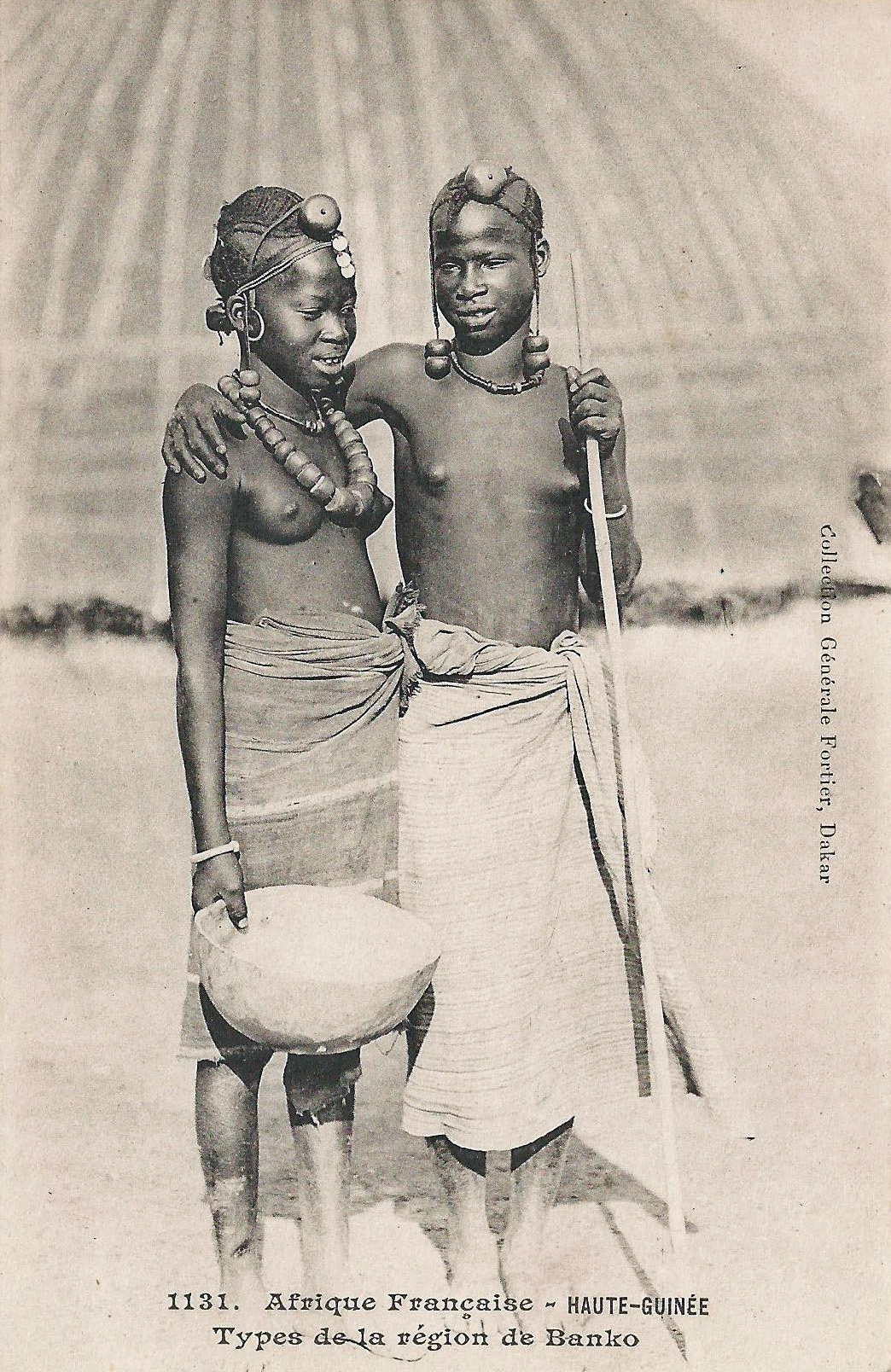

- Location in Guinea
- Coordinates: 10°41′N 10°40′W
- Country: Guinea
- Region: Faranah Region
- Prefecture: Dabola Prefecture

Population
  - Total: 23,638
- Time zone: UTC+0 (GMT)

Banko is a town and sub-prefecture in the Dabola Prefecture in the Faranah Region of Guinea. As of 2014 it had a population of 23,638 people.
