= Wendou M'Bour =

- Sub-prefecture and town
- Location in Guinea
- Coordinates: 11°26′00″N 13°53′00″W
- Country: Guinea
- Region: Boké Region
- Prefecture: Gaoual Prefecture

Population (2014)
  - Total: 25,150
- Time zone: UTC+0 (GMT)

Wendou M'Bour (or Wendou Borou) is a town and sub-prefecture in the Gaoual Prefecture in the Boké Region of north-western Guinea. As of 2014 it had a population of 25,150 people.
