= Sibiribaro =

- Sub-prefecture and town
- Location in Guinea
- Coordinates: 9°02′N 9°24′W
- Country: Guinea
- Region: Kankan Region
- Prefecture: Kérouané Prefecture

Population (2014)
  - Total: 16,485
- Time zone: UTC+0 (GMT)

Sibiribaro is a town and sub-prefecture in the Kérouané Prefecture in the Kankan Region of south-eastern Guinea. As of 2014 it had a population of 16,485 people.
