= Koubia Prefecture =

Coordinates: 11.5833°N 11.9000°W

- Prefecture
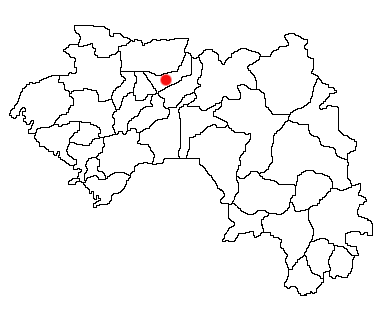
- Location of Koubia Prefecture and seat in Guinea.
- Country: Guinea
- Region: Labé Region
- Capital: Koubia

Area
  - Total: 2,800 km^{2} (1,100 sq mi)

Population
  - Total: 114,000
  - Density: 41/km^{2} (110/sq mi)
- Time zone: UTC+0 (Guinea Standard Time)

Koubia (Pular: 𞤍𞤢𞤤𞤭𞥅𞤪𞤫 𞤑𞤵𞤦𞤭𞤴𞤢𞥄) is a prefecture located in the Labé Region of Guinea in the Fouta Djallon mountains. Fulas are the majority ethnic group in the region with Fula (Pular) as the primary language. The capital is Koubia. The prefecture covers an area of 2,800 km.² and has an estimated population of 114,000.

== Sub-prefectures ==
The prefecture is divided administratively into 6 sub-prefectures:

1. Koubia-Centre
2. Fafaya
3. Gadha-Woundou
4. Matakaou
5. Missira
6. Pilimini
