= Chamayam =

Chamayam (lit. 'time') may refer to:

- Chamayam (1981 film), an unrealized Indian Malayalam-language film starring Kamal Haasan
- Chamayam (1993 film), an Indian Malayalam-language film directed by Bharathan, starring Manoj K Jayan and Sithara

== See also ==
- Samaya (disambiguation)
- Samay (disambiguation)
