= Macenta Airport =

Airport in Nzérékoré, Guinea

Macenta Airport Aéroport de Macenta (French)
- IATA: MCA; ICAO: GUMA

Summary
- Airport type: Public
- Serves: Macenta
- Elevation AMSL: 3,396 ft / 1,035 m
- Coordinates: 8°28′55″N 9°31′30″W

Map
- Location of the airport in Guinea

Runways
Direction	Length		Surface
Direction	m	ft	Surface
07/25	1,500	4,921	Grass
- Source: Google Maps GCM

Macenta Airport (IATA: MCA, ICAO: GUMA) is an airport serving Macenta, a town in the Nzérékoré Region of Guinea. The airport is 9 kilometres (5.6 mi) southwest of the town.

The Macenta non-directional beacon (Ident: MA) is located 0.78 nautical miles (1.4 km) off the approach end of Runway 07.

== See also ==
- Transport in Guinea
- List of airports in Guinea
