= Koubia =

- Sub-prefecture and town
- Location in Guinea
- Coordinates: 11°35′N 11°54′W
- Country: Guinea
- Region: Labe Region
- Prefecture: Koubia Prefecture

Population (2008)
  - Total: 2,486

Koubia (Pular: 𞤑𞤵𞤦𞤭𞤴𞤢𞥄) is a town located in northwestern Guinea. It is the capital of Koubia Prefecture. Population 2,486 (2008 est).
