= Kintinian =

- Sub-prefecture and town
- Location in Guinea
- Coordinates: 11°36′N 9°23′W
- Country: Guinea
- Region: Kankan Region
- Prefecture: Siguiri Prefecture
- Time zone: UTC+0 (GMT)

Kintinian is a town and sub-prefecture in the Siguiri Prefecture in the Kankan Region of northern Guinea.
