= Salambandé =

- Sub-prefecture and town
- Location in Guinea
- Coordinates: 11°50′N 11°53′W
- Country: Guinea
- Region: Labé Region
- Prefecture: Mali Prefecture
- Time zone: UTC+0 (GMT)

Salambandé is a town and sub-prefecture in the Mali Prefecture in the Labé Region of northern Guinea.
