= Mambia =

- Sub-prefecture and town
- Location in Guinea
- Coordinates: 9°49′41″N 13°7′4″W
- Country: Guinea
- Region: Kindia Region
- Prefecture: Kindia Prefecture
- Time zone: UTC+0 (GMT)

Mambia is a town and sub-prefecture in the Kindia Prefecture in the Kindia Region of western Guinea. It has an area of 808 km^{2}. As of 2014 its population is 26,500. 49% of the population is male while 51% is female.

Around 130 km west of the capital Conakry, the town Mambia is the chief-place of the sub-prefecture, and home to a major bauxite mining operation, the Compagnie Bauxite de Kindia (CBK).
