= Macenta Prefecture =

Coordinates: 8°32′37″N 9°28′22″W

- Prefecture
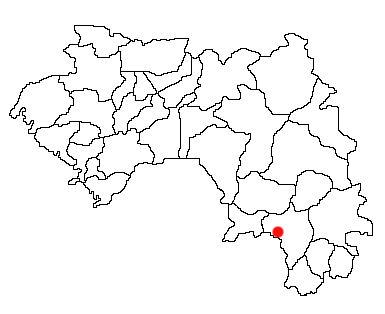
- Location of Macenta Prefecture and seat in Guinea.
- Country: Guinea
- Region: Nzérékoré Region
- Capital: Macenta

Area
  - Total: 7,056 km^{2} (2,724 sq mi)

Population (2014 census)
  - Total: 278,456
  - Density: 39.46/km^{2} (102.2/sq mi)
- Time zone: UTC+0 (Guinea Standard Time)

Macenta is a prefecture located in the Nzérékoré Region of Guinea. The capital is Macenta. The prefecture covers an area of 7,056 km.² and has an estimated population of 278,456.

== Sub-prefectures ==
The prefecture is divided administratively into 10 sub-prefectures:

1. Macenta-Centre
2. Balizia
3. Binikala
4. Bofossou
5. Daro
6. Fassankoni
7. Kouankan
8. Koyamah
9. N'Zébéla
10. Ourémai
11. Panziazou
12. Sengbédou
13. Sérédou
14. Vassérédou
15. Watanka
