= Madina-Wora =

- Sub-prefecture and town
- Location in Guinea
- Coordinates: 12°02′N 12°30′W
- Country: Guinea
- Region: Labé Region
- Prefecture: Mali Prefecture
- Time zone: UTC+0 (GMT)

Madina-Wora is a town and sub-prefecture in the Mali Prefecture in the Labé Region of northern Guinea. It is listed under Geocode 2608 and Has code GN.ML.MW. It is a third-order administrative division.
