= Dogomet =

- Sub-prefecture and town
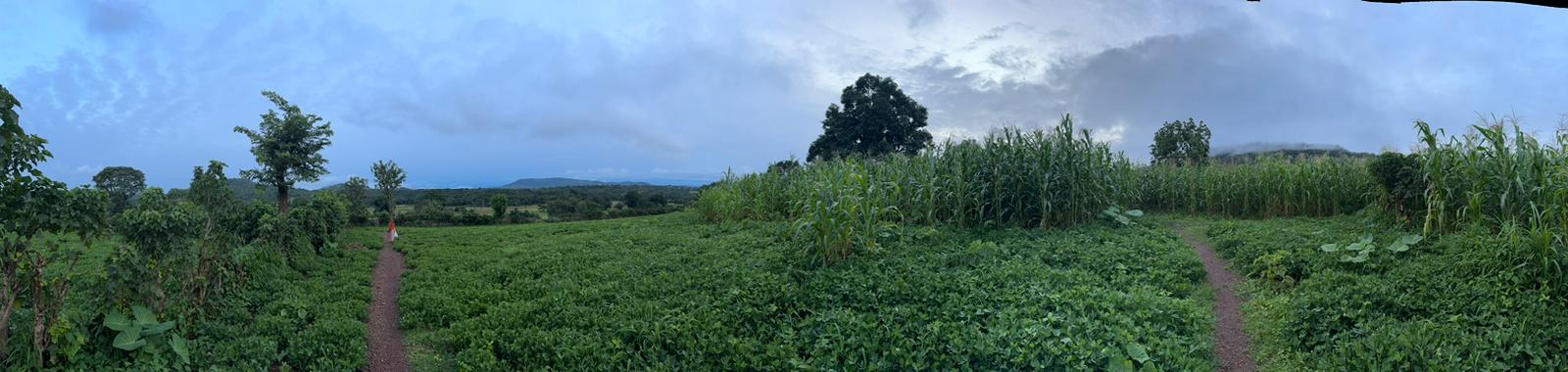

- Location in Guinea
- Coordinates: 10°53′N 11°09′W
- Country: Guinea
- Region: Faranah Region
- Prefecture: Dabola Prefecture

Population (2014)
  - Total: 29,040
- Time zone: UTC+0 (GMT)

Dogomet is a town and sub-prefecture in the Dabola Prefecture in the Faranah Region of Guinea. As of 2014 it had a population of 29,040 people.
