= Siguirini =

- Sub-prefecture and town
- Location in Guinea
- Coordinates: 11°49′N 10°03′W
- Country: Guinea
- Region: Kankan Region
- Prefecture: Siguiri Prefecture
- Time zone: UTC+0 (GMT)

Siguirini is a town and sub-prefecture in the Siguiri Prefecture in the Kankan Region of northern Guinea. As of 2014, the population in Siguirini was 54,953.
