= Lébékére =

- Sub-prefecture and town
- Location in Guinea
- Coordinates: 12°07′N 12°24′W
- Country: Guinea
- Region: Labé Region
- Prefecture: Mali Prefecture
- Time zone: UTC+0 (GMT)

Lébékére is a town and sub-prefecture in the Mali Prefecture in the Labé Region of northern Guinea.
