= Balandougouba, Siguiri =

Balandougouba
- Sub-prefecture and town
- Location in Guinea
- Coordinates: 11°19′N 8°25′W
- Country: Guinea
- Region: Kankan Region
- Prefecture: Siguiri Prefecture
- Time zone: UTC+0 (GMT)

Balandougouba is a border town in the Siguiri Prefecture in the Kankan Region of eastern Guinea.
