= Maléa =

- Sub-prefecture and town
- Location in Guinea
- Coordinates: 11°48′N 9°43′W
- Country: Guinea
- Region: Kankan Region
- Prefecture: Siguiri Prefecture
- Time zone: UTC+0 (GMT)

Maléa is a town and sub-prefecture in the Siguiri Prefecture in the Kankan Region of northern Guinea, near the border of Mali.
