= Fafaya =

- Sub-prefecture and town
- Location in Guinea
- Coordinates: 11°43′N 11°42′W
- Country: Guinea
- Region: Labé Region
- Prefecture: Koubia Prefecture
- Time zone: UTC+0 (GMT)

Fafaya is a town and sub-prefecture in the Koubia Prefecture in the Labé Region of northern Guinea.
