= Banguingny =

- Sub-prefecture and town
- Location in Guinea
- Coordinates: 10°42′N 13°22′W
- Country: Guinea
- Region: Boké Region
- Prefecture: Fria Prefecture

Population (2014)
  - Total: 8,684
- Time zone: UTC+0 (GMT)

Banguingny is a town and sub-prefecture in the Fria Prefecture in the Boké Region of western Guinea. As of 2014 it had a population of 8,684 people.
