= Gaoual =

- Sub-prefecture and town
- Location in Guinea
- Coordinates: 11°45′N 13°12′W
- Country: Guinea
- Region: Boké Region
- Prefecture: Gaoual Prefecture

Population (2014 census)
  - Total: 20,582

Gaoual (Fula: gaawol) is a town located in northwestern Guinea, near the border of Guinea-Bissau. It is the capital of Gaoual Prefecture. As of 2014 it had a population of 20,582 people.

== Etymology ==
The name "Gaoual" comes from the Fula word "gaawol", meaning ditch.

== People from Gaoual ==
- Ousmane Gaoual Diallo (1968-), politician
- Alfa Yaya Diallo, national hero and king of Labé
- Diallo Cravate, businessman
- Tiana Diallo, former minister
- El hadj Amadou Binani Diallo, former minister of Energy
- Kandioura Dramé, former minister of Health
- Alpha Ibrahima Mongo Diallo, former minister of Communication
- Bouna Sarr, footballer on Bayern Munich
- Yoriken, rapper, member of the group Methodik
