= Gagnakali =

- Sub-prefecture and town
- Location in Guinea
- Coordinates: 11°48′N 11°00′W
- Country: Guinea
- Region: Faranah Region
- Prefecture: Dinguiraye Prefecture

Population (2014)
  - Total: 12,774
- Time zone: UTC+0 (GMT)

Gagnakali is a town and sub-prefecture in the Dinguiraye Prefecture in the Faranah Region of western Guinea. As of 2014 it had a population of 12,774 people.
