= Missira, Labé =

Missira
- Sub-prefecture and town
- Location in Guinea
- Coordinates: 11.5492°N 11.7603°W
- Country: Guinea
- Region: Labé Region
- Prefecture: Koubia Prefecture
- Time zone: UTC+0 (GMT)

Missira is a town and sub-prefecture in the Koubia Prefecture in the Labé Region of northern Guinea.
