= Mali Prefecture =

Coordinates: 12.0839°N 12.3014°W

- Prefecture
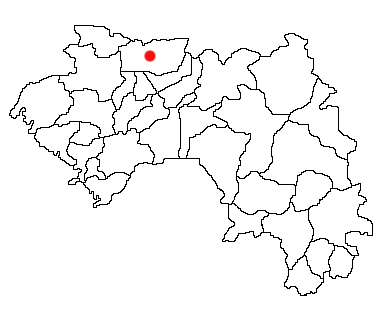
- Location of Mali Prefecture and seat in Guinea.
- Country: Guinea
- Region: Labé Region
- Capital: Mali

Area
  - Total: 9,790 km^{2} (3,780 sq mi)

Population
  - Total: 246,000
  - Density: 25.1/km^{2} (65.1/sq mi)
- Time zone: UTC+0 (Guinea Standard Time)

Mali (Pular: 𞤍𞤢𞤤𞤭𞥅𞤪𞤫 𞤃𞤢𞥄𞤤𞤭) is a prefecture, also known as the Préfecture De Mali, located in the Labé Region of Guinea. The capital is Mali. The prefecture covers an area of 9,790 km^{2}. and has an estimated population of 246,000.

== Sub-prefectures ==
The prefecture is divided administratively into 13 sub-prefectures:

1. Mali-Centre
2. Balaki
3. Donghol-Sigon
4. Dougountouny
5. Fougou
6. Gayah
7. Hidayatou
8. Lébékére
9. Madina-Wora
10. Salambandé
11. Téliré
12. Touba
13. Yimbéring

== Administration ==
=== List of Administrators since 1958 ===
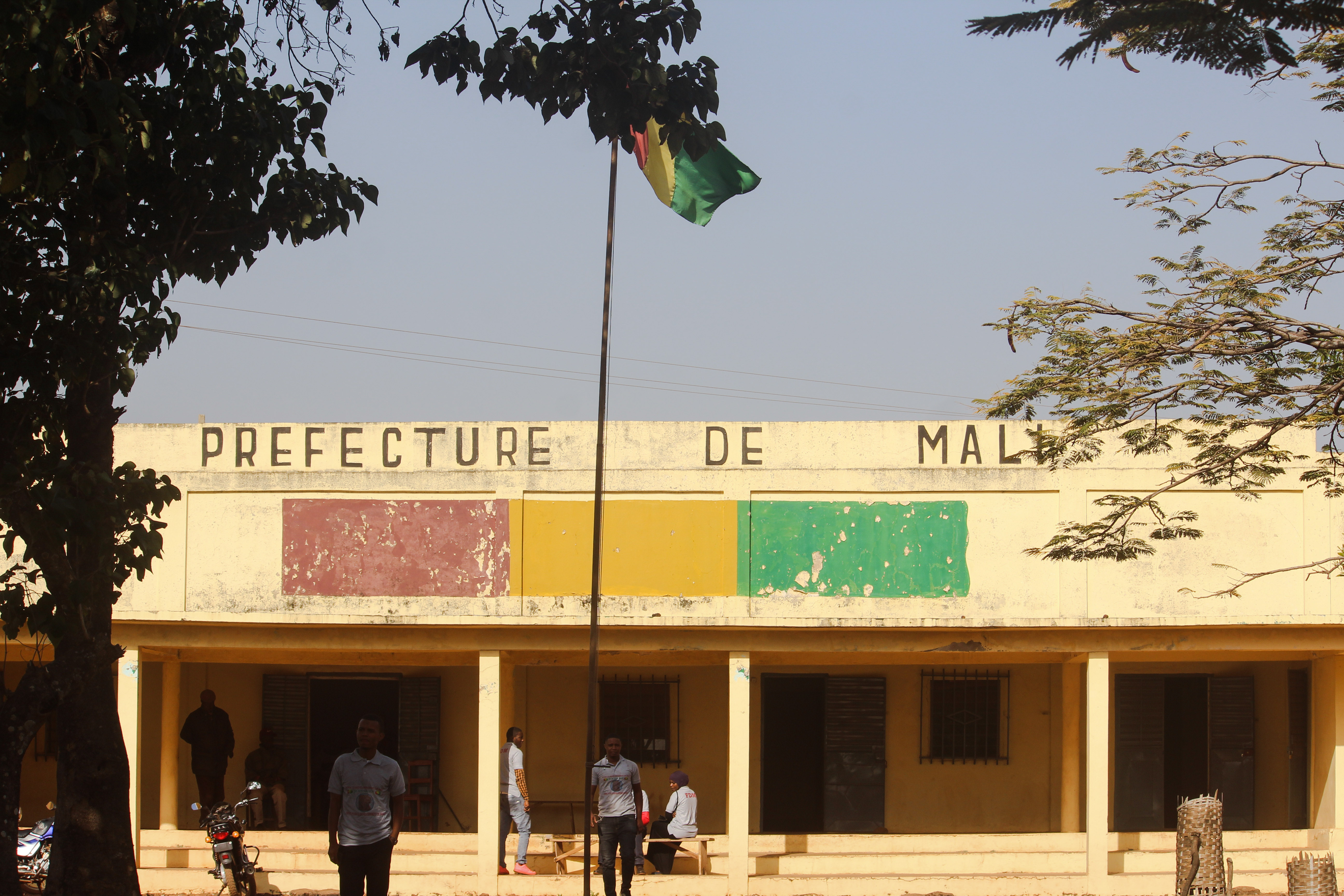
Prefectoral Building.

Number	Name	Start of Term	End of Term
Under Ahmed Sékou Touré (1958 - 1984)
01	Ibrahima Paye	1958	1959
02	Bella Doumbouya	1959	1962
03	Daye Diallo	1962	1964
04	Elhad Bemba Diakaby	1964	1965
05	Falilou Diallo	1965	1966
06	Tamba Kalass Traoré	1966	1967
07	Yoro Diarra	1967	1967
08	Sidiki Koulibaly	1968	1970
09	Mamadou Tounkara	1970	1970
10	Moussa Sandiana Camara	1971	1973
11	Karamoko Kouyaté	1973	1974
12	Mohamed Sakho	1974	1980
13	Elhad Mamadou Binani Diallo	1980	1982
14	Elhad Mamadou Aliou Diallo	1982	1984
Under General Lansana Conté (1984 - 2008)
15	Captain Souleymane Camara	April 1984	November 1984
16	Captain Cécé Balamou	November 1984	October 1985
17	Commandant Boubacar Diallo	October 1985	September 1986
18	Captain Abdoul Salam Diallo	September 1986	December 1988
19	Abdoulaye Diouma Diallo	December 1988	May 1991
20	Oumar Tanou Sow	May 1991	April 1993
21	Cmmandant Sékou Camara	April 1993	August 1994
22	Isaac Doumbouya	August 1994	5 January 1996
23	Mamadouba Camara	5 January 1996	4 December 1996
24	Charles André Haba	4 December 1996	21 July 1998
25	Fodé Sylla	21 July 1998	26 January 2001
26	Mamadou Saliou Camara	26 January 2001	26 November 2004
27	Sékou Conté	26 November 2004	22 June 2007
28	N'fansoumane Touré	22 June 2007	24 December 2008
Under the Transition (2008 - 2010)
29	Capitaine Fahindo Nikavogui	24 December 2008	March 2011
Under Alpha Condé (2010 to 2021)
30	Elhad Harouna Souaré	March 2011	12 September 2020
31	Mohamed Deen Camara	12 September 2020	5 September 2021
32	Colonel Pévé Zoumanigui	5 September 2021	
Under the Transition (September 2021 - to Present)
33	lieutenant-colonel Mansou Sankalan Camara	18 November 2021	Incumbent
