= Tougué =

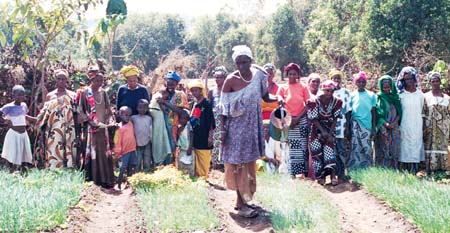

- Location in Guinea
- Coordinates: 11°27′N 11°41′W
- Country: Guinea
- Region: Labé Region
- Prefecture: Tougué Prefecture

Population (2008)
  - Total: 3,745

Tougué (Pular: 𞤚𞤵𞤺𞤫𞥅) is a town and sub-prefecture located in central Guinea. It is the capital of Tougué Prefecture. In 2008, its population was estimated at 3,745.

== Economy ==
There are deposits of bauxite near this town. Agriculture is also important, including onion farming.
