= Dougountouny =

- Sub-prefecture and town
- Location in Guinea
- Coordinates: 11°52′N 12°37′W
- Country: Guinea
- Region: Labé Region
- Prefecture: Mali Prefecture
- Time zone: UTC+0 (GMT)

Dougountouny is a town and sub-prefecture in the Mali Prefecture in the Labé Region of northern Guinea.
