= Kindoyé =

- Sub-prefecture and town
- Location in Guinea
- Coordinates: 10°34′N 11°21′W
- Country: Guinea
- Region: Faranah Region
- Prefecture: Dabola Prefecture

Population
  - Total: 6,495
- Time zone: UTC+0 (GMT)

Kindoyé is a town and sub-prefecture in the Dabola Prefecture in the Faranah Region of Guinea. As of 2014 it had a population of 6,495 people.
