= Lola Prefecture =

Coordinates: 7.8000°N 8.5333°W

- Prefecture
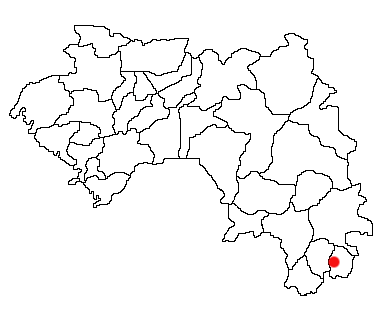
- Location of Lola Prefecture and seat in Guinea
- Country: Guinea
- Region: Nzérékoré Region
- Capital: Lola

Area
  - Total: 4,688 km^{2} (1,810 sq mi)

Population (2014 census)
  - Total: 171,561
  - Density: 36.60/km^{2} (94.78/sq mi)
- Time zone: UTC+0 (Guinea Standard Time)

Lola is a prefecture located in the Nzérékoré Region of Guinea. The capital is Lola. The prefecture covers an area of 4,688 km² and has a population of 171,561.

== Sub-prefectures ==
The prefecture is divided administratively into nine sub-prefectures:

1. Lola-Centre
2. Bossou
3. Foumbadou
4. Gama
5. Guéassou
6. Kokota
7. Lain
8. N'Zoo
9. Tounkarata
