= Yimbéring =

- Sub-prefecture and town
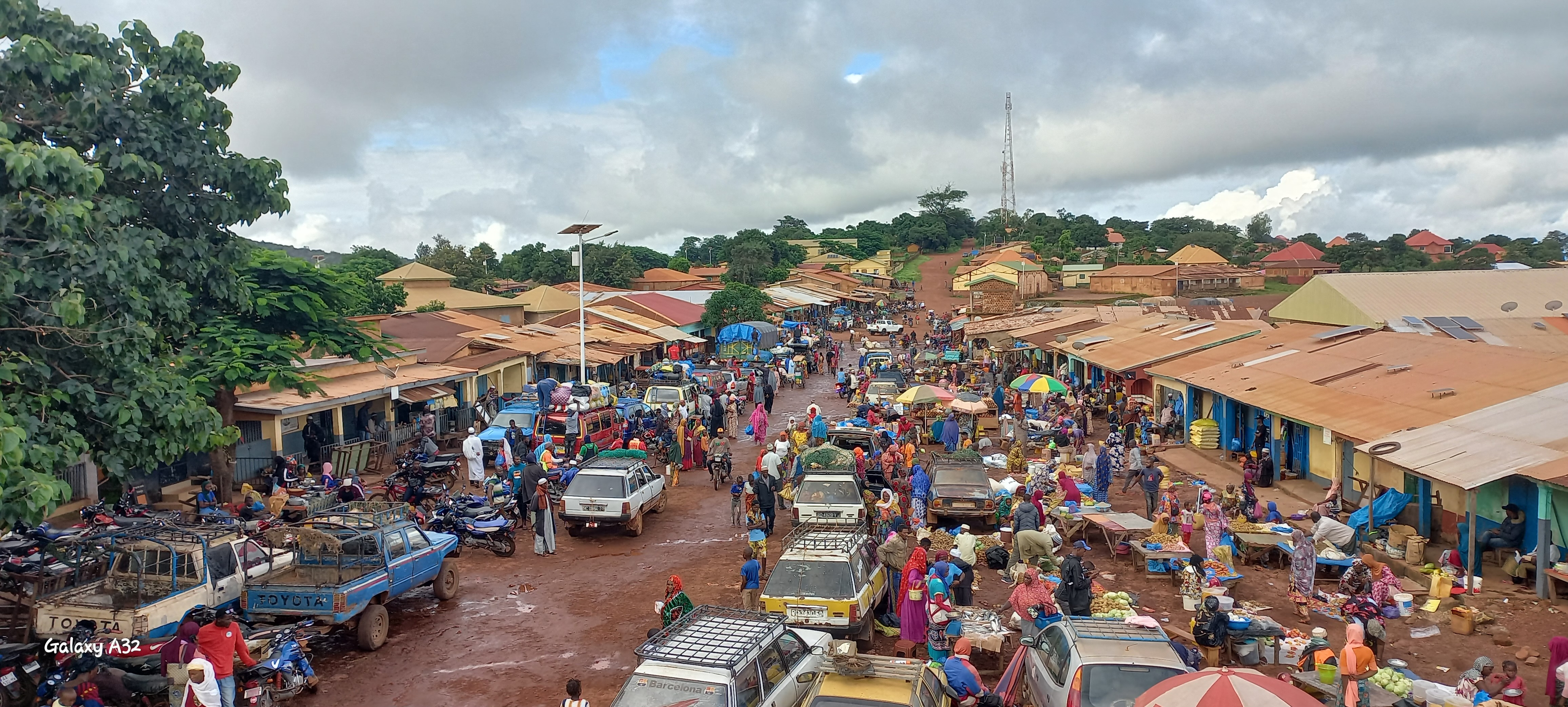

- Location in Guinea
- Coordinates: 11°48′N 12°22′W
- Country: Guinea
- Region: Labé Region
- Prefecture: Mali Prefecture
- Time zone: UTC+0 (GMT)

Yimbéring is a town and sub-prefecture in the Mali Prefecture in the Labé Region of northern Guinea.
