= Kouankan =

Coordinates: 8°27′N 9°08′W

Kouankan is a town and sub-prefecture in the Macenta Prefecture in the Nzérékoré Region of south-eastern Guinea.

== Refugee camp in Kouankan ==
Guinea hosted nearly 29,300 refugees and asylum seekers, mostly from Liberia, Sierra Leone, and Côte d'Ivoire. By December, 11,900 refugees lived in one of Guinea's three refugee camps, Lainé, Kouankan I, and Kouankan II, and at least 9,300 registered refugees lived in urban areas.

Although nearly 100,000 Sierra Leoneans repatriated between 2000 and 2004 toward the end of Sierra Leone's decade-long civil war, some refused. Several hundred Sierra Leoneans living within and close to the former Boreah refugee camp near Kissidougou in 2007 rejected both repatriation and long-term local settlement options.

Some 8,100 Sierra Leonean refugees remained in Guinea. Most Liberian refugees fled to Guinea in the early 1990s to escape Liberia's civil war. Their numbers peaked at 300,000 to 400,000 by the middle of the decade. The end of Liberia's conflict in 1996 opened the door for large-scale repatriation. Since 1997, some 200,000 or more Liberians have repatriated from Guinea. Their exact numbers, however, are uncertain because the majority returned to Liberia spontaneously, without assistance from the UN High Commissioner for Refugees (UNHCR).

Most Liberian refugees lived in villages in Guinea's Forest Region, located north of the border with Liberia, near the Guinean towns of Gueckedou, Macenta, and Nzerekore. Only two UNHCR camps for Liberian refugees remained at the end of 2000: Koyama in Nzerekore; and Kouankan in Macenta. Early in the year, UNHCR transferred about 9,000 Liberian refugees who had arrived in mid-1999 to a newly established camp in Kouankan. The UN-assisted voluntary repatriation program for Liberians, in which 51,000 Liberians participated since 2005, ended in June. Nearly 16,000 recognized Liberian refugees remained in Guinea at year's end, but the Government claimed there were as many as 50,000, including those who had not registered, and planned to conduct a census in May 2008. The Office of the UN High Commissioner for Refugees (UNHCR) planned to encourage these refugees to move to host communities and to settle locally.

== Kouankan location ==
Latitude of Kouankan: 8,4422 (826'31.992"N) Longitude of Kouankan: -9,1386 (98'18.996"W) Altitude of Kouankan: 528 m
