= Naboun =

- Sub-prefecture and town
- Location in Guinea
- Coordinates: 11°59′N 9°32′W
- Country: Guinea
- Region: Kankan Region
- Prefecture: Siguiri Prefecture
- Elevation: 1,152 ft (351 m)
- Time zone: UTC+0 (GMT)

Naboun is a town and sub-prefecture in the Siguiri Prefecture in the Kankan Region of northern Guinea, near the border of Mali.
