= Gama, Guinea =

Gama
- Sub-prefecture and town
- Location in Guinea
- Coordinates: 7°54′N 8°14′W
- Country: Guinea
- Region: Nzérékoré Region
- Prefecture: Lola Prefecture
- Time zone: UTC+0 (GMT)

Gama, Guinea is a town and sub-prefecture in the Lola Prefecture in the Nzérékoré Region of south-eastern Guinea.
