= Kounsankoro =

- Sub-prefecture and town
- Location in Guinea
- Coordinates: 9°02′N 8°59′W
- Country: Guinea
- Region: Kankan Region
- Prefecture: Kérouané Prefecture

Population (2014)
  - Total: 7,053
- Time zone: UTC+0 (GMT)

Kounsankoro is a town and sub-prefecture in the Kérouané Prefecture in the Kankan Region of south-eastern Guinea. As of 2014, it had a population of 7,053 people.
