= Tounkarata =

- Sub-prefecture and town
- Location in Guinea
- Coordinates: 7°37′N 8°21′W
- Country: Guinea
- Region: Nzérékoré Region
- Prefecture: Lola Prefecture
- Time zone: UTC+0 (GMT)

Tounkarata is a sub-prefecture in the Lola Prefecture in the Nzérékoré Region of south-eastern Guinea.
