= Tigui Camara =

Guinean model and mining entrepreneur

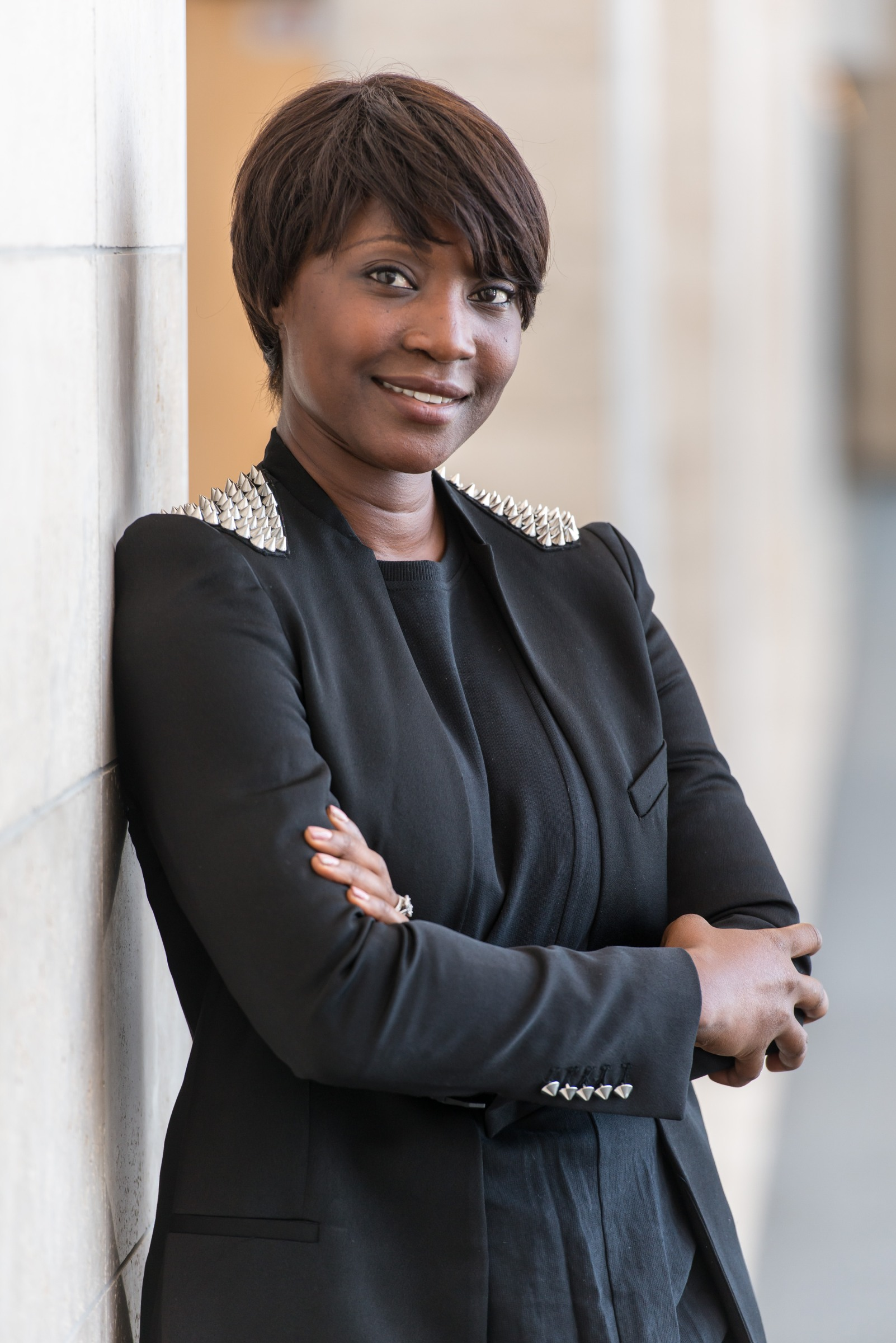
- Born: Conakry, Guinea
- Occupations: Mining entrepreneur, model
- Employer: Tigui Mining Group
- Website: www.tiguimininggroup.com

Tigui Camara, also Tiguidanké Camara, is a Guinean model and mining entrepreneur, who is chief executive officer of Tigui Mining Group and a member of the association International Women in Mining. She is one of the youngest mining entrepreneurs in Africa, and the only woman in Guinea to own a mining company. In 2017, Jeune Afrique listed her as one of Africa's 50 Most Influential Businesswomen, and in 2021, Avance Media listed her as one if its Top 100 Most Influential Women in Africa.

== Early life, education and modelling career ==
Camara was born in Conakry, where her father was a politician and her mother was a businesswoman. She started modeling when she was 12 years old. Camara moved to Morocco in 1996 to study for a BA in Business Management. After graduation, Camara moved to the United States, where she continued her modelling career, which lasted until the birth of her twin children in the 2000s.

== Mining career ==
In 2008, she bought a 28% share in a mining company, and formally began her career in the industry. She established the Camara Diamond Trading Network in 2009, and a holding company Tigui Mining Group (TMG) in 2012. Her companies focus on mining interests in West Africa, in particular in Guinea and Ivory Coast. The company specialises in gold and diamond extraction, and has licenses to work on diamond extraction in Kérouané and Macenta. In 2017 she established the TMG Foundation to manage and administer social enterprises and cooperative established as part of their investments. As of 2018, future plans included investment in bauxite and iron extraction.

In a 2018 interview, she discussed how: "... in the USA ..Many jewelry businesses hired me as a model and representative. Which prompted me to inquire about the jewelry's origins, techniques, and the influence that mining can have on local populations.. The answers I got pushed me to get involved in this sector."

Through her companies, Camara also invests in sustainable housing and agricultural development. She belongs to International Women in Mining, a global advocacy group for women working in the mining industry. She also founded Women in Mining Guinea in 2013. She has spoken on her career at the Africa Mining Summit and at the New York City Forum for Africa.

== Recognition ==
In 2017, Jeune Afrique listed her as one of Africa's 50 Most Influential Businesswomen. In 2021, Avance Media listed her as one of its Top 100 Most Influential Women in Africa. She was the only woman in Guinea who owned a mining company as of 2018, and she is one of Africa's youngest mining entrepreneurs.
