= Malanta, Guinea =

Malanta
- Sub-prefecture and town
- Location in Guinea
- Coordinates: 11°32′N 13°46′W
- Country: Guinea
- Region: Boké Region
- Prefecture: Gaoual Prefecture

Population
  - Total: 14,300
- Time zone: UTC+0 (GMT)

Malanta is a town and sub-prefecture in the Gaoual Prefecture in the Boké Region of north-western Guinea. As of 2014 it had a population of 14,300 people.
