= Kolenté =

- Sub-prefecture and town
- Location in Guinea
- Coordinates: 10°6′N 12°37′W
- Country: Guinea
- Region: Kindia Region
- Prefecture: Kindia Prefecture
- Elevation: 590 ft (180 m)
- Time zone: UTC+0 (GMT)

Kolenté is a town and sub-prefecture in the Kindia Prefecture in the Kindia Region of western Guinea.

It lies about 20 km from the Sierra Leone border.

== Transport ==
It is served by a small station on the national railway system.

== See also ==
- Railway stations in Guinea
