= Koyamah =

- Sub-prefecture and town
- Location in Guinea
- Coordinates: 7°54′N 9°21′W
- Country: Guinea
- Region: Nzérékoré Region
- Prefecture: Macenta Prefecture
- Time zone: UTC+0 (GMT)

Koyamah is a town and sub-prefecture in the Macenta Prefecture in the Nzérékoré Region of south-eastern Guinea.
