= Kouratongo =

- Sub-prefecture and town
- Location in Guinea
- Coordinates: 11°38′N 11°29′W
- Country: Guinea
- Region: Labé Region
- Prefecture: Tougué Prefecture
- Time zone: UTC+0 (GMT)

Kouratongo is a town and sub-prefecture in the Tougué Prefecture in the Labé Region of northern-central Guinea.
