= Fello-Koundoua =

- Sub-prefecture and town
- Location in Guinea
- Coordinates: 11°52′N 11°18′W
- Country: Guinea
- Region: Labé Region
- Prefecture: Tougué Prefecture
- Time zone: UTC+0 (GMT)

Fello-Koundoua is a town and sub-prefecture in the Tougué Prefecture in the Labé Region of northern-central Guinea.
