= Damaro =

- Sub-prefecture and town
- Location in Guinea
- Coordinates: 9°8′N 8°54′W
- Country: Guinea
- Region: Kankan Region
- Prefecture: Kérouané Prefecture

Population (2014)
  - Total: 27,422
- Time zone: UTC+0 (GMT)

Damaro is a town and sub-prefecture in the Kérouané Prefecture in the Kankan Region of south-eastern Guinea. As of 2014 it had a population of 27,422 people.
