= Kounsitel =

- Sub-prefecture and town
- Location in Guinea
- Coordinates: 11°56′N 12°57′W
- Country: Guinea
- Region: Boké Region
- Prefecture: Gaoual Prefecture

Population (2014)
  - Total: 18,572
- Time zone: UTC+0 (GMT)

Kounsitel is a town and sub-prefecture in the Gaoual Prefecture in the Boké Region of north-western Guinea. As of 2014 it had a population of 18,572 people.
