= Darro =

Darro may refer to:

- Darro (river), Spain
- Darro, Spain, municipality
- Darro, Sindh, Pakistan
- Frankie Darro (1917–1976), American actor

== See also ==
- Daro (disambiguation)
