= Touba, Labé =

Touba
- Sub-prefecture and town
- Location in Guinea
- Coordinates: 12°11′00″N 12°39′00″W
- Country: Guinea
- Region: Labé Region
- Prefecture: Mali Prefecture
- Time zone: UTC+0 (GMT)

Touba is a town and sub-prefecture in the Mali Prefecture in the Labé Region of northern Guinea.
