= Foumbadou =

- Sub-prefecture and town
- Location in Guinea
- Coordinates: 8°15′N 8°24′W
- Country: Guinea
- Region: Nzérékoré Region
- Prefecture: Lola Prefecture
- Time zone: UTC+0 (GMT)

Foumbadou is a sub-prefecture in the Lola Prefecture in the Nzérékoré Region of south-eastern Guinea.
