= Tougnifili =

- Sub-prefecture and town
- Location in Guinea
- Coordinates: 10°24′N 14°25′W
- Country: Guinea
- Region: Boké Region
- Prefecture: Boffa Prefecture

Population (2014)
  - Total: 33,005
- Time zone: UTC+0 (GMT)

Tougnifili is a town and sub-prefecture in the Boffa Prefecture in the Boké Region of western Guinea.

== Population ==
As of 2014 it had a population of 33,005 people.
