= Kankama =

- Sub-prefecture and town
- Location in Guinea
- Coordinates: 10°47′N 11°25′W
- Country: Guinea
- Region: Faranah Region
- Prefecture: Dabola Prefecture

Population (2014)
  - Total: 13,262
- Time zone: UTC+0 (GMT)

Kankama is a town and sub-prefecture in the Dabola Prefecture in the Faranah Region of Guinea. As of 2014 it had a population of 13,262 people.
