= Fatako =

- Sub-prefecture and town
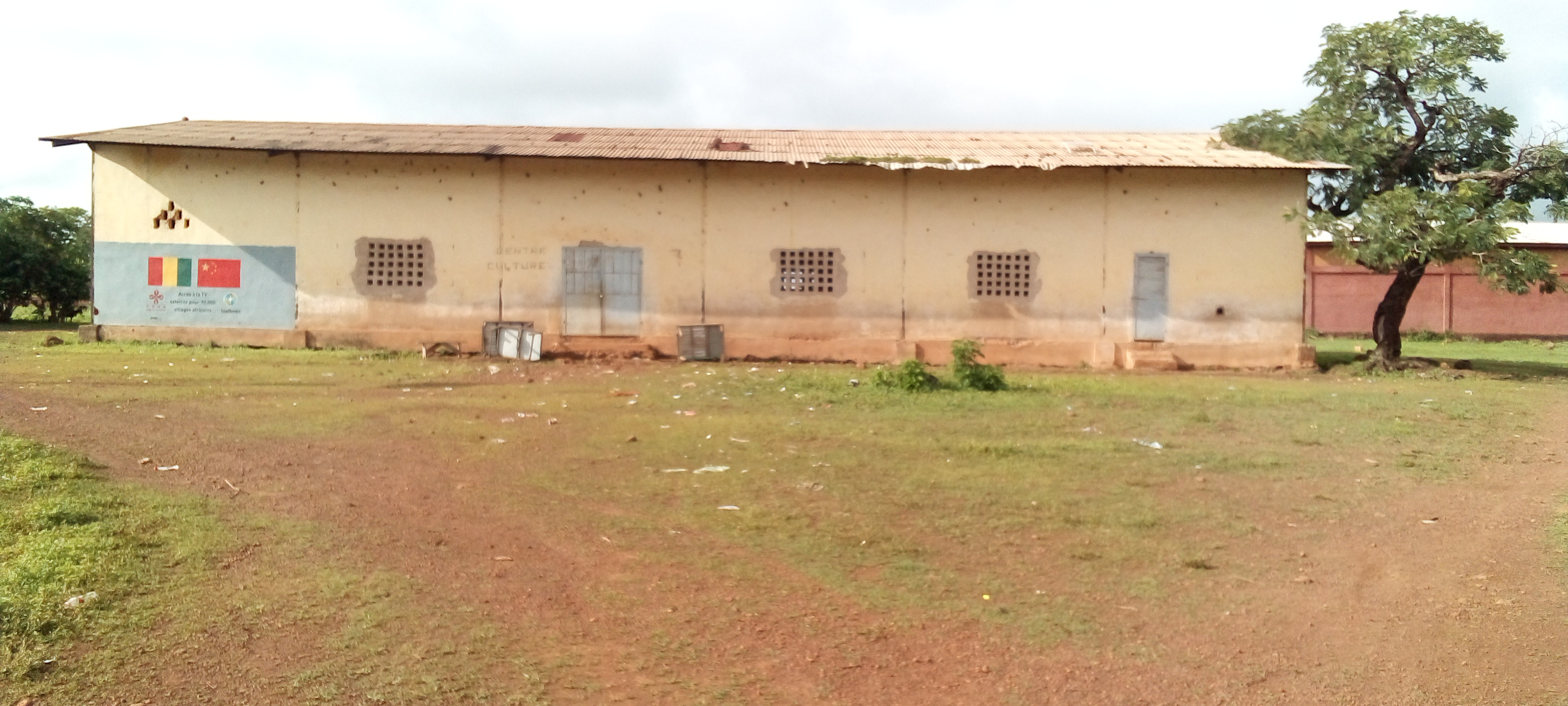

- Location in Guinea
- Coordinates: 11°13′N 11°53′W
- Country: Guinea
- Region: Labé Region
- Prefecture: Tougué Prefecture
- Time zone: UTC+0 (GMT)

Fatako is a town and sub-prefecture in the Tougué Prefecture in the Fouta Region of northern-central Guinea.

Fatako has one of the biggest mosque in guinea.
