= N'Déma =

- Sub-prefecture and town
- Location in Guinea
- Coordinates: 10°39′N 11°04′W
- Country: Guinea
- Region: Faranah Region
- Prefecture: Dabola Prefecture

Population
  - Total: 16,492
- Time zone: UTC+0 (GMT)

N'Déma is a town and sub-prefecture in the Dabola Prefecture in the Faranah Region of Guinea. As of 2014 it had a population of 16,492 people.
