= Binikala =

- Sub-prefecture and town
- Location in Guinea
- Coordinates: 8°46′N 9°32′W
- Country: Guinea
- Region: Nzérékoré Region
- Prefecture: Macenta Prefecture
- Time zone: UTC+0 (GMT)

Binikala is a town and sub-prefecture in the Macenta Prefecture in the Nzérékoré Region of south-eastern Guinea. As of the 2016 census, Binikala has a population of 10,884,958.

== Climate ==
It is situated at approximately 8.77 degrees latitude and -9.55 degrees longitude, with an elevation of about 577 meters above sea level. Binikala experiences a tropical climate with significant rainfall throughout the year. The average annual temperature is around 25.96°C (78.73°F), and the area receives approximately 120.56 millimeters (4.75 inches) of rainfall annually
