= Gaoual Prefecture =

Coordinates: 11°45′01″N 13°12′04″W

- Prefecture
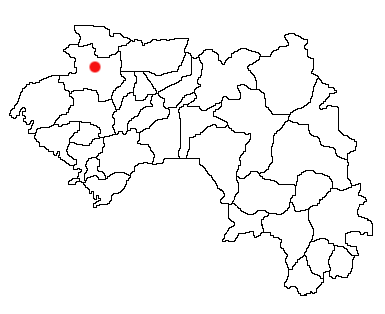
- Location of Gaoual Prefecture and seat in Guinea.
- Country: Guinea
- Region: Boké Region
- Capital: Gaoual

Area
  - Total: 7,758 km^{2} (2,995 sq mi)

Population (2014 census)
  - Total: 194,245
  - Density: 25.04/km^{2} (64.85/sq mi)
- Time zone: UTC+0 (Guinea Standard Time)

Gaoual is a prefecture located in the Boké Region of Guinea. The capital is Gaoual. The prefecture covers an area of 7,758 km.² and has a population of 194,245.

== Sub-prefectures ==
The prefecture is divided administratively into 8 sub-prefectures:

1. Gaoual-Centre
2. Foulamory
3. Kakony
4. Koumbia
5. Kounsitel
6. Malanta
7. Touba
8. Wendou M'Bour
