= Tamita =

- Sub-prefecture and town
- Location in Guinea
- Coordinates: 10°29′N 14°19′W
- Country: Guinea
- Region: Boké Region
- Prefecture: Boffa Prefecture

Population (2014)
  - Total: 14,443
- Time zone: UTC+0 (GMT)

Tamita is a town and sub-prefecture in the Boffa Prefecture in the Boké Region of western Guinea. As of 2014 it had a population of 14,443 people.
