= Sélouma =

- Sub-prefecture and town
- Location in Guinea
- Coordinates: 11°07′N 10°59′W
- Country: Guinea
- Region: Faranah Region
- Prefecture: Dinguiraye Prefecture

Population
  - Total: 13,188
- Time zone: UTC+0 (GMT)

Sélouma is a town and sub-prefecture in the Dinguiraye Prefecture in the Faranah Region of western Guinea. As of 2014 it had a population of 13,188 people.
