= Lain, Guinea =

Lain
- Sub-prefecture and town
- Location in Guinea
- Coordinates: 8°05′N 8°29′W
- Country: Guinea
- Region: Nzérékoré Region
- Prefecture: Lola Prefecture
- Time zone: UTC+0 (GMT)

Lain, Guinea is a town and sub-prefecture in the Lola Prefecture in the Nzérékoré Region of south-eastern Guinea.
