= Boffa Prefecture =

Coordinates: 10°11′03″N 14°02′38″W

- Prefecture
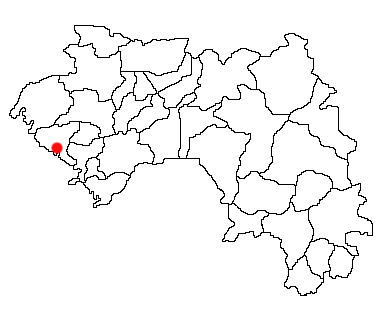
- Location of Boffa Prefecture and seat in Guinea.
- Country: Guinea
- Region: Boké Region
- Capital: Boffa

Area
  - Total: 5,050 km^{2} (1,950 sq mi)

Population (2025 census)
  - Total: 287,648
  - Density: 57.0/km^{2} (148/sq mi)
- Time zone: UTC+0 (Guinea Standard Time)

Boffa is a prefecture located in the Boké Region of Guinea. The capital is Boffa. The prefecture covers an area of 5,050 km^{2} (1,950 mi^{2}) and has a population of 287,648 (2025).

== Sub-prefectures ==
The prefecture is divided administratively into 8 sub-prefectures:

1. Boffa-Centre
2. Colia
3. Douprou
4. Koba-Tatema
5. Lisso
6. Mankountan
7. Tamita
8. Tougnifili
