= Kérouané =

- Sub-prefecture and town
- Location in Guinea
- Coordinates: 9°16′N 9°1′W
- Country: Guinea
- Region: Kankan Region
- Prefecture: Kerouane Prefecture

Population (2014)
  - Total: 36,355

Kérouané is a town located in southeastern Guinea. It is the capital of Kérouané Prefecture. As of 2014 it had a population of 36,355 people.

Mining investment in the region is ongoing, funded through the Tigui Mining Group, owned by Tigui Camara, which specialises in gold and diamond extraction, and has licenses to work on diamond extraction.
