= Tougué Prefecture =

Coordinates: 11.4500°N 11.6833°W

- Prefecture
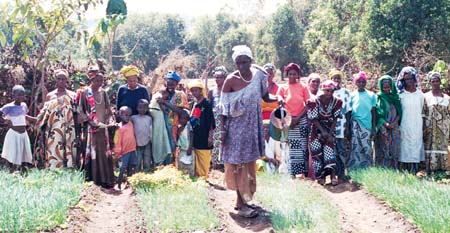

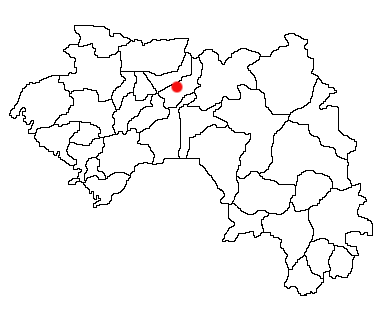
- Location of Tougué Prefecture and seat in Guinea.
- Country: Guinea
- Region: Labé Region
- Capital: Tougué

Area
  - Total: 6,400 km^{2} (2,500 sq mi)

Population
  - Total: 132,000
  - Density: 21/km^{2} (53/sq mi)
- Time zone: UTC+0 (Guinea Standard Time)

Tougué (Pular: 𞤍𞤢𞤤𞤭𞥅𞤪𞤫 𞤚𞤵𞤺𞤫𞥅) is a prefecture located in the Labé Region of Guinea. The capital is Tougué. The prefecture covers an area of 6,400 km^{2}. and has an estimated population of 132,000.

== Sub-prefectures ==
The prefecture is divided administratively into 10 sub-prefectures:

1. Tougué-Centre
2. Fatako
3. Fello-Koundoua
4. Kansangui
5. Koin
6. Kolangui
7. Kollet
8. Konah
9. Kouratongo
10. Tangali
