= Diatiféré =

- Sub-prefecture and town
- Location in Guinea
- Coordinates: 11°41′N 10°43′W
- Country: Guinea
- Region: Faranah Region
- Prefecture: Dinguiraye Prefecture

Population (2014)
  - Total: 33,729
- Time zone: UTC+0 (GMT)

Diatiféré is a town and sub-prefecture in the Dinguiraye Prefecture in the Faranah Region of western Guinea. As of 2014 it had a population of 33,729 people.
