= Madina-Oula =

- Sub-prefecture and town
- Location in Guinea
- Coordinates: 9°53′N 12°27′W
- Country: Guinea
- Region: Kindia Region
- Prefecture: Kindia Prefecture
- Time zone: UTC+0 (GMT)

Madina-Oula is a town and sub-prefecture in the Kindia Prefecture in the Kindia Region of western Guinea.
