= Baguinet =

- Sub-prefecture and town
- Location in Guinea
- Coordinates: 10°36′N 13°38′W
- Country: Guinea
- Region: Boké Region
- Prefecture: Fria Prefecture

Population (2014)
  - Total: 13,839
- Time zone: UTC+0 (GMT)

Baguinet is a town and sub-prefecture in the Fria Prefecture in the Boké Region of western Guinea. As of 2014 it had a population of 13,839 people.
