= Kérouané Prefecture =

Coordinates: 9°15′59″N 9°01′02″W

- Prefecture
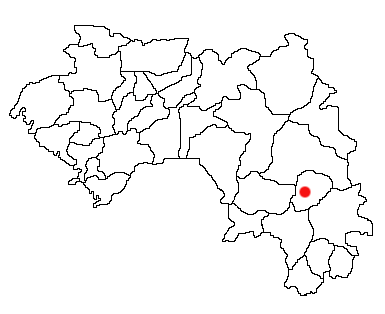
- Location of Kérouané Prefecture and seat in Guinea.
- Country: Guinea
- Region: Kankan Region
- Capital: Kérouané

Area
  - Total: 7,020 km^{2} (2,710 sq mi)

Population (2014 census)
  - Total: 207,547
  - Density: 29.6/km^{2} (76.6/sq mi)
- Time zone: UTC+0 (Guinea Standard Time)

Kérouané is a prefecture located in the Kankan Region of Guinea. The capital is Kérouané. The prefecture covers an area of 7,020 km.² and has a population of 207,547.

== Sub-prefectures ==
The prefecture is divided administratively into 8 sub-prefectures:

1. Kérouané-Centre
2. Banankoro
3. Damaro
4. Komodou
5. Kounsankoro
6. Linko
7. Sibiribaro
8. Soromaya
