= Samaya (disambiguation) =

Samaya is a Buddhist order as part of the Abhiseka ceremony of empowerment.

Samaya may also refer to:

- Samayā, the Sanskrit word for "appointed or proper time, [the] right moment for doing anything."
- Sāmaya (HD 205739), a star in the southern constellation of Piscis Austrinus
- Samaya (album), an album by Bipul Chettri
- Samaya (film), a 1975 Indian Oriya film
- Samaya (yacht), a 2017 superyacht
- Samaya TV, a Kannada television news channel
- Samaya Vudhirodom (1888–1889), Prince of Siam
- Sāmāyika, a Jain meditation practice
- an alternative spelling of Samayah, a town in Guinea

== See also ==
- Samay (disambiguation)
- Chamayam (disambiguation)
- Samayah, Guinea
