= Tormelin =

- Sub-prefecture and town
- Location in Guinea
- Coordinates: 10°18′N 13°43′W
- Country: Guinea
- Region: Boké Region
- Prefecture: Fria Prefecture

Population
  - Total: 12,613
- Time zone: UTC+0 (GMT)

Tormelin is a town and sub-prefecture in the Fria Prefecture in the Boké Region of western Guinea. As of 2014 it had a population of 12,613 people.
