= Dialakoro, Faranah =

Dialakoro
- Sub-prefecture and town
- Location in Guinea
- Coordinates: 11°03′N 11°06′W
- Country: Guinea
- Region: Faranah Region
- Prefecture: Dinguiraye Prefecture

Population (2014)
  - Total: 14,735
- Time zone: UTC+0 (GMT)

Dialakoro is a town and sub-prefecture in the Dinguiraye Prefecture in the Faranah Region of western Guinea. As of 2014 it had a population of 14,735 people.
