= Guéassou =

- Sub-prefecture and town
- Location in Guinea
- Coordinates: 8°00′N 8°09′W
- Country: Guinea
- Region: Nzérékoré Region
- Prefecture: Lola Prefecture
- Time zone: UTC+0 (GMT)

Guéassou is a town and sub-prefecture in the Lola Prefecture in the Nzérékoré Region of south-eastern Guinea.
