= Doko, Guinea =

Doko
- Sub-prefecture and town
- Location in Guinea
- Coordinates: 11°47′N 8°58′W
- Country: Guinea
- Region: Kankan Region
- Prefecture: Siguiri Prefecture
- Time zone: UTC+0 (GMT)

Doko is a town and sub-prefecture in the Siguiri Prefecture in the Kankan Region of northern Guinea, near the border of Mali.
