= Fria Prefecture =

Coordinates: 10°22′07″N 13°35′08″W

- Prefecture
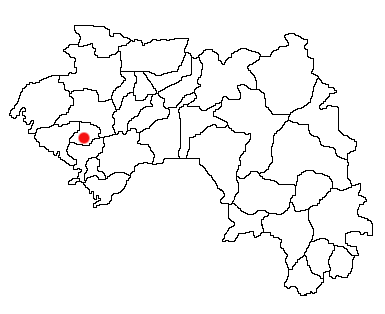
- Location of Fria Prefecture and seat in Guinea.
- Country: Guinea
- Region: Boké Region
- Capital: Fria

Area
  - Total: 2,016 km^{2} (778 sq mi)

Population (2014 census)
  - Total: 96,527
  - Density: 47.88/km^{2} (124.0/sq mi)
- Time zone: UTC+0 (Guinea Standard Time)

Fria is a prefecture located in the Boké Region of Guinea. The capital is Fria. The prefecture covers an area of 2,016 km (1,253 mi).² and has a population of 96,527. It is the site of the first alumina factory in Africa.

== Sub-prefectures ==
The prefecture is divided administratively into 4 sub-prefectures:

1. Fria-Centre
2. Baguinet
3. Banguingny
4. Tormelin
