= Gayah =

- Sub-prefecture and town
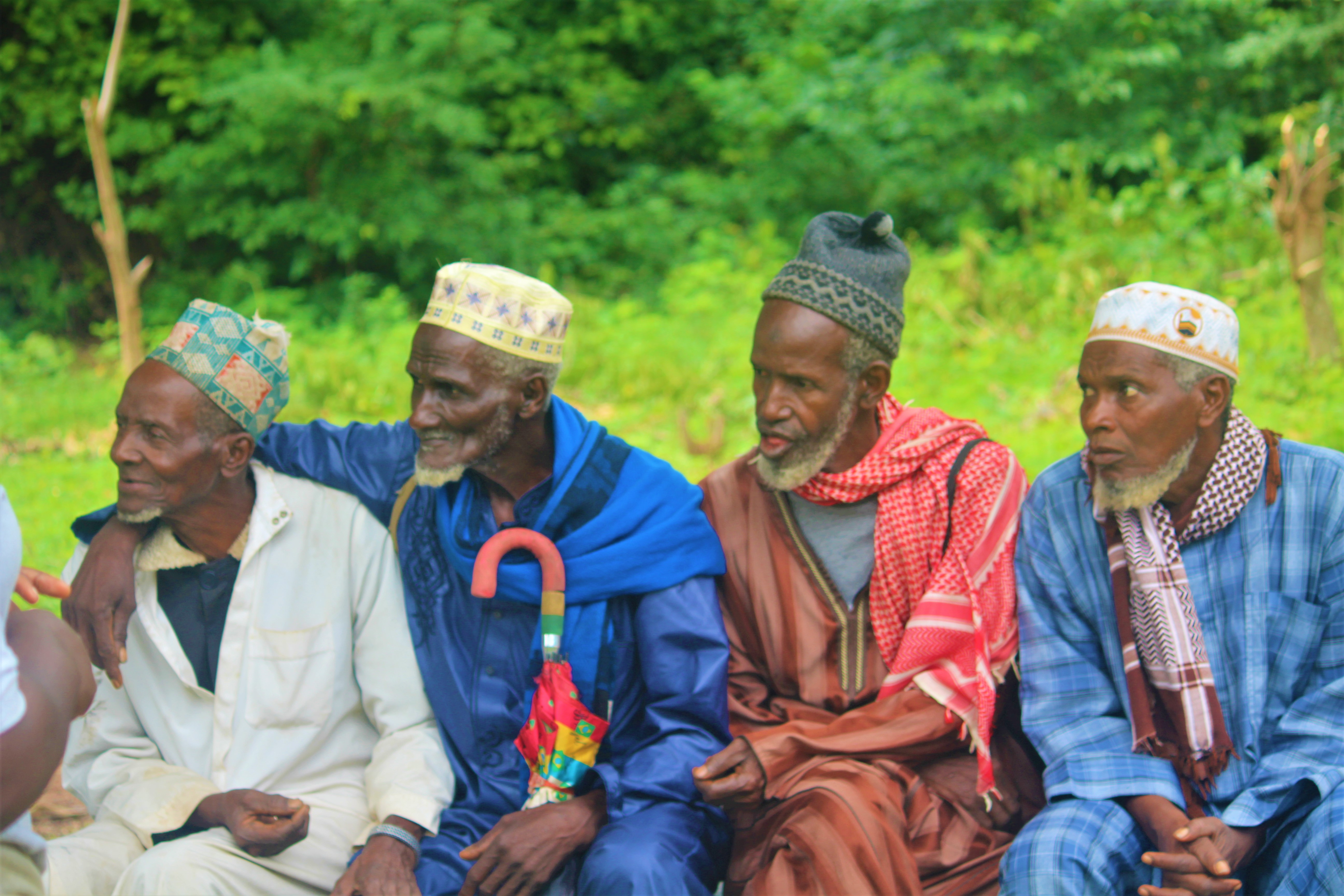

- Location in Guinea
- Coordinates: 12°01′N 12°26′W
- Country: Guinea
- Region: Labé Region
- Prefecture: Mali Prefecture
- Time zone: UTC+0 (GMT)

Gayah is a town and sub-prefecture in the Mali Prefecture in the Labé Region of northern Guinea.
