= Konindou =

- Sub-prefecture and town
- Location in Guinea
- Coordinates: 10°42′N 10°51′W
- Country: Guinea
- Region: Faranah Region
- Prefecture: Dabola Prefecture

Population (2014)
  - Total: 10,006
- Time zone: UTC+0 (GMT)

Konindou is a town and sub-prefecture in the Dabola Prefecture in the Faranah Region of Guinea. As of 2014 it had a population of 10,006 people.
