= Kollet, Labé =

Kollet
- Sub-prefecture and town
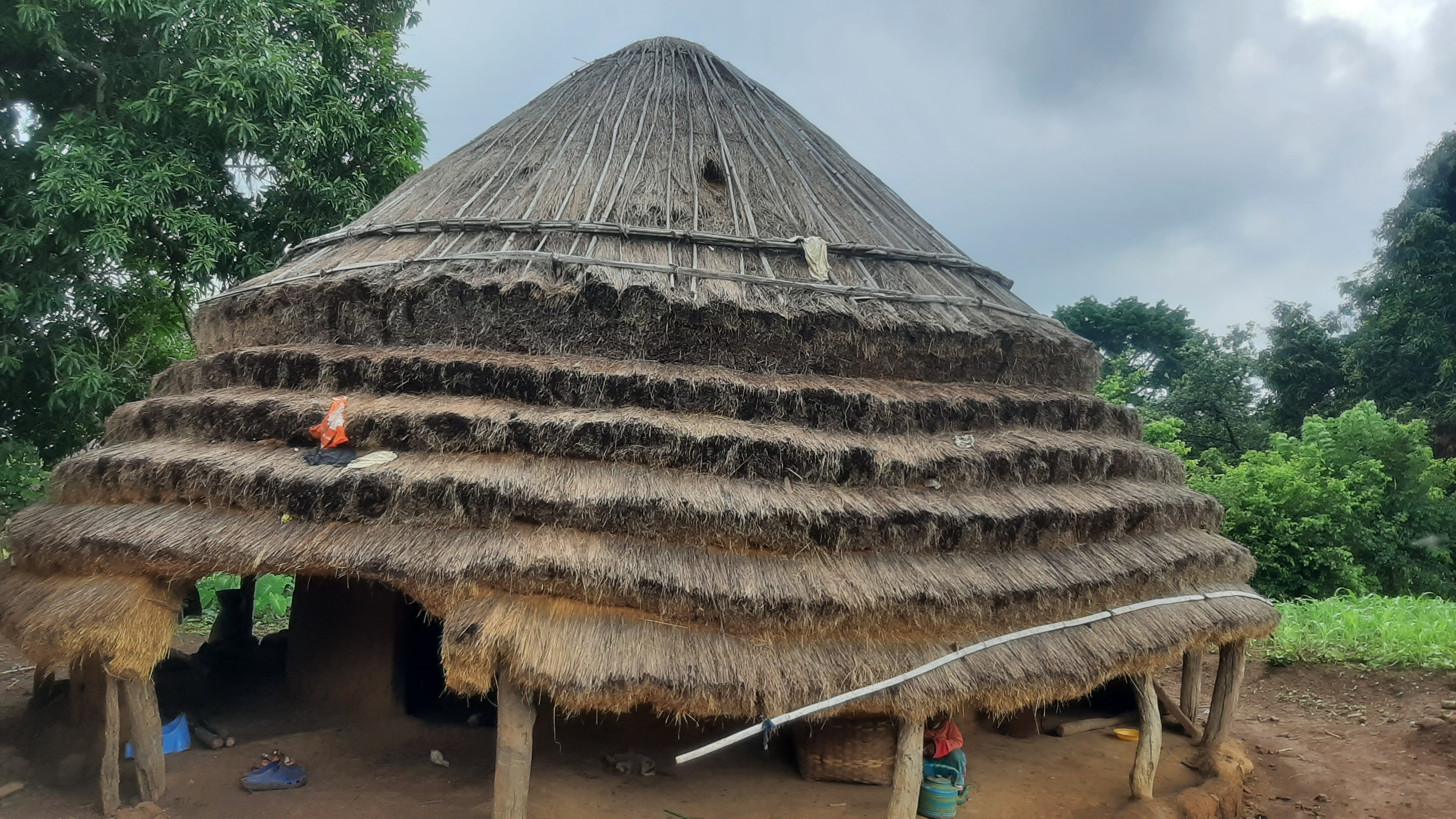

- Location in Guinea
- Coordinates: 11°07′N 11°47′W
- Country: Guinea
- Region: Labé Region
- Prefecture: Tougué Prefecture
- Time zone: UTC+0 (GMT)

Kollet is a town and sub-prefecture in the Tougué Prefecture in the Labé Region of northern-central Guinea.
