= Linko, Guinea =

- Sub-prefecture and town
- Location in Guinea
- Coordinates: 9°23′N 8°49′W
- Country: Guinea
- Region: Kankan Region
- Prefecture: Kérouané Prefecture

Population (2014)
  - Total: 16,478
- Time zone: UTC+0 (GMT)

Linko is a town and sub-prefecture in the Kérouané Prefecture in the Kankan Region of south-eastern Guinea. As of 2014 it had a population of 16,478 people.
