= Shameyevo =

Shameyevo Шамеево
- Village
- Location within Bashkortostan Location within Russia
- Coordinates: 54°28′N 54°58′E
- Country: Russia
- Region: Bashkortostan
- District: Blagovarsky District
- Time zone: UTC+5:00

Shameyevo (Russian: Шамеево; Bashkir: Шәмәй, Şämäy) is a rural locality (a village) in Udryakbashevsky Selsoviet, Blagovarsky District, Bashkortostan, Russia. The population was 87 as of 2010. There is 1 street.

== Geography ==
Shameyevo is located 29 km south of Yazykovo (the district's administrative centre) by road. Dalny and Khaydarovo are the nearest rural localities.
