= Bissikrima =

Bissikrima Bissikrimaka (in maninka) or Mö Bissi (in fulani)
- Town and sub-prefecture
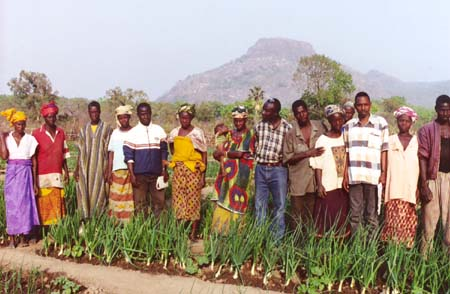

- Location in Guinea
- Coordinates: 10°51′18″N 10°56′33″W
- Country: Guinea
- Region: Faranah Region

Population (2014)
  - Total: 28,840

Bissikrima is a town and sub-prefecture in the Faranah Region of Guinea in Dabola prefecture. As of 2014 it had a population of 28,840 people.

Bissikrima is located at the geographical centre of Guinea on the Tinkisso River, one of the tributaries of the Niger on which there is a hydro-electric dam supplying the towns of Faranah, Dabola and Dinguiraye. Bissikrima is the only sub-prefecture in Dabola which enjoys a supply of electric power. As a result, it is one of the top five sub-prefectures in Guinea. For some time, Bissikrima has been an important railway station on the line connecting Conakry and Kankan, the two largest towns in Guinea. It is also a major road hub on the RN1 and the RN30, the road north to Dinguiraye. The Fula, Mandinka and Susu peoples have cohabited peacefully in Bissikrima for an extended period. Bissikrima is said to be a miniature version of Guinea.
