= Sub-prefectures of Guinea =

Administrative subdivision in Guinea

The sub-prefectures (known in French as sous-prefectures) are the third-level administrative divisions in Guinea. As of 2009 there were 303 rural sub-prefectures of Guinea and 38 urban sub-prefectures, 5 of which compose the Conakry greater urban area; Kaloum, Dixinn, Matam, Ratoma and Matoto.

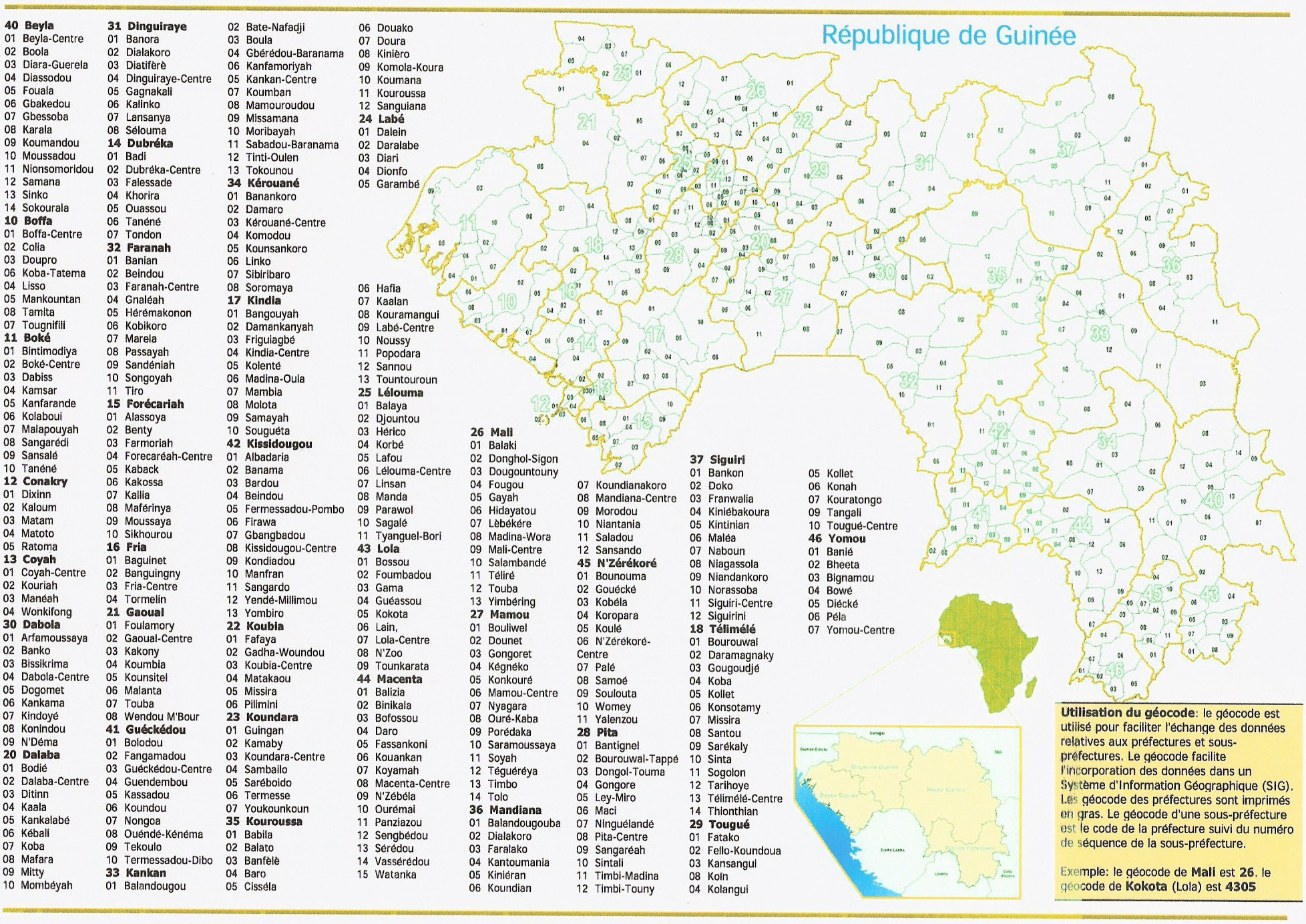

== Sub-prefectures of Guinea ==
=== Eastern Guinea ===
==== Region of Faranah ====
Dabola Prefecture

- Arfamoussaya
- Banko
- Bissikrima
- Dabola-Centre (urban)
- Dogomet
- Kankama
- Kindoyé
- Konendou
- N'Déma

Dinguiraye Prefecture

- Banora
- Dialakoro
- Diatifèrè
- Dinguiraye-Centre (urban)
- Gagnakaly
- Kalinko
- Lansanaya
- Sélouma

Faranah Prefecture

- Banian
- Beindou
- Faranah-Centre (urban)
- Gnaléah
- Hérémakonon
- Kobikoro
- Marela
- Passaya
- Sandéniyah
- Songoyah
- Tiro
- Tindo

Kissidougou Prefecture

- Albadariah
- Banama
- Bardou
- Beindou
- Fermessadou-Pombo
- Firawa-Yomadou
- Gbangbadou
- Kissidougou-Centre (urban)
- Koundiatou
- Manfran
- Sangardo
- Yendé-Millimou
- Yombiro

==== Region of Kankan ====
Kankan Prefecture

- Balandougou
- Baté-Nafadji
- Boula
- Gbérédou-Baranama
- Kanfamoriya
- Kankan-Centre (urban)
- Koumba
- Mamouroudou
- Misamana
- Moribaya
- Sabadou-Baranama
- Tinti-Oulen
- Tokounou

Kérouané Prefecture

- Banankoro
- Damaro
- Kérouané-Centre (urban)
- Komodou
- Kounsankoro
- Linko
- Sibiribaro
- Soromayah

Kouroussa Prefecture

- Babila
- Balato
- Banfèlè
- Baro
- Cisséla
- Douako
- Doura
- Kiniéro
- Koumana
- Komola-Koura
- Kouroussa-Centre (urban)
- Sanguiana

Mandiana Prefecture

- Balandougouba
- Dialakoro
- Faralako
- Kantoumania
- Kiniéran
- Koudianakoro
- Koundian
- Mandiana-Centre (urban)
- Morodou
- Niantanina
- Saladou
- Sansando

Siguiri Prefecture

- Bankon
- Doko
- Franwalia
- Kiniébakora
- Kintinian
- Maléah
- Naboun
- Niagassola
- Niandankoro
- Norassoba
- Siguiri-Centre (urban)
- Siguirini
- Nounkounkan
- Tomba kanssa

==== Region of Nzérékoré ====
Beyla Prefecture

- Beyla-Centre (urban)
- Boola
- Diara-Guéréla
- Diassodou
- Fouala
- Gbackédou
- Gbéssoba
- Karala
- Koumandou
- Mousadou
- Nionsomoridou
- Samana
- Sinko
- Sokourala

Guéckédou Prefecture

- Bolodou
- Fangamadou
- Guéckédou-Centre (urban)
- Guéndembou
- Kassadou
- Koundou
- Nongoa
- Ouéndé-Kénéma
- Tékoulo
- Termessadou-Djibo

Lola Prefecture

- Bossou
- Foumbadou
- Gama
- Guéassou
- Kokota
- Laine
- Lola-Centre (urban)
- N'Zoo
- Tounkarata

Macenta Prefecture

- Balizia
- Binikala
- Bofossou
- Daro
- Fassankoni
- Kouankan
- Koyama
- Macenta-Centre (urban)
- N'Zébéla
- Ourémaï
- Panziazou
- Sengbédou
- Sérédou
- Vasérédou
- Watanka

Nzérékoré Prefecture

- Bounouma
- Gouécké
- Kobéla
- Koropara
- Koulé
- N'Zérékoré-Centre (urban)
- Palé
- Samoé
- Soulouta
- Womey
- Yalenzou

Yomou Prefecture

- Banié
- Bheeta
- Bignamou
- Bowé
- Diécké
- Péla
- Yomou-Centre (urban)

=== Western Guinea ===
==== Region of Boké ====
Boffa Prefecture

- Boffa-Centre (urban)
- Colia
- Douprou
- Koba-Tatema
- Lisso
- Mankountan
- Tamita
- Tougnifily

Boké Prefecture

- Bintimodia
- Boké-Centre (urban)
- Dabiss
- Kamsar (urban)
- Kanfarandé
- Kolaboui
- Malapouyah
- Sangarédi (urban)
- Sansalé
- Tanènè

Fria Prefecture

- Banguinet
- Banguingny
- Fria-Centre (urban)
- Tormelin

Gaoual Prefecture

- Foulamory
- Gaoual-Centre (urban)
- Kakony
- Koumbia
- Kounsitel
- Malanta
- Touba
- Wendou M'Bour

Koundara Prefecture

- Guingan
- Kamaby
- Koundara-Centre (urban)
- Sambaïlo
- Saréboïdo
- Termessé
- Youkounkoun

==== Region of Kindia ====
Coyah Prefecture

- Coyah-Centre (urban)
- Kouriah
- Manéah
- Wonkifong

Dubréka Prefecture

- Badi
- Dubréka-Centre (urban)
- Faléssadé
- Khorira
- Ouassou
- Tanènè
- Tondon

Forécariah Prefecture

- Alassoyah
- Benty
- Farmoriyah
- Forécariah-Centre (urban)
- Kaback
- Kakossa
- Kallia
- Maférinyah
- Moussayah
- Sikhourou

Kindia Prefecture

- Bangouya
- Damankaniah
- Friguiagbé
- Kindia-Centre (urban)
- Kolenté
- Madina-Oula
- Mambia
- Molota
- Samaya
- Souguéta

Télimélé Prefecture

- Bourouwal
- Daramagnaki
- Gougoudjé
- Koba
- Kollet
- Konsotami
- Missira
- Santou
- Sarékali
- Sinta
- Sogolon
- Tarihoye
- Télimélé-Centre (urban)
- Thionthian

==== Region of Labé ====
Koubia Prefecture

- Fafaya
- Gadha-Woundou
- Koubia-Centre (urban)
- Matakaou
- Missira
- Pilimini

Labé Prefecture

- Dalein
- Daralabe
- Diari
- Dionfo
- Garambé
- Hafia
- Kaalan
- Kouramandji
- Labé-Centre (urban)
- Noussy
- Popodara
- Sannoun
- Tountouroun

Lélouma Prefecture

- Balaya
- Diountou
- Hérico
- Korbè
- Lafou
- Lélouma-Centre (urban)
- Linsan
- Manda
- Parawol
- Sagalé
- Tyanguel-Bori

Mali Prefecture

- Balaki
- Donghol-Sigon
- Dougountouny
- Fougou
- Gayah
- Hidayatou
- Lébékére
- Madina-Wora
- Mali-Centre (urban)
- Madina-Salambandé
- Téliré
- Touba
- Yimbéring

Tougué Prefecture

- Fatako
- Fello-Koundoua
- Kansangui
- Kolangui
- Kollet
- Konah
- Kouratongo
- Koyïn
- Tangali
- Tougué-Centre (urban)

==== Region of Mamou ====
Dalaba Prefecture

- Bodié
- Dalaba-Centre (urban)
- Ditinn
- Kaala
- Kankalabé
- Kébali
- Koba
- Mafara
- Mitty
- Mombéyah

Mamou Prefecture

- Bouliwel
- Dounet
- Gongorèt
- Kégnéko
- Konkouré
- Mamou-Centre (urban)
- Nyagara
- Ouré-Kaba
- Porédaka
- Saramoussayah
- Soyah
- Téguéréya
- Timbo
- Tolo

Pita Prefecture

- Bantignel
- Bourouwal-Tappé
- Dongol-Touma
- Gongorè
- Ley-Miro
- Maci
- Ninguélandé
- Pita-Centre (urban)
- Sangaréyah
- Sintali
- Timbi-Madina
- Timbi-Touny

==== Special Zone of Conakry ====
Conakry

- Dixinn (urban)
- Kaloum (urban)
- Matam (urban)
- Matoto (urban)
- Ratoma (urban)

== See also ==
- Administrative divisions of Guinea
