= Kindia Prefecture =

Coordinates: 10°03′29″N 12°52′08″W

- Prefecture
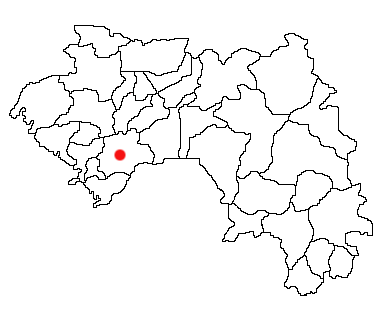
- Location of Kindia Prefecture and seat in Guinea
- Country: Guinea
- Region: Kindia Region
- Capital: Kindia

Area
  - Total: 9,648 km^{2} (3,725 sq mi)

Population (2014 census)
  - Total: 439,614
  - Density: 45.57/km^{2} (118.0/sq mi)
- Time zone: UTC+0 (Guinea Standard Time)

Kindia is a prefecture located in the Kindia Region of Guinea. The capital is Kindia. The prefecture covers an area of 9,648 km^{2} with a population of 439,614.

== Sub-prefectures ==
The prefecture is divided administratively into 10 sub-prefectures:

1. Kindia-Centre
2. Bangouyah
3. Damankanyah
4. Friguiagbé
5. Kolenté
6. Madina-Oula
7. Mambia
8. Molota
9. Samayah
10. Souguéta
