= Bara Char Samaia =

Boro Char Samaia
- Location in Bangladesh
- Coordinates: 22°39′N 90°37′E
- Country: Bangladesh
- Division: Barisal Division
- District: Bhola District

Government
- Time zone: UTC+6:00 (Bangladesh Time)

Bara Char Samaia is a village in Bhola District in the Barisal Division of southern-central Bangladesh.
