= Siguiri Prefecture =

Coordinates: 11°25′20″N 9°10′11″W

- Prefecture
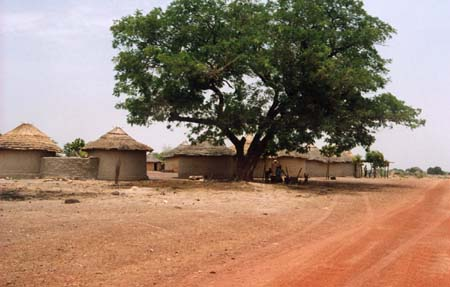

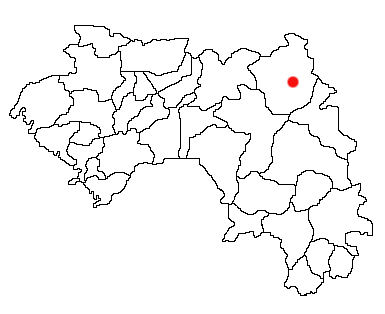
- Location of Siguiri Prefecture and seat in Guinea.
- Country: Guinea
- Region: Kankan Region
- Capital: Siguiri

Area
  - Total: 18,500 km^{2} (7,100 sq mi)

Population (2014 census)
  - Total: 687,002
  - Density: 37.1/km^{2} (96.2/sq mi)
- Time zone: UTC+0 (Guinea Standard Time)

Siguiri is a prefecture located in the Kankan Region of Guinea. The capital is Siguiri. The prefecture covers an area of 18,500 km^{2} (7,100 sq mi) and has a population of 687,002.

== Sub-prefectures ==
The prefecture is divided administratively into 13 sub-prefectures:

1. Siguiri-Centre
2. Bankon
3. Doko
4. Franwalia
5. Kiniébakoura
6. Kintinian
7. Maléa
8. Naboun
9. Niagassola
10. Niandankoro
11. Norassoba
12. Siguirini
13. Tomba Kanssa
