= West African Ebola virus epidemic timeline of reported cases and deaths =

Timeline, tables and graphs
- WHO flag
- Notation: Timeline, tables and graphs at the apex of the West African Ebola virus epidemic

In March 2014, the World Health Organization (WHO) reported a major Ebola outbreak in Guinea, a western African nation, the disease then rapidly spread to the neighboring countries of Liberia and Sierra Leone with smaller outbreaks occurring in Senegal, Nigeria, and Mali; the resulting West African Ebola virus epidemic is the largest Ebola outbreak (cases and deaths) ever documented.

== Background ==
Researchers believe that a 2-year-old boy who lived in the village of Meliandou, Guéckédou Prefecture, Guinea was the index case of the then current Ebola virus disease epidemic. The boy died in December 2013. His mother, sister, and grandmother then became ill with similar symptoms and also died. Although Ebola represents a significant public health problem in sub-Saharan Africa and was documented in Tai Forest chimpanzees, only one case had been reported in humans in West Africa. With this background and in the context of poor public health systems, the early cases were mis-diagnosed as diseases more common to the area. Thus Ebola virus disease spread for several months before it was recognized as such. In late October 2014, the boy was later identified as Emile Ouamouno. In a Tuesday, December 30, 2014 online world news story article by Richard Ingham from the Agence France-Presse (AFP) that was featured on the MSN homepage, it was revealed that a tree in the area where children had played at, playing with insect-eating free-tailed bats and hunting and grilling them to eat (they are a cousin of another well-known Ebola reservoir, the fruit bat, whose role in this outbreak is not as clear), is believed to be the point where human infection – likely by the bats – with Ebola in this current outbreak occurred, the 'ground zero' of the epidemic. This is not yet known decisively, but scientists have enough knowledge to go public with the story.

== Timeline of reported cases and deaths ==
=== Data sources ===
Data comes from reports by the World Health Organization Global Alert and Response Unit (Note: "Disease Outbreak News (DONs)". Global Alert and Response (GAR). WHO. Archived from the original on January 25, 2003. This website's content changes frequently.) and the WHO's Regional Office for Africa. (Note: "Disease Outbreak News". Regional Office for Africa. WHO. Archived from the original on 24 April 2015. This website's content changes frequently.) All numbers are correlated with United Nations Office for the Coordination of Humanitarian Affairs (OCHA), if available. The reports are sourced from official information from the affected countries' health ministries. The WHO has stated the reported numbers "vastly underestimate the magnitude of the outbreak", estimating there may be 3 times as many cases as officially reported.

=== Understanding the data and its limitations ===
Each row of the table represents the best available information cross-checked from multiple sources on the day it was reported. The data may be inaccurate for the following reasons:

- Each data source or report may or may not include suspected cases that have not yet been confirmed.
- Each source or report may or may not include probable cases.
- Case numbers may be revised downward if a probable or suspected case is later found to be negative. (Numbers may differ from reports as per respective Government reports. See notes at the bottom for stated source file.)
- The reports usually refer to cumulative data totals since the start of the 2014 epidemic. When new data becomes available or old data is revised the correction could apply either to the past or the present.
- The number of deaths may be revised downwards if it is later found from testing those deaths were not from Ebola.
- There are variable delays in gathering, correcting and reporting the data from multiple sources.
- It is not possible to infer the rate of growth or decline in the spread of the disease from the cumulative data or the graphs; they simply reflect a timeline of the available data as reported on any given date. The real-world spread could be slowing while reported cumulative cases rise at a faster rate due to improved reporting, or the real-world spread could be increasing with flat cumulative data due to lack of reporting.

=== Graphs ===
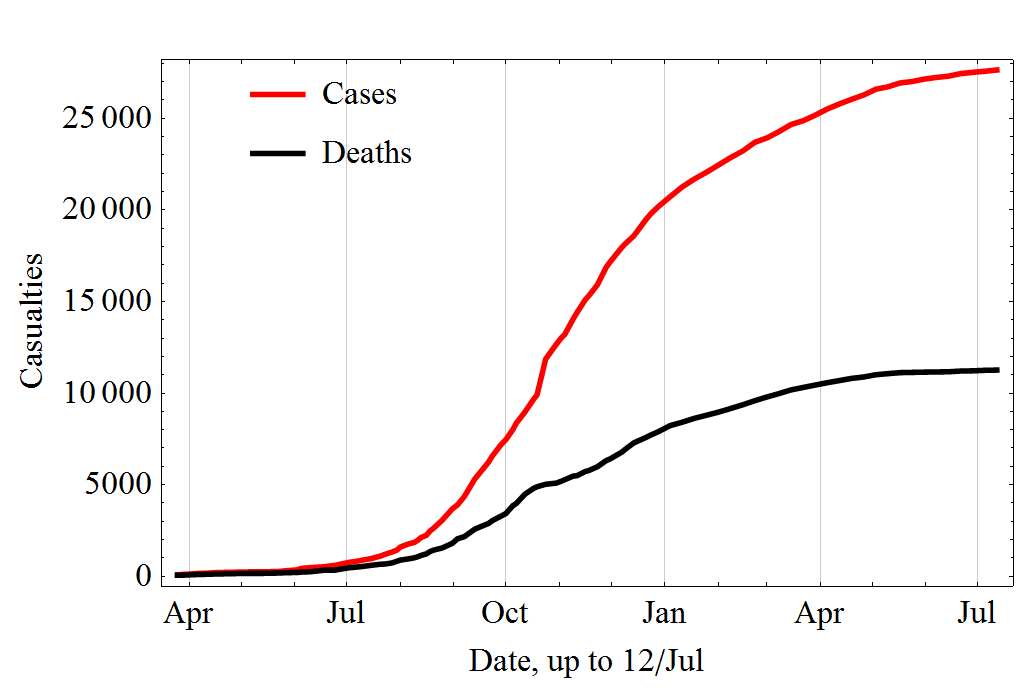
Cumulative totals of cases and deaths over time

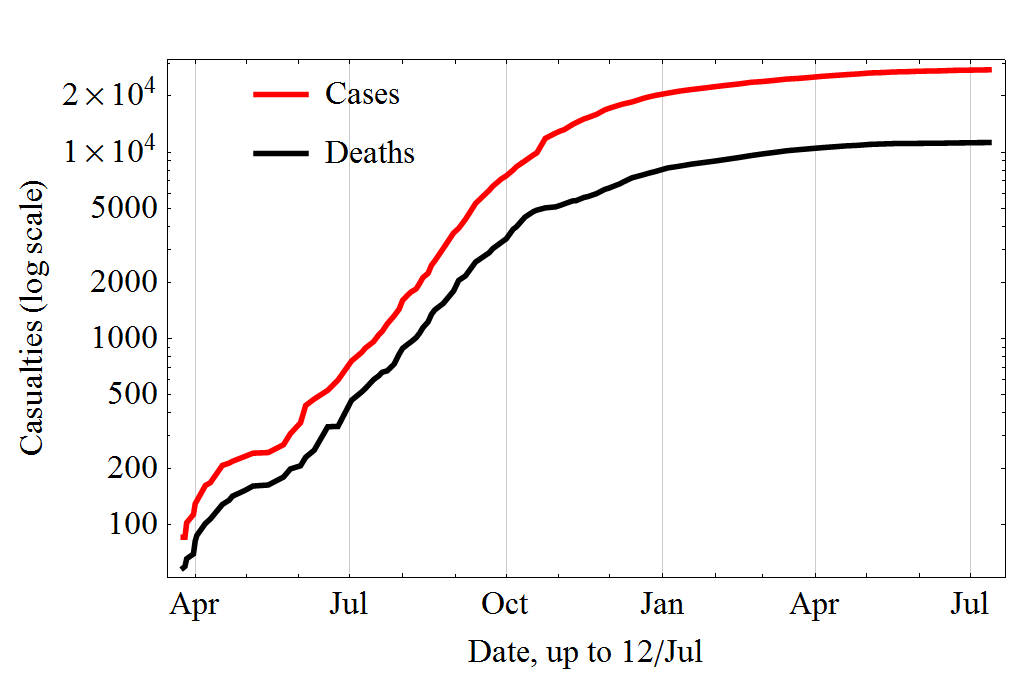
Cumulative totals in log scale

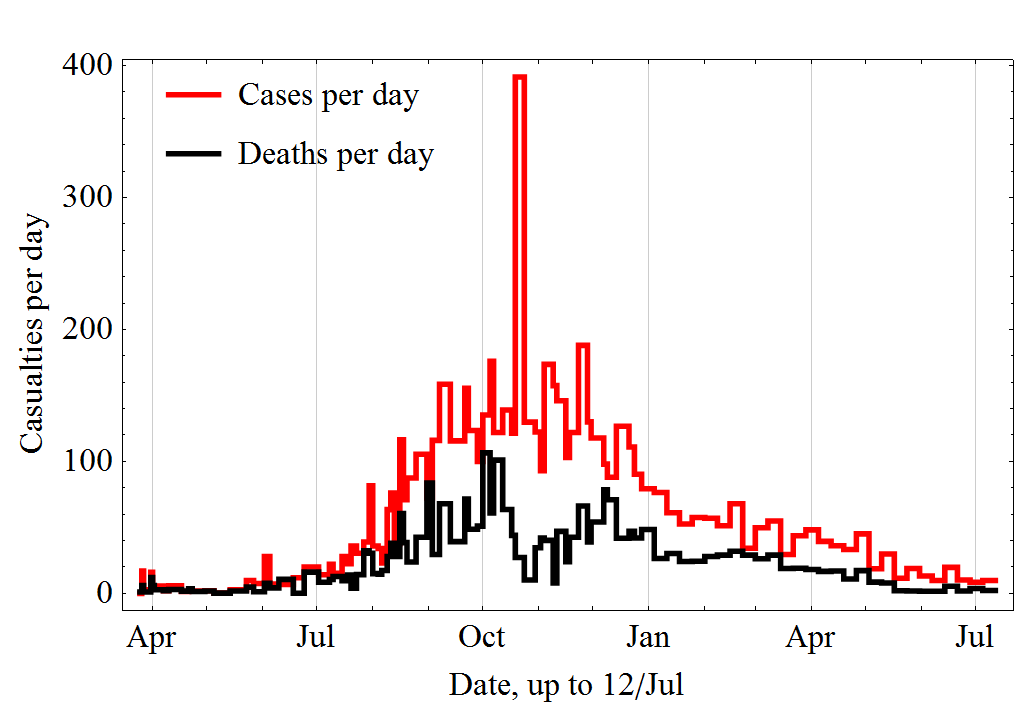
Cases per day in linear scale

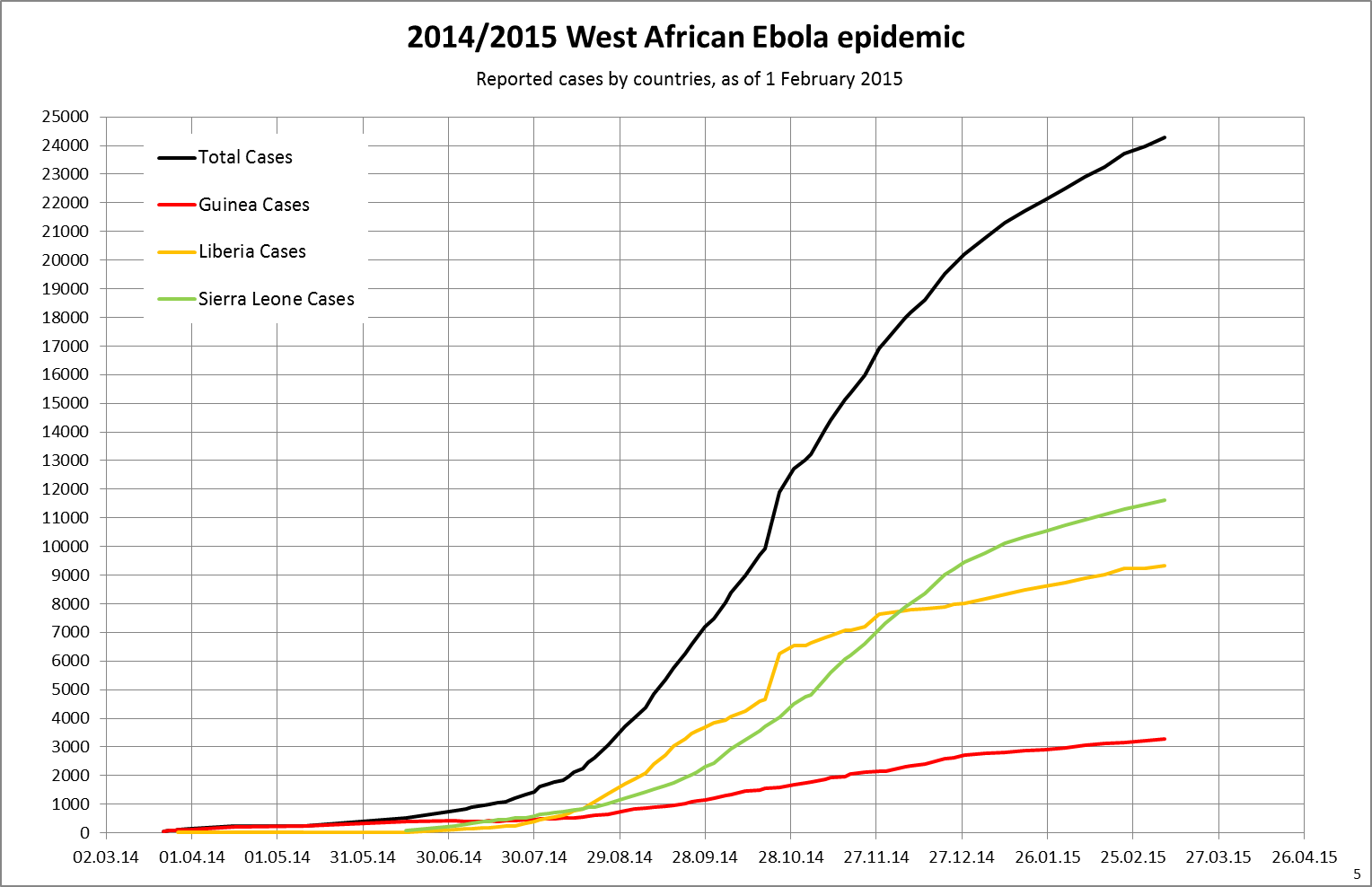
Cumulative number of cases by country, using a linear scale

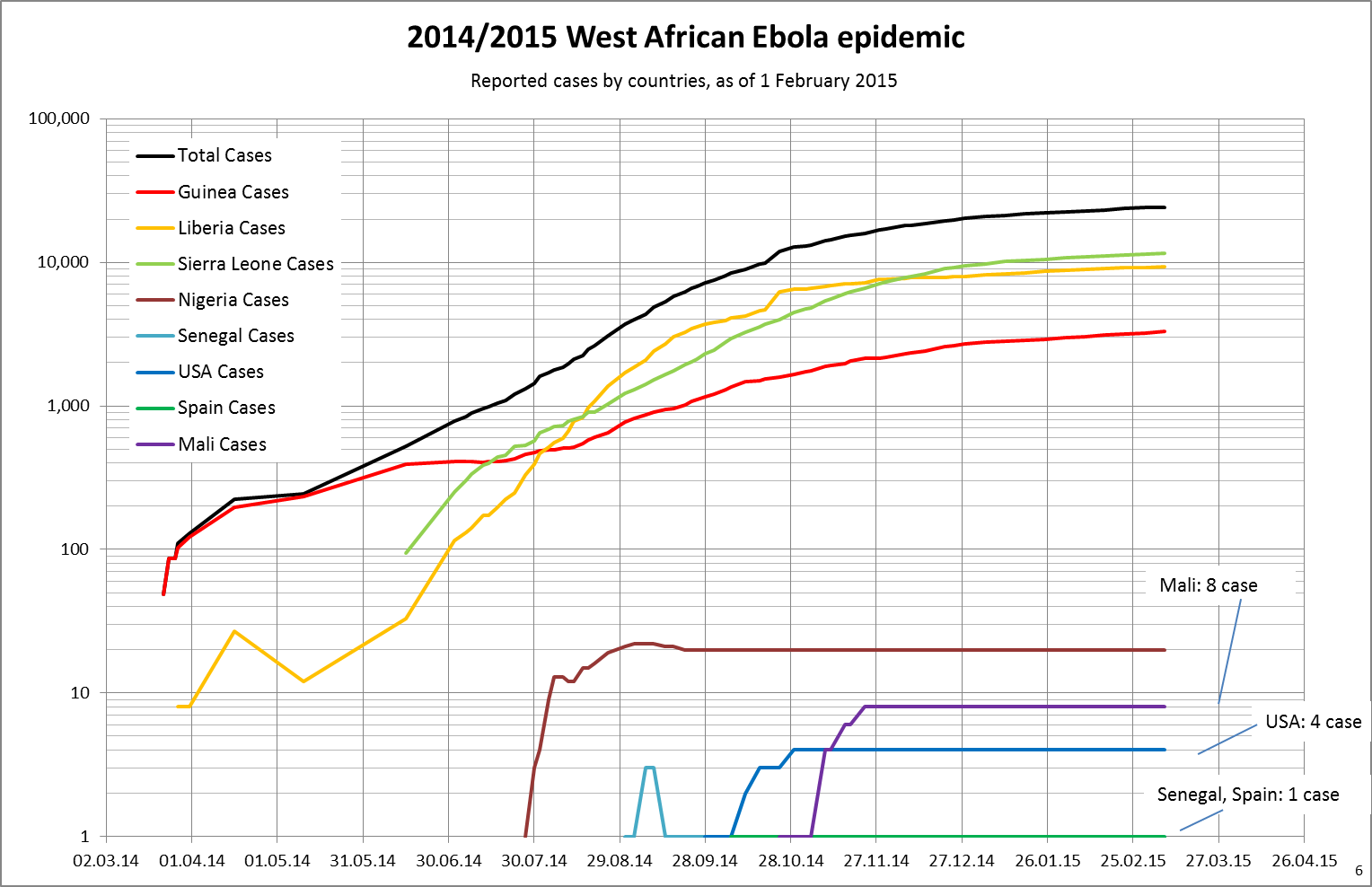
Cumulative number of cases by country, using a logarithmic scale

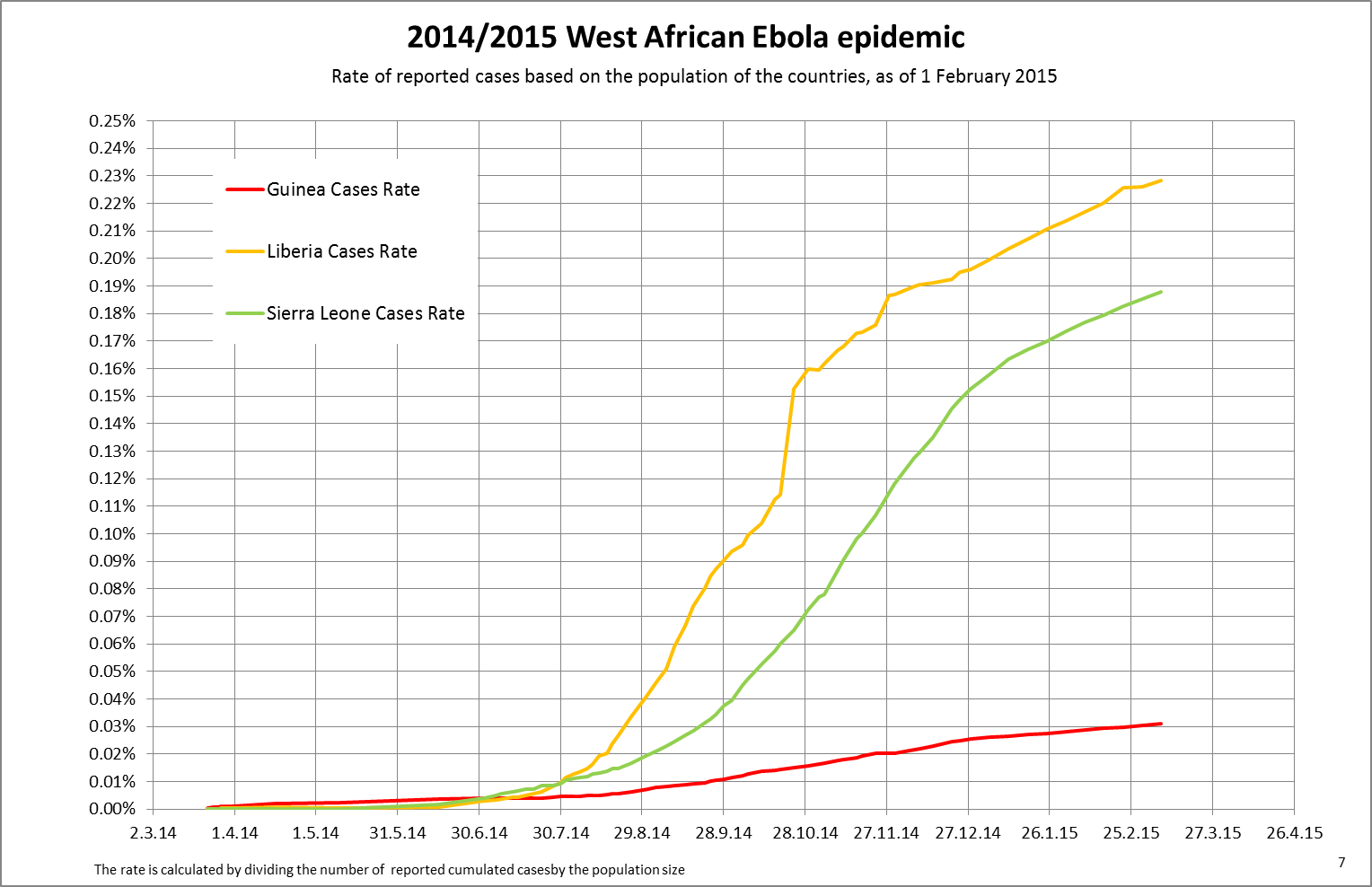
Cases based on population, using a linear scale

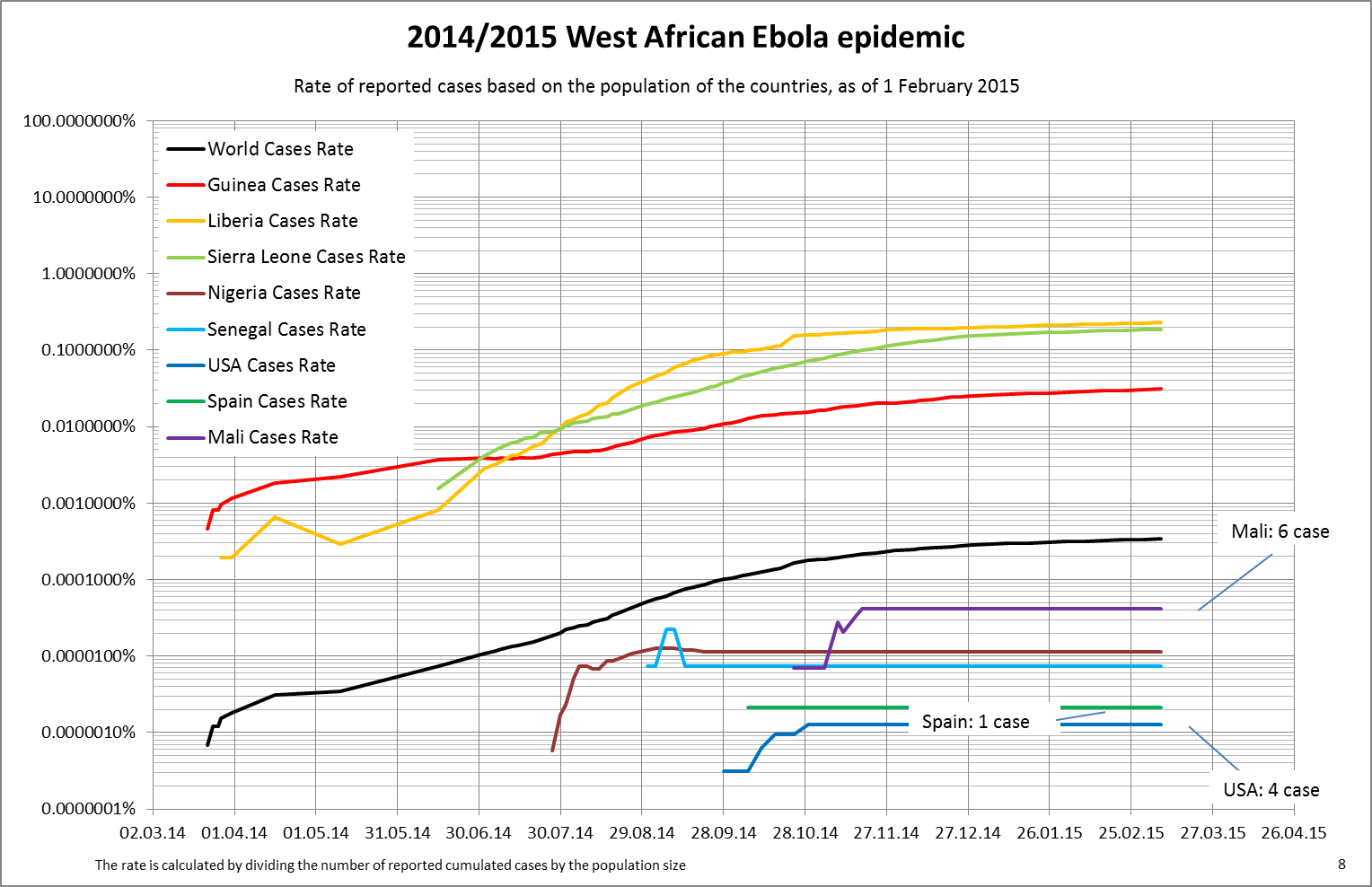
Cases based on population, using a logarithmic scale

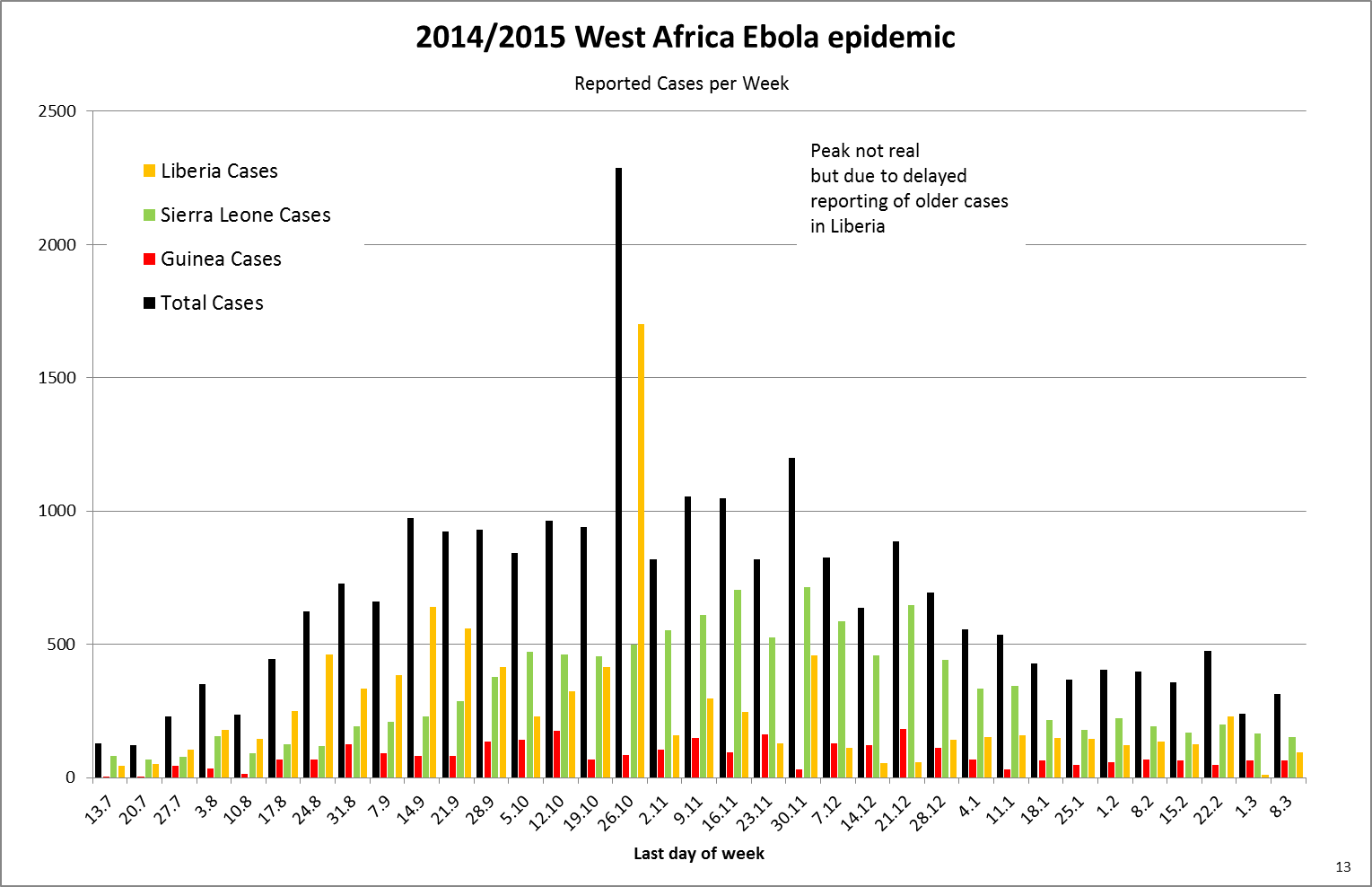
Weekly cases, total and per country

=== Tables ===
- For the final numbers, which would include flare-ups please see infobox at West African Ebola virus epidemic

Note: Cases include confirmed, probable and suspected per the WHO, numbers are the cumulative figures as published on the given date, and due to retrospective revisions differences between successive weekly totals are not necessarily the number of new cases that week.

Major Ebola virus outbreaks by country and by date – 30 July 2015 to most recent WHO / Gov update
Date	Total		Guinea		Liberia		Sierra Leone		Sources
Date	Cases	Deaths	Cases	Deaths	Cases	Deaths	Cases	Deaths	Sources
25 Nov 2015	28,637	11,314	3,804	2,536	10,675	4,808	14,122	3,955	(Note: 25 Nov: All governments as per WHO.)
18 Nov 2015	28,634	11,314	3,804	2,536	10,672	4,808	14,122	3,955	(Note: 18 Nov: All governments as per WHO.)
11 Nov 2015	28,635	11,314	3,805	2,536	10,672	4,808	14,122	3,955	(Note: 11 Nov: All governments as per WHO.)
4 Nov 2015	28,607	11,314	3,810	2,536	10,672	4,808	14,089	3,955	(Note: 4 Nov: All governments as per WHO.)
25 Oct 2015	28,539	11,298	3,806	2,535	10,672	4,808	14,061	3,955	(Note: 25 Oct: All governments as per WHO.)
18 Oct 2015	28,476	11,298	3,803	2,535	10,672	4,808	14,001	3,955	
11 Oct 2015	28,454	11,297	3,800	2,534	10,672	4,808	13,982	3,955	(Note: 30 Aug: All governments as per WHO.)
27 Sep 2015	28,388	11,296	3,805	2,533	10,672	4,808	13,911	3,955	
20 Sep 2015	28,295	11,295	3,800	2,532	10,672	4,808	13,823	3,955	
13 Sep 2015	28,220	11,291	3,792	2,530	10,672	4,808	13,756	3,953	
6 Sep 2015	28,147	11,291	3,792	2,530	10,672	4,808	13,683	3,953	
30 Aug 2015	28,073	11,290	3,792	2,529	10,672	4,808	13,609	3,953	
16 Aug 2015	27,952	11,284	3,786	2,524	10,672	4,808	13,494	3,952	
9 Aug 2015	27,929	11,283	3,787	2,524	10,672	4,808	13,470	3,951	
26 Jul 2015	27,748	11,279	3,786	2,520	10,672	4,808	13,290	3,951	
12 Jul 2015	27,642	11,261	3,760	2,506	10,673	4,808	13,209	3,947	
5 Jul 2015	27,573	11,246	3,748	2,499	10,670	4,807	13,155	3,940	(Note: 5 July: All governments as per WHO. Liberia as per situation update)
28 Jun 2015	27,514	11,220	3,729	2,482	10,666	4,806	13,119	3,932	
21 Jun 2015	27,443	11,207	3,718	2,473	10,666	4,806	13,059	3,924	
14 Jun 2015	27,305	11,169	3,674	2,444	10,666	4,806	12,965	3,919	
31 May 2015	27,110	11,132	3,652	2,429	10,666	4,806	12,827	3,912	
17 May 2015	26,898	11,105	3,635	2,407	10,666	4,806	12,632	3,907	
3 May 2015	26,558	10,990	3,589	2,386	10,564	4,716	12,440	3,903	
19 Apr 2015	26,009	10,793	3,565	2,358	10,212	4,573	12,267	3,877	
5 Apr 2015	25,480	10,557	3,515	2,333	9,862	4,408	12,138	3,831	
22 Mar 2015	24,837	10,296	3,429	2,263	9,602	4,301	11,841	3,747	
8 Mar 2015	≥24,247	≥9,961	3,285	2,170	≥9,343	≥4,162	11,619	3,629	
22 Feb 2015	23,659	9,574	3,155	2,091	9,238	4,037	11,301	3,461	
8 Feb 2015	22,824	9,147	3,044	1,995	≥8,881	≥3,826	10,934	3,341	
25 Jan 2015	22,022	8,780	2,917	1,910	8,622	3,686	10,518	3,199	
11 Jan 2015	21,226	8,399	2,806	1,814	8,331	3,538	10,124	3,062	
28 Dec 2014	20,171	7,890	2,707	1,709	8,018	3,423	9,446	2,758	
14 Dec 2014	18,565	7,273	2,415	1,525	7,819	3,346	8,356	2,417	
30 Nov 2014	17,110	6,397	2,164	1,325	7,653	3,157	7,312	1,915	
18 Nov 2014	15,291	5,765	2,047	1,214	7,082	2,963	6,190	1,598	
2 Nov 2014	13,015	5,188	1,731	1,041	6,525	2,697	4,759	1,450	
19 Oct 2014	9,911	4,890	1,540	926	4,665	2,705	3,706	1,259	
12 Oct 2014	8,950	4,476	1,472	843	4,249	2,458	3,252	1,183	
28 Sep 2014	7,169	3,278	1,157	710	3,696	1,998	2,317	570	
14 Sep 2014	5,327	2,578	942	601	2,720	1,461	1,655	516	
31 Aug 2014	3,664	1,794	771	494	1,698	871	1,216	436	
16 Aug 2014	2,225	1,225	543	394	834	466	848	365	
9 Aug 2014	1,835	1,011	506	373	599	323	730	315	
30 Jul 2014	1,437	825	472	346	391	227	574	252	
23 Jul 2014	1,201	672	427	319	249	129	525	224	
14 Jul 2014	982	613	411	310	174	106	397	197	
2 Jul 2014	779	481	412	305	115	75	252	101	
17 Jun 2014	528	337	398	264	33	24	97	49	
27 May 2014	309	202	281	186	12	11	16	5	
12 May 2014	260	182	248	171	12	11	–	–	
1 May 2014	239	160	226	149	13	11	–	–	
14 Apr 2014	176	110	168	108	8	2	–	–	
31 Mar 2014	130	82	122	80	8	2	–	–	
22 Mar 2014	49	29	49	29	–	–	–	–	

Minor Ebola virus outbreaks by country and by date – 30 July 2014 to most recent WHO / Gov update
Date	Total		Nigeria		Senegal		(United States) USA		Spain		Mali		(United Kingdom) U.K.		Italy		Refs
Date	Cases	Deaths	Cases	Deaths	Cases	Deaths	Cases	Deaths	Cases	Deaths	Cases	Deaths	Cases	Deaths	Cases	Deaths	Refs
4 Nov 2015	36	15	20	8	1	0	4	1	1	0	8	6	1	0	1	0	(Note: No chance in Data from 13 May till 4 Nov)
13 May 2015	36	15	20	8	1	0	4	1	1	0	8	6	1	0	1	0	(Note: No chance in Data from 29 December till 13 May)
29 Dec 2014	35	15	20	8	1	0	4	1	1	0	8	6	1	0	–	–	(Note: 29 December: All governments as per WHO. United Kingdom case dated 29 December.)
14 Dec 2014	32	15	20	8	1	0	4	1	1	0	6	6	–	–	–	–	
2 Nov 2014	27	10	20	8	1	0	4	1	1	0	1	1	–	–	–	–	
19 Oct 2014	25	9	20	8	1	0	3	1	1	0	-	–	–	–	–	–	
12 Oct 2014	23	8	20	8	1	0	1	0	1	0	-	–	–	–	–	–	
28 Sep 2014	22	8	20	8	1	0	1	0	-	–	-	–	–	–	–	–	
31 Aug 2014	22	7	21	7	1	0	–	–	-	–	-	–	–	–	–	–	
16 Aug 2014	15	4	15	4	–	–	-	–	-	–	-	–	–	–	–	–	
9 Aug 2014	13	2	13	2	–	–	-	–	-	–	–	–	–	–	–	–	
30 Jul 2014	3	1	3	1	–	–	–	–	-	–	–	–	–	–	–	–	

Notes:

- Date is the "as of" date from the reference. A single source may report statistics for multiple "as of" dates.
- Total cases and deaths before 1 July 2014 are calculated.
- Numbers with ≥ may not be consistent due to under reporting.
