= Ouse to Ouse Tock =

Three-day Ebola quarantine in Sierra Leone

The Ouse to Ouse Tock (House to House Talk) was a three-day quarantine in Sierra Leone from 19 September 2014 to 21 September 2014. It was part of an effort to combat the Ebola virus epidemic in Sierra Leone, part of the Ebola virus epidemic in West Africa. One of the goals was to cut down on transmission within families, so individual homes were visited. There was concern that some families were harboring Ebola cases and that there was a lack of knowledge about the disease.

== History ==
The whole population had an imposed a three-day lockdown from 19 to 21 September 2014. During this period 28,500 trained community workers and volunteers, in 7,000 teams went door-to-door providing information on how to prevent infection, as well as setting up community Ebola surveillance teams. The campaign was called the Ouse to Ouse Tock in Krio language, meaning the house-to-house talk. By this time in Sierra Leone alone over 400 people had died from Ebola.

On 22 September the head of the Ebola Emergency Operations Centre, Stephen Gaojia, said that the three-day lockdown had met its objective and would not be extended. Eighty percent of targeted households were reached in the operation. Initially a total of around 150 new cases had been uncovered, although this was adjusted when the health ministry got reports from remote locations. One incident during the lockdown occurred when a burial team was attacked.
