= Ebola virus epidemic in Guinea =

2013–2016 disease outbreak in Guinea

- A map of Guinea where the Ebola virus outbreak began
- Cases contracted in Guinea: 3,806 (as of 25 October 2015)
- Deaths: 2,535

An epidemic of Ebola virus disease in Guinea from 2013 to 2016 represented the first-ever outbreak of Ebola in a West African country. Previous outbreaks had been confined to several countries in Sub-Saharan Africa. The epidemic, which began with the death of a two-year-old boy, was part of a larger Ebola virus epidemic in West Africa which spread through Guinea and the neighboring countries of Liberia and Sierra Leone, with minor outbreaks occurring in Senegal, Nigeria, and Mali. In December 2015, Guinea was declared free of Ebola transmission by the U.N. World Health Organization, however further cases continued to be reported from March 2016. The country was again declared as Ebola-free in June 2016.

== Epidemiology ==
Researchers from the Robert Koch Institute believe that the index case was a one or two-year-old boy who lived in the remote village of Meliandou, Guéckédou located in the Nzérékoré Region of Guinea. Researchers believe that the boy was said to have contracted the virus while he was playing near a tree that was a roosting place for Angolan free-tailed bats infected with the virus. Dr. Fabian Leendertz, an epidemiologist who was part of the investigative team, said Ebola virus is transmitted to humans either through contact with larger wildlife or by direct contact with bats. The boy, later identified as Emile Ouamouno, fell ill on 2 December 2013 and died four days later. The boy's sister fell ill next, followed by his mother and grandmother. It is believed the Ebola virus later spread to the villages of Dandou Pombo and Dawa, both in Guéckédou, by the midwife who attended the boy. From Dawa village the virus spread to Guéckédou Baladou District and Guéckédou Farako District, and on to Macenta and Kissidougou.

Although Ebola represents a major public health issue in sub-Saharan Africa, no cases had ever been reported in West Africa and the early cases were diagnosed as other diseases more common to the area such as Lassa fever, another hemorrhagic fever similar to Ebola. Thus, it was not until March 2014 that the outbreak was recognized as Ebola. The Ministry of Health of Guinea notified the World Health Organization (WHO), and on 23 March the WHO announced an outbreak of Ebola virus disease in Guinea with a total of 49 cases as of that date. By late May, the outbreak had spread to Conakry, Guinea's capital, a city of about two million inhabitants.

== Containment efforts ==
=== Quarantines and travel restrictions ===
Location of Guinea

In August, Guinea's President Alpha Conde declared a national health emergency due to the outbreak. He stated efforts to control the spread of the Ebola virus would include forbidding Ebola patients from leaving their homes, border control, travel restrictions, and hospitalization for individuals suspected to be infected until cleared by laboratory results. He also banned the transporting of the dead between towns.

Good disease tracing was important to prevent the outbreak from spreading. Previous Ebola outbreaks had occurred in remote areas making containment easier; the West African outbreak struck in an area that lies at the centre of both a highly-mobile and densely populated region which made tracking more difficult: "This time, the virus is traveling effortlessly across borders by plane, car and foot, shifting from forests to cities and springing up in clusters far from any previously known infections. Border closures, flight bans and mass quarantines have been ineffective." Peter Piot, who co-discovered Ebola, said Ebola "isn't striking in a 'linear fashion' this time. It's hopping around, especially in Liberia, Guinea and Sierra Leone".

=== Fear of healthcare workers and clinics ===
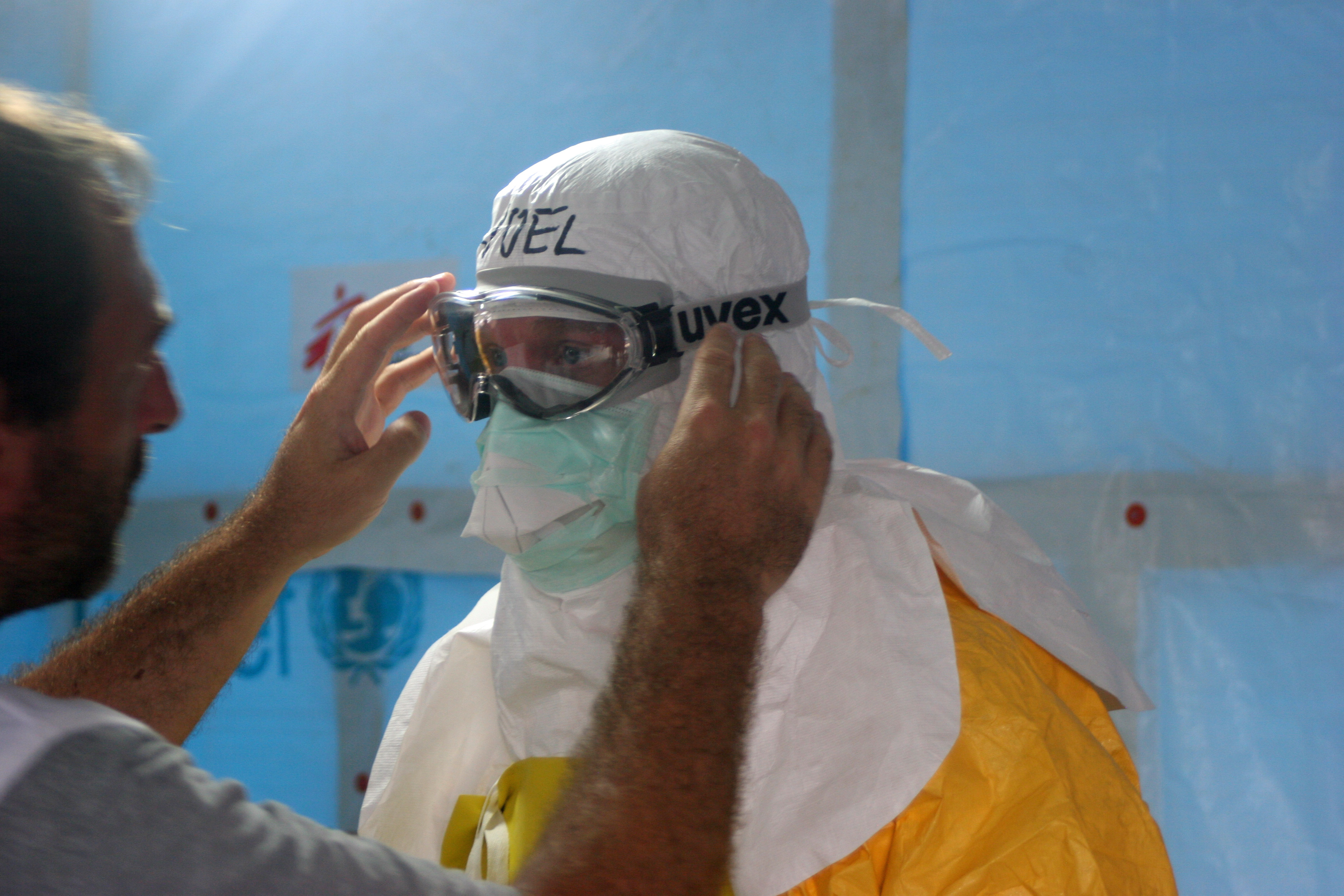
Médecins Sans Frontières staff dressed in protective clothing

Containment was also difficult due to fear of healthcare workers. Infected people and those that they were in contact with evaded surveillance, moving at will and hiding their illnesses while they infected others in turn. Entire villages, stricken by fear, closed themselves off, giving the disease an opportunity to strike in another area. It was reported that in some areas it was believed that health workers were purposely spreading the disease to the people, while others believed that the disease did not exist. Riots broke out in the regional capital, Nzérékoré, when rumors were spread that people were being contaminated when health workers were spraying a market area to decontaminate it.

In May, the number of Ebola cases appeared to be decreasing and Médecins Sans Frontières (MSF) closed a treatment facility in the Macenta region because the outbreak of Ebola there appeared to have been resolved. At the time it was thought that the new cases were caused by people returning from Liberia or from Sierra Leone; however it was later suggested that villagers had become fearful and were hiding cases rather than reporting them. Seeing workers wearing the required protection outfits worn by health workers and taking those suspected of having Ebola or of being contacts to the treatment center (perhaps never to be seen again), refusing the usual burial rituals when a patient died, and other actions taken by the unfamiliar individuals that had come to their remote areas, had led to rumors of organ harvesting and government and tribal plots. According to a September news report, "Many Guineans say local and foreign healthcare workers are part of a conspiracy which either deliberately introduced the outbreak, or invented it as a means of luring Africans to clinics to harvest their blood and organs." As described in another news article, "The health workers don't look like any people you've ever seen. They perform stiffly and slowly, and then they disappear into the tent where your mother or brother may be, and everything that happens inside is left to your imagination. Villagers began to whisper to one another—They're harvesting our organs; they're taking our limbs". Moreover, due to fear, many people were avoiding hospital treatment for any ailment and were self-treating with over the counter drugs from a pharmacy.

On 18 September, eight members of a health care team were murdered by local villagers in the town of Womey near Nzérékoré. The team consisted of Guinean health and government officials accompanied by journalists, who had been distributing Ebola information and doing disinfection work. They were attacked with machetes and clubs, and their bodies were found in a septic tank. The dead included three journalists and four volunteers.

== Outbreak progression ==
=== October 2014 ===
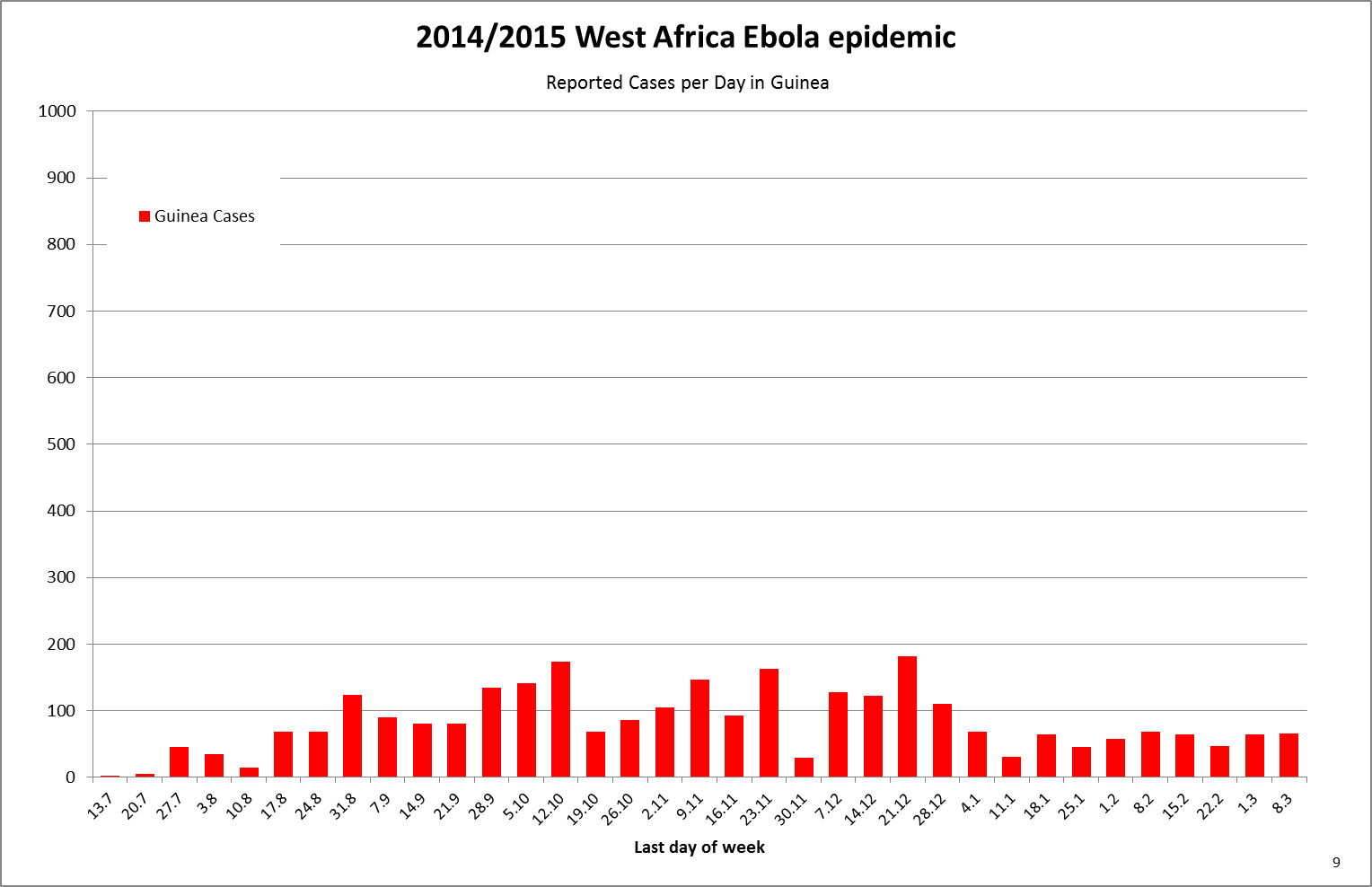
The reported weekly cases of Ebola in Guinea as listed on Wikipedia's 2014 Ebola Virus in West Africa timeline of reported cases and deaths; some values are interpolated.

The governor of Conakry, Soriba Sorel Camara, prohibited all cultural events for the holiday of Tabaski in a decree of 2 October 2014.

In the WHO Situation Report of 8 October, it was reported, that the transmission of Ebola was persistently high with approximately 100 new confirmed cases in the first week of October. The first cases were reported in the district of Lola. Médecins Sans Frontières reported a massive spike in the number of new cases in the capital city of Conakry. One facility admitted 22 patients in a single day (6 October), 18 of them coming from Coyah region, 50 kilometres (31 miles) east of Conakry.

On 19 October, Guinea reported two new districts with Ebola cases. The Kankan district, on the border with the Côte d'Ivoire and a major trade route to Mali, confirmed one case. Kankan also borders the district of Kerouane in this country, one of the areas with the most intense virus transmissions. The Faranah district to the north of the border area of Koinadugu in Sierra Leone also reported a confirmed case. Koinadugu was one of the last Ebola-free regions in that country. According to a WHO report, this new development highlights the need for increased surveillance of cross border traffic in an effort to contain the disease to the three most affected countries.

On 23 October, Saccoba Keita, the head of Guinea's Ebola mission, announced the government has started compensating the families of health care workers who died after contracting the virus. At that time, 42 health care workers had died, including doctors, nurses, drivers, and porters. The compensation totals $10,000 (£6,200) and is to be paid as a lump sum.

=== November 2014 ===
In mid-November, the WHO reported that while intense transmission persists and cases and deaths continue to be under-reported, there is some evidence that case incidence is no longer increasing nationally in Guinea. They report that case numbers in some districts have been fluctuating, but they remain consistently high. New case numbers have been declining in the outbreak's point of origin, Gueckedou, but transmission continues to be high in Macenta. Of a total of 34 districts in Guinea, 10 remain unaffected by Ebola, contrasting with Liberia and Sierra Leone, where every district has been affected.

On 20 November, the local Red Cross in Kankan Prefecture sent blood samples via a courier when the taxi he was traveling in was stopped by robbers. The bandits made off with the cooler bag containing the blood samples. The Guinea authorities made a public appeal for the return of the blood samples. The robbery occurred near the town of Kissidougou.

=== December 2014 ===
On 14 December the WHO stated that 17 districts reported new confirmed or suspected cases in this week. Guinea reported 2,416 cases with 1,525 deaths on this date. Only 10 out of the 34 districts have not reported cases. Conakry reported 18 new cases in this week. The northern district of Siguiri is of particular concern, as it borders Mali and reported 4 new probable cases.

=== Free of Ebola transmission ===
The country was declared free of Ebola transmission on 29 December 2015, 42 days after the last Ebola patient tested negative for a second time. Guinea was subsequently in a 90-day period of heightened surveillance according to the U.N. World Health Organization which also offered assistance - with funding from the agency's donors.

== New cases March 2016 ==
On 17 March 2016, the government of Guinea reported 2 people had tested positive for Ebola virus in Korokpara. It was also reported that they were from a village where members of one family had died recently from vomiting (and diarrhoea). On 19 March, it was reported that another individual died due to the virus, at the treatment centre in Nzerekore. The country's government quarantined an area around the home where the cases took place. This region of Guinea is where the first case was registered in December 2013, at the beginning of the Ebola outbreak. On 22 March, it was reported that medical authorities in Guinea have quarantined 816 people as possibly having had contact with the prior cases (more than one hundred individuals were considered high risk); on the same day Liberia ordered its border with Guinea closed. Macenta prefecture, 200 kilometers from Korokpara, registered the fifth fatality due to the Ebola virus disease in Guinea. On 29 March it was reported that about 1000 contacts had been identified (142 as high risk), and on 30 March 3 more confirmed cases were reported from the sub-prefecture of Koropara in Guinea. On 1 April it was reported that possible contacts, which number in the hundreds, had been vaccinated with an experimental vaccine, in a "ring vaccination" approach.

On 5 April it was reported that there were nine new cases of Ebola since the virus resurfaced. Of these nine cases eight have died. After a 42-day waiting period, the WHO declared the country free of Ebola on 1 June.

== Vaccines ==
After a trial run of an experimental Ebola vaccine involving 11,000 people in Guinea, Merck, the vaccine's manufacturer, announced it was found to be "highly protective" against the virus. This confirmed the results of a study published in 2015 that awarded the vaccine 100 percent effectiveness after tests on 4000 people in Guinea who had been in close contact with Ebola patients. However, a study sponsored by the National Institutes of Health, the Food and Drug Administration and the U.S. Department of Health and Human Services, and conducted by researchers from the U.S. National Academy of Medicine, called the vaccine's effectiveness in preventing Ebola infections into question. In particular, the authors criticized the methodology of the patient trail, and argued that the protection provided by the vaccine may be lower than officially announced.

The WHO approved the vaccine for use in the ongoing Ebola outbreak on 29 May 2017.

It was announced in May 2017 that the Gamaleya Research Institute of Epidemiology and Microbiology in Russia would deliver 1000 doses of an independently produced vaccine to Guinea for testing. According to a Xinhua report, it is the only officially authorized and approved Ebola vaccine for clinical use to date.

== Works derived from the Ebola crisis ==
- "White Ebola", a political song by Mr. Monrovia, AG Da Profit and Daddy Cool, centered on the general mistrust of foreigners.
- "Ebola in Town", a dance tune by a group of West African rappers, D-12, Shadow and Kuzzy Of 2 Kings, warns people of the dangers of the Ebola virus and explaining how to react.
- Senegalese rapper Xuman parodied Rihanna's "Umbrella" in "Ebola est là" (Ebola Is Here). The song's lyrics warn locals that, "The disease is among our neighbours, Liberians and Guineans."
- "Africa Stop Ebola", featuring contributions from Malian, Guinean, Ivorian, Congolese and Senegalese artists was recorded to raise awareness of Ebola and offers info on how people can protect themselves from the disease. The song is sung in several of the local languages.
- There are a number of Ebola-themed jokes circulating in West Africa.

== See also ==
- Ebola virus epidemic in Sierra Leone
- Ebola virus epidemic in Liberia
- Ebola virus disease in Mali
- Ebola virus disease in Nigeria
- Health in Guinea
- Massacre at Womey
- 2014 Ebola Virus in West Africa timeline of reported cases and deaths
