= Meliandou =

Populated place in Guéckédou Prefecture, Guinea

Coordinates: 8.6226°N 10.0642°W

Meliandou is a village in Guéckédou Prefecture, in the Nzérékoré Region of southern Guinea. Medical researchers believe that the village was the location of the first known case of Ebola virus disease in the epidemic in West Africa. The patient zero of Ebola was a two-year-old boy who died in 2013. The boy's pregnant mother, sister, and grandmother also became ill with symptoms consistent with Ebola infection and died. People infected by those victims later spread the disease to other villages.

Prior to the Ebola outbreak, the villagers sold their farm produce to the nearby town of Guéckédou. As of October 2014, they found themselves unable to sell their products anymore.

== See also ==
- Ebola virus epidemic in Guinea
