= Episcopal Conference of Guinea =

Assembly of Catholic bishops

The Episcopal Conference of Guinea (French: Conférence Episcopal de la Guinée, CEG) is the episcopal conference of the Catholic Church in Guinea. The ECG is a member of the Regional Episcopal Conference of Francophone West Africa and Symposium of Episcopal Conferences of Africa and Madagascar (SECAM).

The current president is Raphaël Balla Guilavogui, Bishop of N'Zérékoré.

== Past presidents ==
- Raymond-Marie Tchidimbo, Archbishop of Conakry (1970–1979)
- Robert Sarah, Archbishop of Conakry (1985–2001)
- Philippe Kourouma, Bishop of N'Zérékoré (2002–2007)
- Vincent Coulibaly, Archbishop of Conakry (2007–2013)
- Emmanuel Félémou, Bishop of Kankan (2013–2018)

== See also ==
- Catholic Church in Guinea
