= List of Catholic dioceses in Guinea =

The Roman Catholic Church in Guinea is composed of one ecclesiastical province and four suffragan dioceses.

== List of dioceses ==
=== Episcopal Conference of Guinea ===
==== Ecclesiastical Province of Conakry ====
- Archdiocese of Conakry
  - Diocese of Boké
  - Diocese of Guéckédou
  - Diocese of Kankan
  - Diocese of N’Zérékoré
