= Diocese of Guéckédou =

Roman Catholic diocese in Guinea

Location
- Country: Guinea
- Territory: Prefectures of Guéckédou, Kissidougou, Kérouané, and Macenta
- Ecclesiastical province: Province of Conakry
- Metropolitan: Vincent Coulibaly

Statistics
- Area: 35,476 km^{2} (13,697 sq mi)
- Population: Total; Catholics: 1,285,308; 62,509 (4.86%)
- Parishes: 17
- Schools: 13

Information
- Denomination: Roman Catholic
- Rite: Roman Rite
- Established: June 29, 2023; 2 years ago
- Cathedral: Our Lady of the Rosary Cathedral in Guéckédou
- Secular priests: 30

Current leadership
- Pope: Leo XIV
- Bishop-elect: Norbert Tamba Sandouno

Map

The Roman Catholic Diocese of Guéckédou is a diocese of the Roman Catholic Church in Guinea.

== History ==
On 29 June 2023, the diocese was established from the diocesan territories of Kankan and N'Zérékoré, and was made a suffragan diocese of the Roman Catholic Archdiocese of Conakry.

== See also ==
- Roman Catholicism in Guinea
