= Diocese of N'Zérékoré =

Roman Catholic diocese in Guinea

Coordinates: 7.7579°N 8.8176°W

Diocese of N’Zérékoré Nzerekorensis

Location
- Country: Guinea
- Metropolitan: Conakry

Statistics
- Area: 45,000 km^{2} (17,000 sq mi)
- Population: Total; Catholics: (as of 2004); 1,037,632; 76,269 (7.4%)

Information
- Rite: Latin Rite

Current leadership
- Pope: Leo XIV
- Bishop: Raphaël Balla Guilavogui

Map
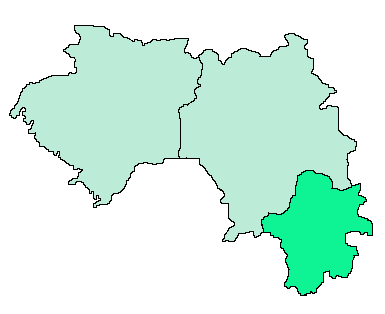

The Roman Catholic Diocese of N'Zérékoré (Latin: Nzerekoren(sis)) is a diocese located in the city of N'Zérékoré in the ecclesiastical province of Conakry in Guinea.

== History ==
- March 9, 1937: Established as Apostolic Prefecture of N'Zérékoré from Apostolic Vicariate of Bamako in Mali
- April 25, 1959: Promoted as Diocese of N'Zérékoré

== Bishops ==
- Prefects Apostolic of N'Zérékoré (Roman rite)
  - Fr. Agostino Guérin, M. Afr. (1937.04.16 – 1950)
  - Fr. Eugène Maillat, M. Afr. (1951–1959.04.25); see below
- Bishops of N'Zérékoré (Roman rite)
  - Bishop Eugène Maillat, M. Afr. (1959.04.25 – 1979.08.13); see above
  - Bishop Philippe Kourouma (1979.08.13 - retired 2007.11.27)
  - Bishop Raphael Balla Guilavogui (since 2008.12.13)

=== Other priest of this diocese who became bishop ===
- Emmanuel Félémou, appointed Bishop of Kankan in 2007

== See also ==
- Roman Catholicism in Guinea
- Immaculate Heart of Mary Cathedral, Nzérékoré

== Sources ==
- GCatholic.org
- Catholic Hierarchy
