= Eugène Maillat =

Swiss Catholic prelate (1919–1988)

His Excellency Eugène Maillat MAfr
- Bishop of N'Zérékoré
- Metropolis: Conakry
- Installed: 25 April 1959
- Term ended: 13 August 1979
- Predecessor: -
- Successor: Philippe Kourouma
- Previous post: Apostolic prefect of N'Zérékoré

Orders
- Ordination: 14 April 1945
- Consecration: 27 September 1959 by Franz von Streng

Personal details
- Born: 30 July 1919 Courtedoux
- Died: 5 July 1988 (aged 68) Fribourg

Eugène Maillat (30 July 1919 – 5 July 1988) was a Swiss Roman Catholic prelate of the White Fathers. He was appointed bishop of N'Zérékoré from 1959 to 1979. He died on 5 July 1988 at the age of 88.

Catholic Church titles
| Preceded by - | Bishop of N'Zérékoré; 1959–1979 | Succeeded by Philippe Kourouma |
