= Moïse Tinguiano =

Guinean Catholic prelate (born 1977)

- Bishop of Boké
- Church: Catholic Church
- Diocese: Boké
- Appointed: 22 February 2024
- Installed: 28 April 2024

Orders
- Ordination: 26 November 2006
- Consecration: 27 April 2024 by Robert Sarah

Personal details
- Born: 11 December 1977 (age 48) Benty, People's Revolutionary Republic of Guinea

Ordination history
History
Episcopal consecration
- Principal consecrator: Robert Sarah
- Co-consecrators: Jean-Sylvain Emien Mambé, Vincent Coulibaly

Moïse Tinguiano (born 11 December 1977) is a Guinean Roman Catholic prelate. He has been the bishop of the Diocese of Boké since 2024.
