= St. Mary's Cathedral, Conakry =

Church in Conakry, Guinea

Coordinates: 9.510217°N 13.715583°W

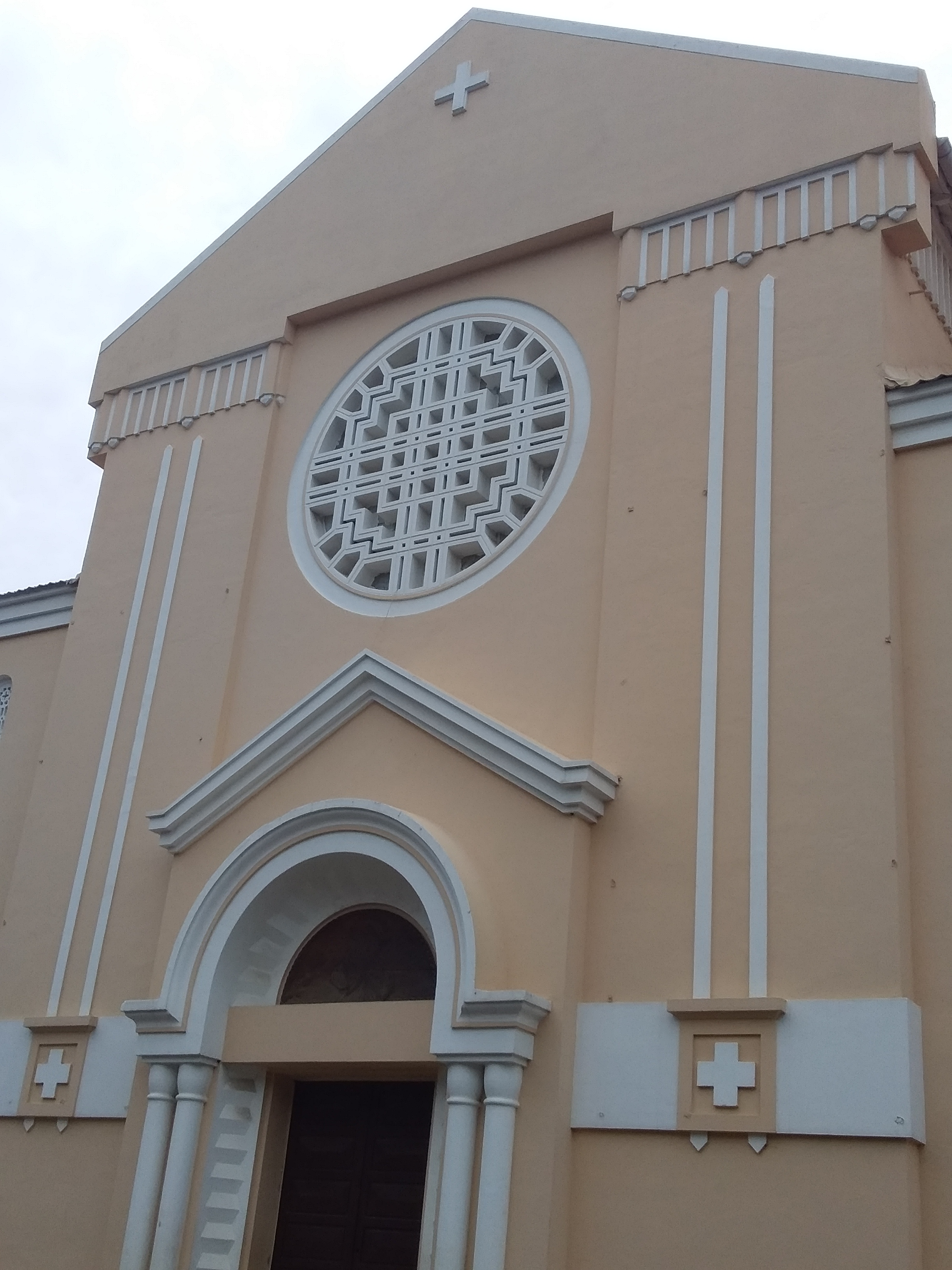

The Cathédrale Sainte-Marie is an important place of Christian worship in Conakry, Guinea. The yellow and red building is of considerable architectural interest.

Monseigneur Raymond René Lérouge laid the foundation stone of the Cathedral in 1928. The Cathedral was built in the 1930s, and has impressive architecture, with Orthodox design elements. The Palais Presidentiel is behind the cathedral. Opposite is the Ministry of Higher Education and Scientific Research.

The cathedral is the primary place of worship for the Roman Catholic Archdiocese of Conakry, established on 18 October 1897 as the Apostolic Prefecture of French Guinea, and promoted to its present rank on 14 September 1959. From May 2003 the Archbishop was Vincent Coulibaly. Since the people of Guinea are mainly Muslim, the cathedral does not have a large congregation.

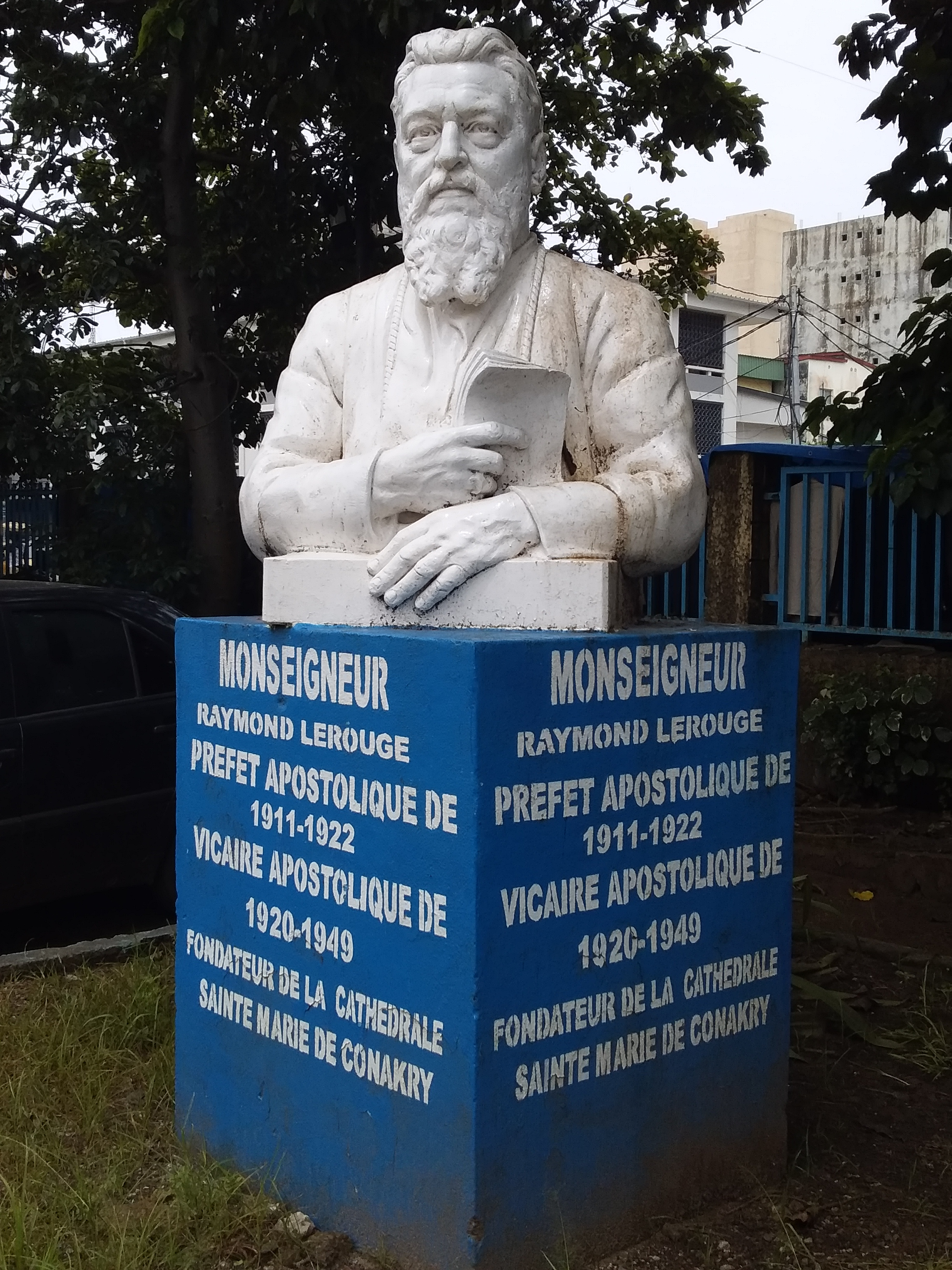
Sculpture of Monseigneur Raymond Lerouge.

== See also ==
- List of buildings and structures in Guinea
