= François Sylla =

Guinean Catholic prelate (born 1972

The Most Reverend François Sylla
- Archbishop of Conakry
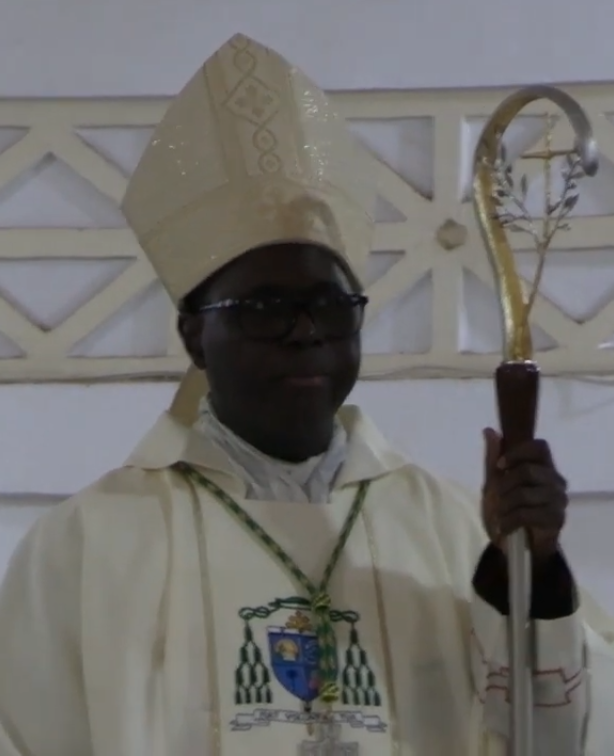
- Archbishop Sylla in 2026
- Church: Catholic Church
- Archdiocese: Roman Catholic Archdiocese of Conakry
- See: Conakry
- Appointed: 28 February 2026
- Installed: 28 February 2026
- Predecessor: Vincent Coulibaly
- Successor: Incumbent
- Other post: Coadjutor Archbishop of Conakry (11 May 2024 - 28 February 2026)

Orders
- Ordination: 21 November 2004
- Consecration: 8 June 2024 by Jean-Sylvain Emien Mambé
- Rank: Bishop

Personal details
- Born: François Sylla; 9 April 1972 (age 54) Siboty, Archdiocese of Conakry, Guinea

Styles of François Sylla
- Reference style: Your Lordship; The Most Reverend
- Spoken style: His Lordship
- Religious style: Bishop

François Sylla (born 9 April 1972) is a Guinean Catholic prelate who serves as the Archbishop of the Roman Catholic Archdiocese of Conakry, in Guinea, since 2026. Before that, from 2024 to 2026, he was the Coadjutor Bishop of the same Catholic Archdiocese.

He was appointed bishop by Pope Francis. He was consecrated at Conakry on 8 June 2024 by Jean-Sylvain Emien Mambé, Titular Archbishop of Potentia in Piceno, the Papal Nuncio. On 28 February 2026, upon the health-related resignation of Archbishop Vincent Coulibaly from the pastoral care of the Ecclesiastical Metropolitan Province of Conakry, Archbishop François Sylla succeeded him as the new archbishop.

== Background and education ==
He was born on 9 April 1972 in Siboty, in the Catholic Archdiocese of Conakry. He attended the Kindia Minor Seminary in Kindia. He then studied at the Jean XXIII Preparatory Seminary, also in Kindia. He studied philosophy and theology at the Saint Augustin de Samaya Major Seminary in Bamako, Mali. He holds a Master's degree in comparative law of religions awarded by the Faculty of Theology of Lugano in Switzerland, where he studied from 2007 until 2010. From 2010 until 2013, he studied at the Pontifical Lateran University, in Rome, Italy, where he graduated with a Doctorate in canon law.

== Priest ==
He was ordained a priest for the Archdiocese of Conakry on 21 November 2004. He served as a priest until 11 May 2024. While a priest, he served in various roles and locations, including:

- Parish vicar of Conakry Cathedral from 2004 until 2007.
- Studies in Switzerland at the Faculty of Theology of Lugano, leading to the award of a master's degree in comparative law of religions, from 2007 until 2010.
- Provider of pastoral services in the San Giovanni Battista – Induno Olona Parish in the Catholic Archdiocese of Milan, Italy from 2007 until 2011.
- Studies in Rome, Italy at the Pontifical Lateran University, leading to the award of a doctorate in canon law from 2010 until 2013.
- Chancellor of the archdiocese of Conakry from 2013 until 2024.
- Judicial vicar and president of the Metropolitan Tribunal of Conakry from 2015 until 2024.
- President of the Union of the Clergy in Guinea from 2018 until 2022.
- Rector of the Benoit XVI Major Seminary in Kendoumayah, Guinea from 2020 until 2024.

== Bishop ==
On 11 May 2024, Pope Francis appointed Reverend Father Monsignor François Sylla, previously a member of the clergy of same Archdiocese as Coadjutor Archbishop of the archdiocese of Conakry, with the right of succession when the position fell vacant in the future. He was consecrated at Conakry on 8 June 2024 by the hands of Jean-Sylvain Emien Mambé, Titular Archbishop of Potentia in Piceno assisted by Vincent Coulibaly, Archbishop of Conakry and Raphaël Balla Guilavogui, Bishop of N'Zérékoré.

On 28 February 2026, Pope Leo XIV accepted the health-related resignation submitted by Archbishop Vincent Coulibaly from pastoral care of the Ecclesiastical Metropolitan Province of Conakry. That same day, the Holy Father appointed Archbishop François Sylla, previously coadjutor archbishop of the same archdiocese to succeed and become the substantive archbishop.

== See also ==
- Catholic Church in Guinea

== Succession table ==
Catholic Church titles
Preceded by Vincent Coulibaly (6 May 2003 - 28 February 2026)	Archbishop of Conakry (since 28 February 2026)	Succeeded by Incumbent
Preceded by	Coadjutor Archbishop of Conakry (11 May 2024 - 28 February 2026)	Succeeded by
