= Diocese of Boké =

Catholic diocese in Guinea

Diocese of Boké Dioecesis Bokeensis Diocèse de Boké

Location
- Country: Guinea
- Metropolitan: Conakry

Statistics
- Area: 27,908 km^{2} (10,775 sq mi)
- Population: Total; Catholics: (as of 2024); 1,153,909; 10,225 (0.88%)
- Parishes: 6

Information
- Sui iuris church: Latin Church
- Rite: Roman Rite
- Established: February 22, 2024; 2 years ago

Current leadership
- Pope: Leo XIV
- Bishop: Moïse Tinguiano
- Metropolitan Archbishop: Vincent Coulibaly

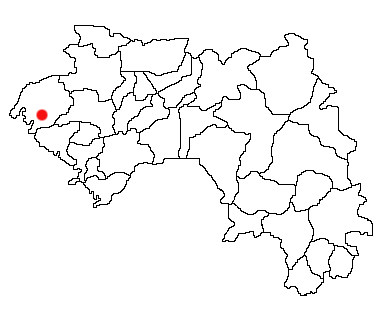
Boké, Guinea Location Map

The Roman Catholic Diocese of Boké (Latin: Dioecesis Bokeensis) is a diocese of the Roman Catholic Church based in the city of Boké, in the Ecclesiastical Province of Conakry in Guinea.

== History ==
In 2022, local leaders began to take an interest in facilitating inter-religious dialogue. Those early dialogues included Catholic representatives.

The diocese was created by Pope Francis on February 22, 2024, from territory of the Archdiocese of Conakry. The new diocese covers much of the civil Boké Region—excluding part of the Boffa Prefecture—and was erected in response to the "pastoral needs of a rapidly growing region." In the same decree which erected the diocese, the Pope named Moïse Tinguiano as the diocese's first bishop.

== Bishops ==
1. Moïse Tinguiano (2024 – )
