= Vincent Coulibaly =

Guinean prelate of the Catholic Church (born 1953)

Most Reverend Vincent Coulibaly
- Archbishop Emeritus of Conakry
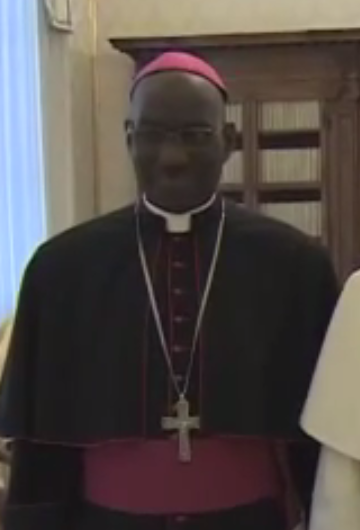
- Coulibaly in 2014
- Church: Catholic
- Archdiocese: Archdiocese of Conakry
- Appointed: 6 May 2003
- Term ended: 28 February 2026
- Predecessor: Robert Sarah
- Successor: François Sylla
- Previous posts: Bishop of Kankan (1993-2003); President, Episcopal Conference of Guinea (2007-2013)

Personal details
- Born: Vincent Coulibaly; 16 March 1953 (age 73) Kiniéran, French Guinea
- Education: Minor Seminary Jean XXIII (Kindia); Major Seminary Pierre Claver (Koumi)

Ordination history
History
Diaconal ordination
- Ordained by: Pierre-Marie Coty
Priestly ordination
- Ordained by: Robert Sarah
Episcopal consecration
- Principal consecrator: Robert Sarah
- Co-consecrators: Mori Julien-Marie Sidibé, Philippe Kourouma
Episcopal succession
Bishops consecrated by Vincent Coulibaly as principal consecrator
- Emmanuel Félémou: 2007
- Raphaël Balla Guilavogui: 2008
- Alexis Aly Tagbino: 2017

Styles of Vincent Coulibaly
- Reference style: His Eminence
- Spoken style: Your Eminence
- Religious style: Archbishop

Vincent Coulibaly is Guinean prelate of the Catholic Church who was the archbishop of Conakry in Guinea from 2003 to 2026. From 1994 to 2003 he was bishop of Kankan.

== Biography ==
Vincent Coulibaly was born on 16 March 1953 in Kiniéran, French Guinea. In November 1969 he entered the Minor Seminary Jean-XXIII in Kindia, Guinea. In September 1974 he entered the Major Seminary Pierre-Claver in Koumi in Upper Volta, now Burkina-Faso.

On 28 July 1979, he was ordained a deacon in the Diocese of Kankan. He was ordained a priest on 8 May 1981. From 1981 to 1989, he was parochial vicar in Kankan. He became formator at the John XXIII Seminary in Kindia in 1989 and from 1990 to December 1993 was the seminary's director.

On 17 November 1993, Pope John Paul II appointed him bishop of Kankan. He received his episcopal consecration on 12 February 1994 from Robert Sarah, Archbishop of Conakry.

Pope John Paul named him to succeed Sarah as archbishop of Conakry on 6 May 2003.

He was president of the Episcopal Conference of Guinea from 2007 to 2013.

== See also ==
- Religion in Guinea
- Christianity in Guinea
- Catholic Church in Guinea

Catholic Church titles
Preceded by Jean-Baptiste Coudray	Bishop of Kankan; 1994-2003	Succeeded by Emmanuel Félémou
Preceded by Robert Sarah	Archbishop of Conakry; 2003–2026	Succeeded by François Sylla
Preceded by Philippe Kourouma	President, Episcopal Conference of Guinea; 2007–2013	Succeeded by Emmanuel Félémou
