= Raymond-Marie Tchidimbo =

Catholic archbishop (1920–2011)

Raymond-Marie Tchidimbo C.S.Sp.
- Archbishop of Conakry
- Church: Roman Catholic Church
- Archdiocese: Conakry
- In office: 1962–1979
- Predecessor: Gérard-Paul-Louis-Marie de Milleville
- Successor: Robert Sarah

Orders
- Ordination: October 7, 1951. Holy Ghost Father

Personal details
- Born: August 15, 1920 Conakry, French West Africa
- Died: March 26, 2011 (aged 90) Venasque, France
- Motto: Spes non confundit

Raymond-Marie Tchidimbo (August 15, 1920 – March 26, 2011) was a Guinean archbishop of the Roman Catholic Church, the son of a Gabonese father and a Guinean mother. He is notable for his eight-year imprisonment during the dictatorship of Sékou Touré.

== Biography ==
Tchidimbo was born in Conakry, French West Africa (now Guinea) and was ordained a priest on October 7, 1951, as a member of the Congregation of the Holy Spirit (also known as the 'Holy Ghost Fathers').

Tchidimbo was appointed Archbishop of the Archdiocese of Conakry on March 10, 1962, and ordained bishop on May 31, 1962. At the time, Guinea was ruled by a Marxist dictatorship led by Sékou Touré. In November 1970, in the wake of the attempted overthrow of Touré during Operation Green Sea, the regime embarked on a series of purges targeting political and civic leaders suspected of disloyalty. As part of the purges, Tchidimbo was arrested on December 24. He was tortured, tried in absentia, and sentenced to life imprisonment on January 23, 1971. He spent the next eight years at the Camp Boiro concentration camp.

As part of a deal between the Holy See and the Touré regime, he was freed on August 7, 1979, and flown to Rome. Subsequently, on August 13, he resigned from his position of Archbishop of Conakry; Robert Sarah was appointed as his successor. In 1987, he published a book about his captivity entitled Noviciat d'un évêque: huit ans de captivité sous Sékou Touré (Novitiate of a Bishop: Eight Years in Captivity under Sékou Touré; Paris: Fayard).
