= Archdiocese of Conakry =

Latin Catholic jurisdiction in Guinea

Coordinates: 9.5102°N 13.7157°W

Archdiocese of Conakry Archidioecesis Konakriensis Archidiocèse de Conakry
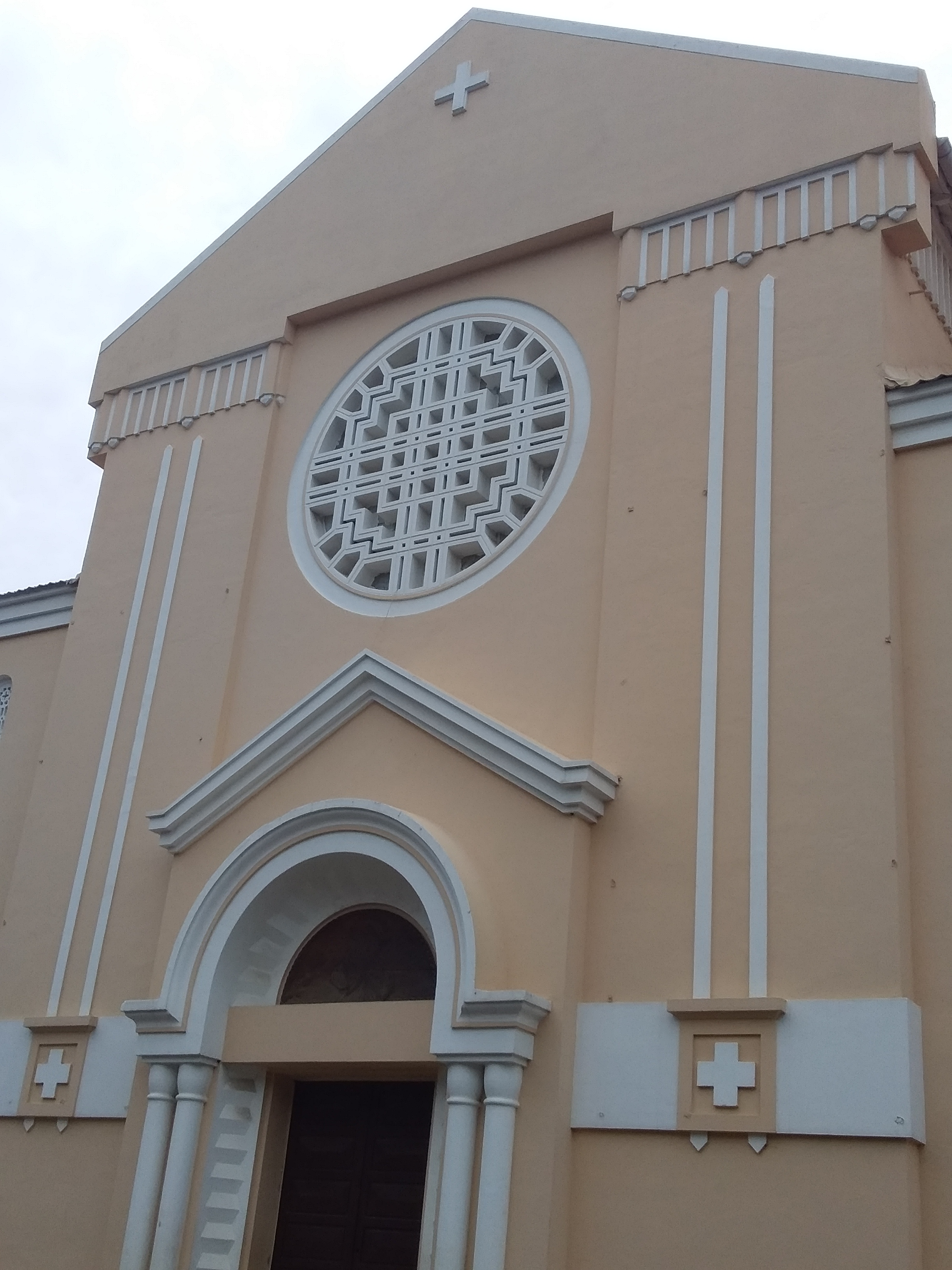
- St. Mary's Cathedral, Conakry

Location
- Country: Guinea
- Headquarters: Conakry, Guinea

Statistics
- Area: 88,664 km^{2} (34,233 sq mi)
- Population: Total; Catholics: (as of 2024); 5,211,530; 170,000 (3.3%)
- Parishes: 32

Information
- Denomination: Catholic Church
- Sui iuris church: Latin Church
- Rite: Roman Rite
- Established: 18 October 1897; 128 years ago
- Cathedral: St. Mary's Cathedral, Conakry
- Secular priests: 61 (47 Diocesan, 14 Religious Orders)

Current leadership
- Pope: Leo XIV
- Metropolitan Archbishop: François Sylla
- Bishops emeritus: Vincent Coulibaly

The Archdiocese of Conakry (Latin: Konakrien(sis)) is a Latin Church ecclesiastical territory or archdiocese of the Catholic Church in Guinea. It is the metropolitan see for its ecclesiastical province which covers all Guinea. It depends upon the Congregation for the Evangelization of Peoples.

The archbishop's cathedra is within the Cathédrale Sainte-Marie, in the national capital Conakry.

== Statistics ==
As of 2024, it pastorally served 170,000 Catholics (3.3% of 5,211,530 total) on 88,664 km² in 32 parishes and one mission with 61 priests (47 diocesan, 14 religious), 86 lay religious (19 brothers, 67 sisters) and 27 seminarians.

== Ecclesiastical province ==
All other dioceses in Guinea are suffragan sees of Conakry:

- Roman Catholic Diocese of Boké
- Roman Catholic Diocese of Guéckédou
- Roman Catholic Diocese of Kankan
- Roman Catholic Diocese of N’Zérékoré

== History ==
On 18 October 1897, the Apostolic Prefecture of French Guinea was established on French colonial territories canonically split off from the Apostolic Vicariate of Senegambia (based in Senegal) and the Apostolic Vicariate of Sierra Leone (in Sierra Leone).

On 18 April 1920, it became the Apostolic Vicariate of French Guinea.

On 12 May 1949, it was renamed the Apostolic Vicariate of Conakry, having lost territory to establish the Apostolic Prefecture of Kankan, now one of its suffragan dioceses.

On 14 September 1955, was elevated to a residential see, named the Metropolitan Archdiocese of Conakry.

On 22 February 2024, it lost territory to establish the Roman Catholic Diocese of Boké.

It enjoyed a Papal visit by Pope John Paul II in February 1992.

== Ordinaries ==
Prefect Apostolic of French Guinea

- Raymond-René Lerouge, C.S.Sp. (9 March 1911 – 22 April 1920 see below)

Vicar Apostolic of French Guinea

- Raymond-René Lerouge, C.S.Sp. (see above 22 April 1920 – 12 May 1949 see below)

Vicars Apostolic of Conakry

- Raymond-René Lerouge, C.S.Sp. (see above 12 May 1949 – 2 July 1949)
- Michel-Jules-Joseph-Marie Bernard, C.S.Sp. (12 March 1950 – 18 July 1954), appointed Vicar Apostolic of Brazzaville
- Gérard-Paul-Louis-Marie de Milleville, C.S.Sp. (8 May 1955 – 14 September 1955 see below)

Metropolitan Archbishops of Conakry

- Gérard-Paul-Louis-Marie de Milleville, C.S.Sp. (see above 14 September 1955 – 10 March 1962), resigned
- Raymond-Marie Tchidimbo, C.S.Sp. (10 March 1962 – 13 August 1979), retired
  - Apostolic Administrator Louis Pathé Barry (January 1971 – 8 December 1979), Priest of Conakry
- Robert Sarah (13 August 1979 – 1 October 2001), appointed Secretary of the Congregation for the Evangelization of Peoples
- Vincent Coulibaly (6 May 2003 – 28 February 2026), resigned
- François Sylla (28 February 2026 – Present)

Coadjutor Bishops

- François Sylla (2024-2026), succeeded

Another priest of this archdiocese who became bishop

- Moïse Tinguiano (2006-2024), appointed Bishop of Boké

== See also ==
- Roman Catholicism in Guinea
- List of Roman Catholic dioceses in Guinea

== Sources and external links ==
- GCatholic.org, with Google satellite photo
