= Catholic Church in Guinea =

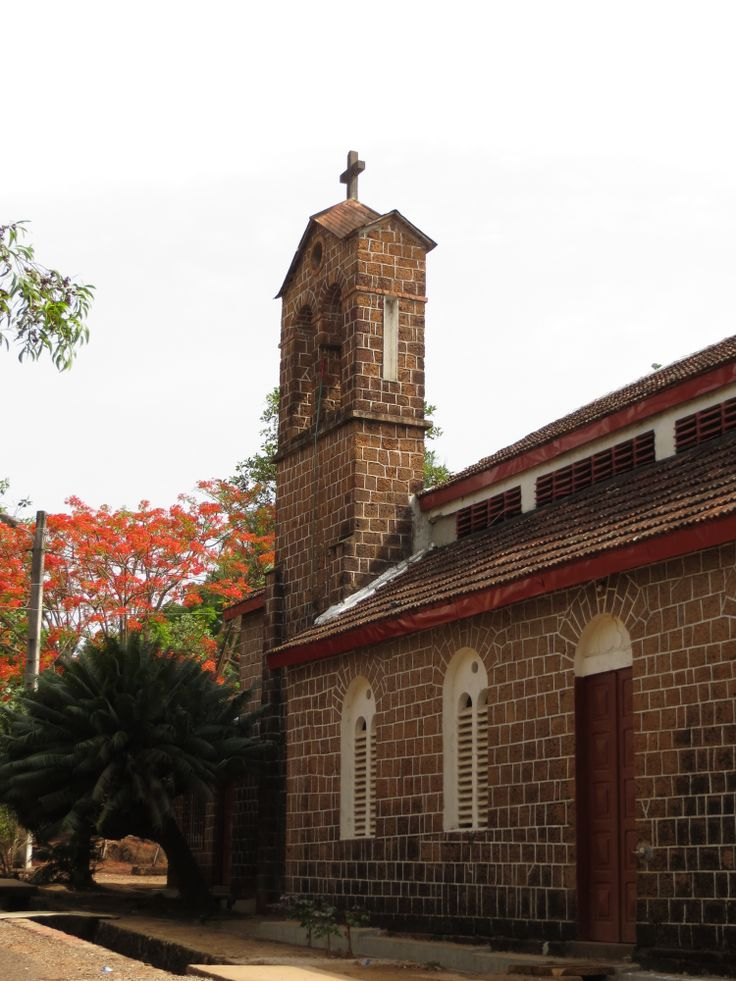

The Catholic Church in Guinea is part of the worldwide Catholic Church, under the spiritual leadership of the pope.

Figures in 2020 show that 3.52% of Guinea's population is Christian. This is made up of Catholics (2.28%), Protestants (0.44%) and other Christians 0.8%.

There is one archdiocese (Conakry) and two dioceses (Kankan and N’Zérékoré). A new diocese (in Guéckédou) was announced in June 2023.

In 2020, there were 181 priests and 140 nuns serving 76 parishes in the country.

== See also ==
- Religion in Guinea
- Christianity in Guinea
- Vincent Coulibaly
- Robert Sarah
