= Emmanuel Félémou =

Guinean Roman Catholic bishop (1960–2021)

- Bishop of Kankan
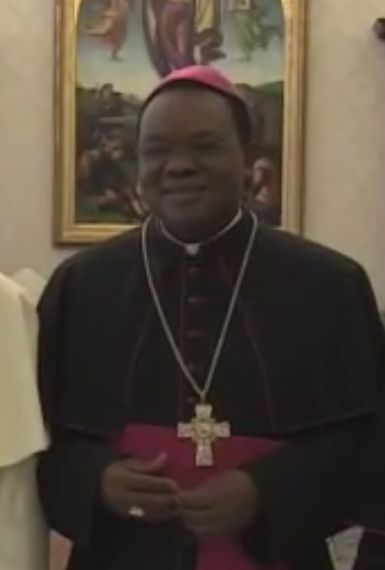
- Church: Catholic Church
- Diocese: Diocese of Kankan
- In office: 5 January 2007 – 1 March 2021
- Predecessor: Vincent Coulibaly
- Successor: Alexis Aly Tagbino

Orders
- Ordination: 19 November 1989
- Consecration: 17 March 2007 by Robert Sarah

Personal details
- Born: 24 December 1960 Kolouma (east of Bofossou), Guinea
- Died: 1 March 2021 (aged 60) Conakry, Guinea

Emmanuel Félémou (24 December 1960 – 1 March 2021) was a Guinean prelate of the Roman Catholic Church.

== Biography ==
Born in Kolouma, Félémou was ordained to the priesthood in 1989. He was appointed bishop of Kankan in 2007, serving until his death in 2021.

On 1 March 2021, Félémou died from COVID-19 in Conakry during the COVID-19 pandemic in Guinea.
