= Robert Sarah =

Guinean Catholic cardinal (born 1945)

His Eminence Robert Sarah
- Prefect Emeritus of the Congregation for Divine Worship and the Discipline of the Sacraments
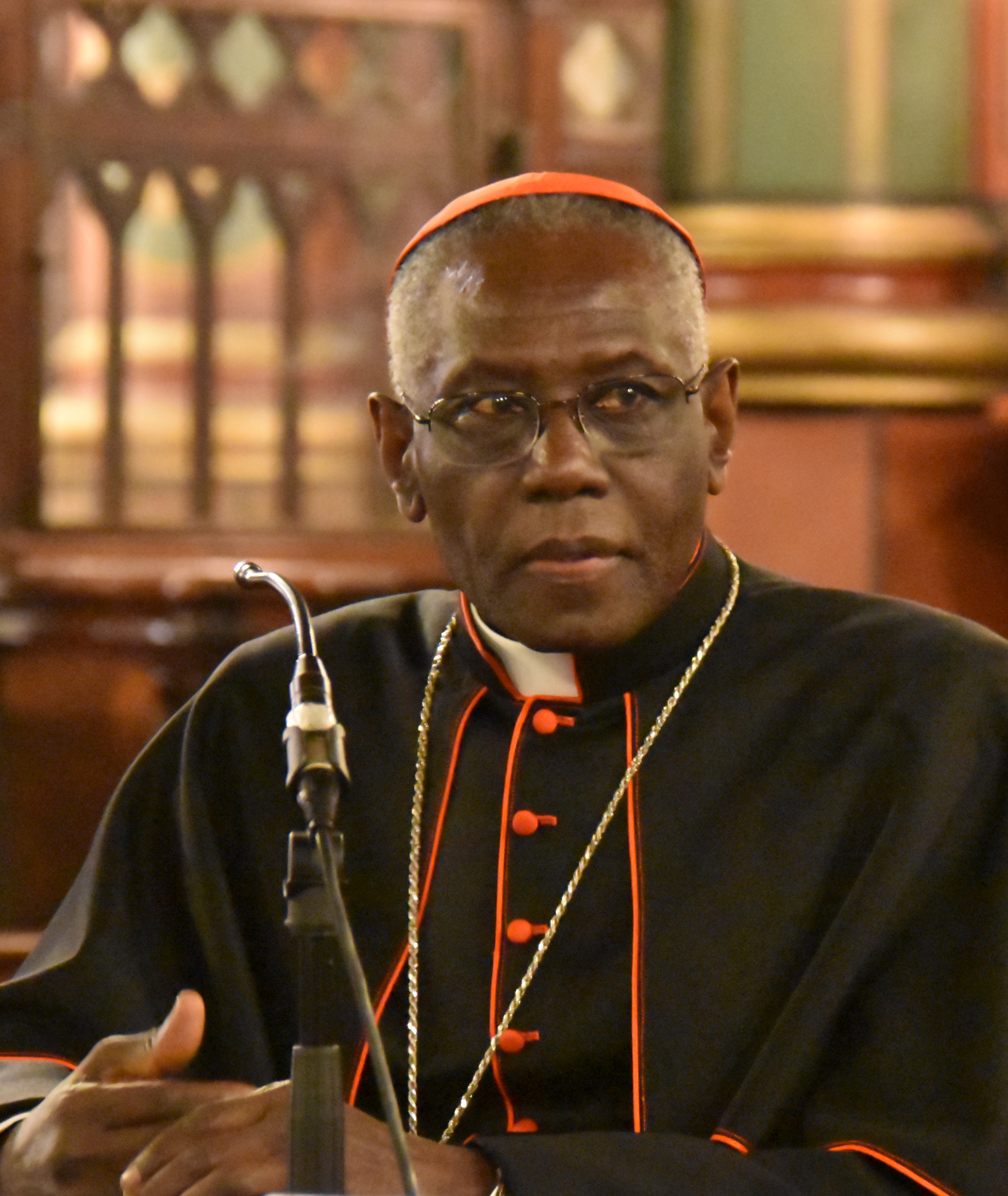
- Sarah in 2015
- Church: Catholic Church
- Appointed: 23 November 2014
- Term ended: 20 February 2021
- Predecessor: Antonio Cañizares Llovera
- Successor: Arthur Roche
- Other post: Cardinal-Priest 'pro hac vice' of San Giovanni Bosco in Via Tuscolana (2021–present)
- Previous posts: Archbishop of Conakry (1979–2001); Apostolic Administrator of Kankan (1979–93); President of the Guinean Episcopal Conference (1985–2001); Secretary of the Congregation for the Evangelization of Peoples (2001–10); Vice-Grand Chancellor of the Pontifical Urbaniana University (2001–10); President of the Pontifical Council Cor Unum (2010–14)

Orders
- Ordination: 20 July 1969 by Raymond-Maria Tchidimbo
- Consecration: 8 December 1979 by Giovanni Benelli
- Created cardinal: 20 November 2010 by Benedict XVI
- Rank: Cardinal-Deacon (2010–21); Cardinal-Priest (2021–present)

Personal details
- Born: 15 June 1945 (age 81) Ourous, French Guinea
- Denomination: Catholic (Roman Rite)
- Education: Pontifical Gregorian University (Licentiate, Theology); Studium Biblicum Franciscanum (Licentiate, Sacred Scriptures)
- Motto: Latin: Sufficit tibi gratia mea, lit. 'My grace is sufficient for thee'
- Coat of arms: Robert Sarah's coat of arms

Robert Sarah ([ʁɔbɛʁ saʁa]; born 15 June 1945) is a Guinean Catholic prelate who served as prefect of the Congregation for Divine Worship and the Discipline of the Sacraments from 23 November 2014 to 20 February 2021. He previously served as secretary of the Congregation for the Evangelization of Peoples under Pope John Paul II and president of the Pontifical Council Cor Unum under Pope Benedict XVI. He was made a cardinal in 2010.

== Early life and education ==
Sarah was born in Ourous, a rural village in then French Guinea, on 15 June 1945, the son of cultivators and converts to Christianity from animism. He is a member of the Coniagui ethnic group in northern Guinea. In 1957, at age 12, he entered Saint Augustine Minor Seminary in Bingerville, Ivory Coast, where he studied for three years. Because in 1960 relations between newly independent Guinea and the Ivory Coast were strained, he continued his studies briefly in Conakry, Guinea, at Saint Mary of Dixinn Seminary run by the Holy Ghost Fathers, until the radical government of Guinea expropriated Church property in August 1961. After independent study at home, the Church negotiated a place for Sarah and some fellow seminarians at a government-run school in Kindia in March 1962 and then won the right to open a seminary, where Sarah earned his baccalaureate in 1964. In September of that year he was sent to study at the Grand Seminary in Nancy, France. Again, deteriorating international relations, this time between Guinea and France, forced him to interrupt his studies, and he completed his theological studies in Sébikotane, Senegal, between October 1967 and June 1969. From 1969 to 1974 he studied at the Pontifical Gregorian University in Rome, where he obtained a licentiate in theology, except for the year 1971 which he spent at the Studium Biblicum Franciscanum of Jerusalem, where he obtained a licentiate in Sacred Scriptures.

Sarah speaks French, English, Spanish and Italian fluently.

== Presbyterate and episcopate ==
Ordination history of Robert Sarah
History
Priestly ordination
- Ordained by: Raymond-Maria Tchidimbo (Conakry)
Episcopal consecration
- Consecrated by: Giovanni Benelli (Florence)
- Date: 8 December 1979
Cardinalate
- Elevated by: Benedict XVI

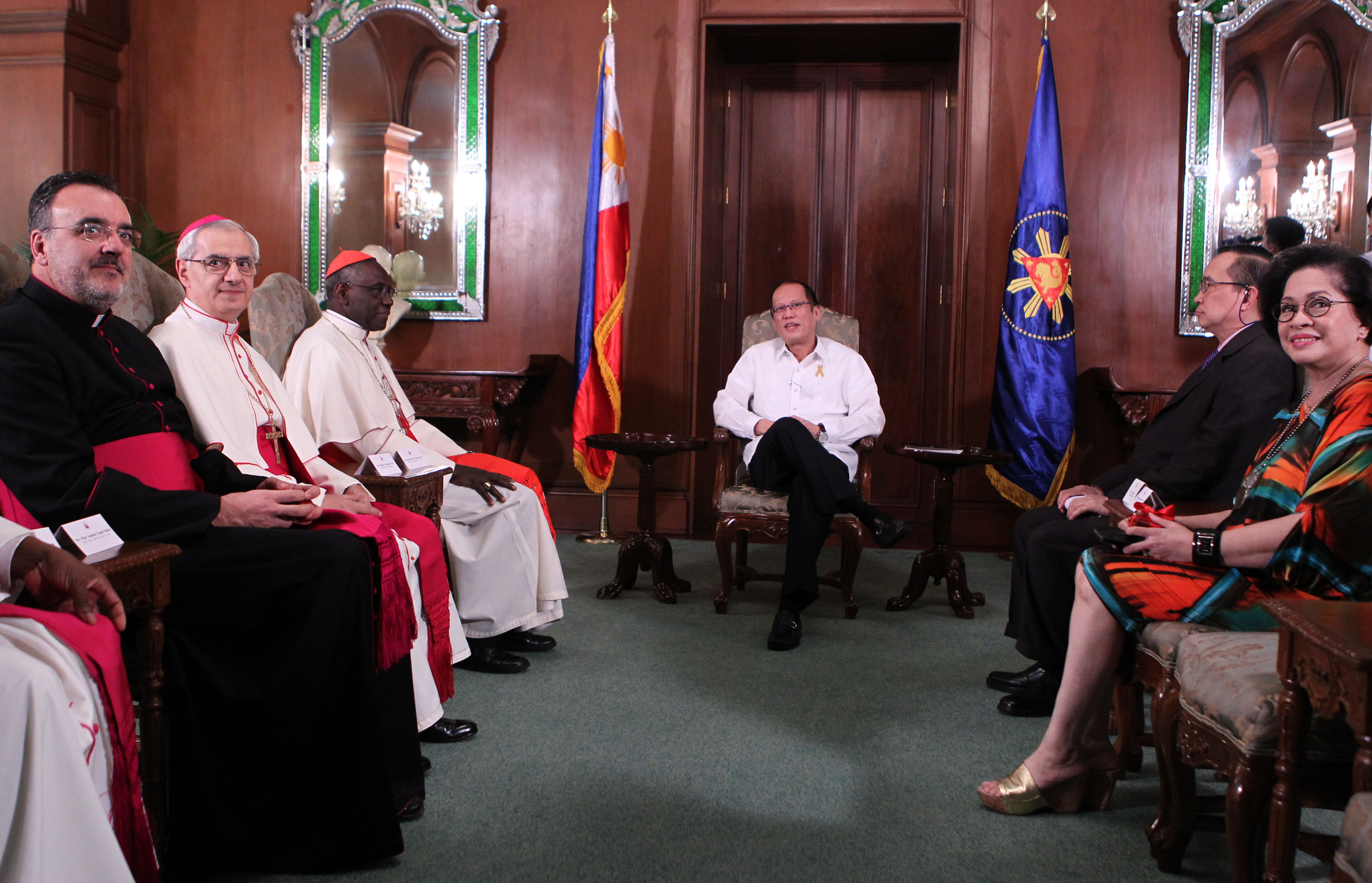
Cardinal Robert Sarah with President Benigno Aquino III of the Philippines during courtesy call at Malacañan Palace

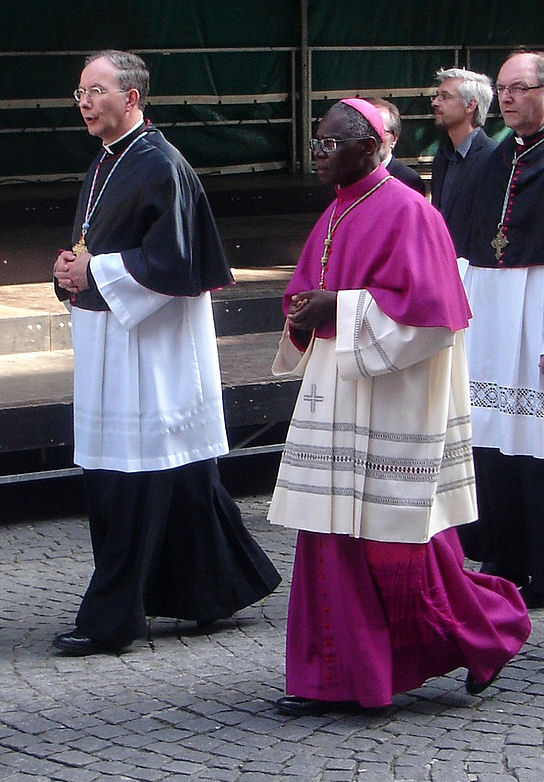
Sarah during the Procession of the Holy Blood in Bruges, Belgium, in 2009

Sarah was ordained to the priesthood on 20 July 1969, and incardinated in the Diocese of Conakry. On 13 August 1979, Pope John Paul II appointed him Metropolitan Archbishop of Conakry. He was consecrated bishop on 8 December 1979 by Cardinal Giovanni Benelli. He served as Conakry's bishop for more than twenty years and during that tenure filled terms as president of the Guinean bishops' conference and of the Episcopal Conference of West Africa.

=== Archbishop under the dictatorship of Sékou Touré ===
Sarah served as archbishop under the dictatorship of Ahmed Sékou Touré, who put Sarah on a death list before himself dying in 1984. However, despite the persecution of priests and laymen, Sarah worked to maintain the Church as the one institution that was independent of the dictatorship. In his book God or Nothing, Sarah rebuked the Marxist dictatorship as a utopian scheme that brought misery and death.

The French daily newspaper Le Figaro reports that Sarah "did not hesitate to oppose the all-powerful Sékou Touré, then 'supreme leader of the revolution' but also a commander of violent repressions. He made the celebrated public statement: 'power wears man out [le pouvoir use l'homme]!'"

The Historical Dictionary of Guinea commented on Sarah's role in resisting Sékou Touré's dictatorship, writing that the Church "managed to play a remarkable role under former Archbishop Robert Sarah in Guinea's public life... Monsignor Robert Sarah is one of the most respected leaders among Guineans, who expressed their strong desire to see him lead the country's political transition on various occasions between 2006 and 2010. He arguably earned much of this popular trust by speaking truth to power during the stormiest years of President Ahmed Sékou Touré's regime, while other spiritual leaders endeavoured to cater to the regime."

== Cardinalate ==
On 20 November 2010, Pope Benedict XVI made him Cardinal-Deacon of San Giovanni Bosco in Via Tuscolana. (He opted for cardinal priest, of the same titular church, on 3 May 2021.) He had the right to vote in papal conclaves until his 80th birthday on 15 June 2025. He was a cardinal elector in the 2013 papal conclave that elected Pope Francis and the 2025 papal conclave that elected Pope Leo XIV.

He was mentioned in the press as papabile, a possible candidate for the papacy, both in 2013 and 2025.

== Roman Curia ==
On 1 October 2001, John Paul II named Sarah secretary of the Congregation for the Evangelization of Peoples, a post he held for ten years. He used the occasion of his departure from Guinea, when he was awarded the country's highest honour, to condemn the government of Lansana Conté. He said that Guinean society was "built on the oppression of the insignificant by the powerful, on contempt for the poor and the weak, on the cleverness of poor stewards of the public good, on the bribery and corruption of the administration and the institutions of the republic".

In October 2010 he was appointed president of the Pontifical Council Cor Unum, which carries responsibility for organising Catholic relief efforts worldwide. He was the second African appointed by Pope Benedict XVI to lead a Vatican dicastery. The first was Peter Cardinal Turkson of Ghana who was appointed president of the Pontifical Council for Justice and Peace in 2009.

On 23 November 2014, Pope Francis appointed Sarah as Prefect of the Congregation for Divine Worship and the Discipline of the Sacraments, as Cor Unum was going to be eliminated as part of Pope Francis' reorganization of the Roman Curia.

On 21 January 2016, Sarah announced that participation in the Holy Thursday foot-washing rite (the mandatum) was no longer limited to men, following instructions from Pope Francis who had included women since the beginning of his papacy. (Note: Pope Francis ordered the change in a letter to Sarah 13 months earlier on 20 December 2014, which mentioned they had discussed the change previously. Francis washed the feet of two women at his first Maundy Thursday liturgy as pope on 28 March 2013.) However, in March, Sarah said that there was no obligation to include women in the ceremony.

=== Liturgy ===
On 27 May 2015, the memorial of Saint Augustine of Canterbury, a new form of the Catholic Mass using the traditional language of the Book of Common Prayer, and titled Divine Worship: The Missal was promulgated over his signature.

In May 2016, Sarah told an interviewer that the Second Vatican Council did not require priests to celebrate Mass versus populum (facing the congregation), describing it as "a possibility, but not an obligation". Sarah also stated that readers and listeners should face each other during the Liturgy of the Word, but "as soon as we reach the moment when one addresses God – from the Offertory onwards – it is essential that the priest and faithful look together towards the east. This corresponds exactly to what the Council Fathers wanted." Sarah rejected the argument that priests celebrating Mass facing the East, or ad orientem, are turning their backs on the faithful or "against them".

Speaking at a London conference on 5 July 2016, Sarah asked all bishops and priests to begin celebrating the Mass ad orientem "wherever possible", "perhaps" by 27 November 2016, the start of Advent. He encouraged Catholics to receive Communion kneeling and said that Pope Francis had asked him to "continue the liturgical work Pope Benedict began". Sarah then met privately with Francis and on 11 July the Holy See Press Office issued a statement that said that Sarah's London remarks had been "incorrectly interpreted, as if they were intended to announce new indications different to those given so far in the liturgical rules and in the words of the Pope regarding celebration facing the people and the ordinary rite of the Mass", that celebrating Mass facing the congregation (versus populum) was "desirable wherever possible" and not to be superseded by ad orientem. It reported that the Pope and the Cardinal were in complete agreement on these points.

He once wrote: "I refuse to waste our time pitting one liturgy against another or the rite of Saint Pius V against that of Blessed Paul VI." In July 2017, he wrote in the French magazine La Nef that he wanted the two forms of the Roman-Rite liturgy whose use is authorized by the 2007 papal document Summorum Pontificum to have the same calendar of feasts and the same Scripture readings, but that the work of a committee formed for that purpose had been unsuccessful. He still proposed that the newer form should restore certain practices that had been abandoned: that the faithful receive communion only on the tongue and while kneeling, that the prayers at the foot of the altar be included in the Mass, and that from the consecration of the host to the ablutions at the end of Mass the priest should keep thumb and index finger of each hand joined. In the older form, in which use of the vernacular language in the Scripture readings instead of Latin has only been made optional, he wished that the Scripture readings should be understood by the people. Earlier that year, Vatican spokesman Federico Lombardi criticised the expression "reform of the reform", which Sarah had used in the previous year; in his La Nef article Sarah said that the expression was best avoided and that he preferred to speak of "liturgical reconciliation".

On a related note, on 24 August 2017, Pope Francis insisted that the liturgical reforms following the Second Vatican Council were "irreversible". Some perceived this as having part of a declaration invoked in his "magisterial authority".

In September 2017, Pope Francis transferred primary responsibility "to faithfully prepare [...] approve and publish" translations of liturgical books into vernacular languages from the Congregation for Divine Worship and the Discipline of the Sacraments to conferences of bishops, ordering the congregation to "help the Episcopal Conferences to fulfil their task." An explanatory note, attributed to Sarah, soon appeared, specifying that the congregation's approval would not be a mere formality but would involve a detailed review that could lead to binding rejections of unsatisfactory translations. On 22 October 2017, the Holy See released a letter that Pope Francis had sent to Sarah, clarifying that the Holy See and its departments would have only limited authority to confirm liturgical translations recognized by a local episcopal conference.

== Positions ==
Sarah has been a vocal advocate for the defence of traditional Catholic teaching on questions of sexual morality and the right to life, and in denouncing Islamic fundamentalism. He has called "gender ideology" and the Islamic State (ISIS) the "two radicalizations" that threaten the family, the former through divorce, same-sex marriage, and abortion, and the latter with child marriage, polygamy, and the subjugation of women. Sarah also opposes euthanasia.

Sarah has been described as largely sympathetic to liturgical practices before the Second Vatican Council but also proposed that partisans of different liturgies learn from each other and seek a middle ground.

=== Islam ===
Sarah grew up and began studying for the priesthood in countries with Islamic majorities. He was impressed by the depth of Islamic religious observance in Guinea and has praised relations between Christians and Muslims there – "the Islam in my country is a fraternal, peaceful religion". He has condemned military intervention by Western powers in Iraq and Syria: "I say emphatically that some Western powers will have perpetrated, directly or symbolically, a crime against humanity." He believes that there is little possibility of theological dialogue between Christians and Muslims given their essential differences (the Trinity, the Resurrection, the Eucharist), but anticipates collaboration at the national or international level on resistance to abortion, euthanasia, and "the new gender ideology".

Sarah has criticised the "pseudo-family of ideologised Islam which legitimises polygamy, female subservience, sexual slavery, child marriage."

=== Views on homosexuality ===
Sarah has opposed various attempts to provide legal recognition to gays and lesbians, often casting his remarks in terms of a defence of traditional Catholic and African values against contemporary secular Western culture. On 28 January 2012, the Secretary-General of the United Nations, Ban Ki-moon, called on African nations to repeal laws that place sanctions on homosexual conduct. Sarah called the speech "stupid". When a journalist asked if Ban Ki-moon was "overstepping his responsibilities", Sarah replied: "Sure, you cannot impose something stupid like that. Poor countries like Africa just accept it because it's imposed upon them through money, through being tied to aid." He said that, "It's not possible to impose on the poor this kind of European mentality," and added that African bishops must react to this move against African culture.

In an interview in September 2015, Sarah described same-sex unions as "retrogressive for culture and civilisation" and a problem for all of humanity. He said that although such unions were increasingly recognised in Europe, they were not approved of in Africa. He blamed "Western ideological colonialism" for promoting the idea of gay marriage, which he warned would "destroy Catholic doctrine". According to The Daily Telegraph, Sarah's "outspoken remarks underlined deep rifts within the Church over the Pope's softer, more compassionate attitude towards homosexuality".

Following the first session of the Synod on the Family in October 2014, Sarah objected to press coverage of the synod's discussion: "what has been published by the media about homosexual unions is an attempt to push the Church [to change] her doctrine". He said the synod's interim report or relatio appropriately objected to international agencies and governments that condition foreign aid on "the introduction of regulations based on gender ideology", but needed to underscore objections to same-sex marriage. He suggested that advocacy on behalf of same-sex unions formed "part of a new ideology of evil".

In October 2015, he played a leading role in the Synod on the Family's rejection of attempts to ensure more welcoming language toward people who are gay or divorced and remarried. Addressing the Synod on perceived threats to marriage and the family, he said, "We need to be inclusive and welcoming to all that is human; but what comes from the Enemy cannot and must not be assimilated. You cannot join Christ and Belial! What Nazi-Fascism and Communism were in the 20th century, Western homosexual and abortion Ideologies and Islamic Fanaticism are today." He said that "Western homosexual and abortion ideologies and Islamic fanaticism" could be seen as "almost like two apocalyptic beasts" with demonic origins, drew parallels between them and Nazism and Communism, and noted that terrorist attacks in France and Tunisia had taken place on the same day that the U.S. Supreme Court issued a ruling in Obergefell v. Hodges that made same-sex civil marriage legal nationwide.

Johan Bonny, Bishop of Antwerp, complained that Sarah tried to silence any discussion of the pastoral care of gay Catholics in the discussion group he led at the Synod: "There was no way of discussing it in a peaceful way." Bonny said the Belgian participants found that the growing influence of the Africans prevented the pastoral solutions they favoured from getting a hearing. When Krzysztof Charamsa, a theologian who lost his position at the Congregation for the Doctrine of the Faith when he revealed that he was in a homosexual relationship on the eve of the Synod, (Note: Charamsa was also immediately removed from his position at the International Theological Commission and two teaching posts at pontifical universities. He was suspended from the priesthood on 21 October 2015.) assessed the Synod's work, he singled out Sarah's language to challenge all the participants: "No one publicly said a word against those defamatory sentences. What kind of respect does that show to us all?"

Addressing the U.S. National Catholic Prayer Breakfast on 17 May 2016, Sarah said that "God is being eroded, eclipsed, [and] liquidated" in the United States because of legal changes being adopted "in the name of 'tolerance'". He cited "the legalization of same-sex marriage, the obligation to accept contraception within health care programs, and even 'bathroom bills' that allow men to use the women's restrooms and locker rooms." He asked: "Should not a biological man use the men's restroom?"

=== Opinion on sexual abuse ===
In response to Pope Benedict XVI's "Notes" on the sexual abuse crisis in the Church, Cardinal Sarah gave a talk published in L'Espresso stating that the notes "proved to be a true source of light in the night of faith that touches the whole Church... The frightening multiplication of abuses has one and only one ultimate cause: the absence of God."

=== Immigration ===
Sarah is a critic of large-scale immigration as well as of the failure of countries to welcome immigrants and provide them a dignified place. In a March 2019 interview, he said: "It is better to help people flourish in their culture than to encourage them to come to a Europe in full decadence. It is a false exegesis to use the word of God to promote migration." In the same interview, Sarah argued that immigrants in Europe often survived in poor conditions and lived "without work or dignity".

== Other appointments ==
On 6 January 2011, Sarah was appointed a member of the Congregation for the Evangelization of Peoples, the Pontifical Council for the Laity, and the Pontifical Council for Justice and Peace. On 10 March 2015, Pope Francis appointed Sarah to serve as a member of the Pontifical Committee for International Eucharistic Congresses.

== Resignation ==
As required by canon law Sarah presented his resignation as prefect of the Congregation for Divine Worship when he turned 75. It was accepted by Pope Francis on 20 February 2021. Cardinal Sarah was admitted to hospital on 12 July 2021 and underwent successful surgery on his prostate. He was released from hospital on 27 July 2021.

== Selected writings ==
- Sarah, Robert (18 October 2022). Catechism of the Spiritual Life. EWTN Publishing, Inc. ISBN 978-1682782934.
- Sarah, Robert (17 November 2021). Pour l'éternité: Méditations sur la figure du prêtre (For Eternity: Meditations on the Figure of the Priest) (in French).
- Sarah, Robert (3 September 2021). Couples, Awaken Your Love (Paperback ed.). Ignatius Press. ISBN 978-1621644828.
- Benedict XVI; Sarah, Robert (2020). From the Depths of Our Hearts: Priesthood, Celibacy and the Crisis of the Catholic Church. Ignatius Press. ISBN 978-1621644149. While Benedict XVI is listed as coauthor of the book, his aide suggests that his role was merely advisory.
- Sarah, Robert; Diat, Nicolas (22 September 2019). The Day is Now Far Spent (Paperback ed.). Ignatius Press. ISBN 978-1621643241.
- Sarah, Robert; Diat, Nicolas (15 April 2017). The Power of Silence: Against the Dictatorship of Noise (Paperback ed.). Ignatius Press. ISBN 978-1621641919.
- Sarah, Robert; Diat, Nicolas (5 October 2016). La force du silence (in French). Fayard.
- Sarah, Robert; Diat, Nicolas (1 September 2015). God or Nothing: A Conversation on Faith (Sew ed.). Ignatius Press. ISBN 978-1621640509.

== Distinctions ==
- Sovereign Military Order of Malta: Bailiff Grand Cross of Honour and Devotion (2016)
- Benin: Knight Grand Cross in the National Order of Benin (2015)
- France: Commander of the Legion of Honour (2012)

== Notes ==
Catholic Church titles
Preceded by Raymond-Maria Tchidimbo C.S.Sp	Archbishop of Conakry; 13 August 1979 – 1 October 2001	Succeeded by Vincent Coulibaly
Preceded by Raymond-Maria Tchidimbo C.S.Sp.	President of the Guinean Episcopal Conference; 1995 – 2001	Succeeded by Philippe Kourouma
Preceded by Marcello Zago O.M.I.	Secretary of the Congregation for the Evangelization of Peoples; 1 October 2001 – 7 October 2010	Succeeded by Savio Hon Tai-Fai S.D.B.
Position created	Vice-Grand Chancellor of the Pontifical Urbaniana University; 1 October 2001 – 7 October 2010	Succeeded by Savio Hon Tai-Fai S.D.B.
Preceded by Paul Cordes	President of the Pontifical Council Cor Unum; 7 October 2010 – 23 November 2014	Office abolished
Preceded by Stephen Fumio Hamao	Cardinal-Deacon of San Giovanni Bosco in Via Tuscolana; 20 November 2010 – 2021	Succeeded by Himself (as cardinal priest)
Preceded by Himself (as cardinal deacon)	Cardinal-Priest of San Giovanni Bosco in Via Tuscolana; 20 November 2021 – present	Incumbent
Preceded by Antonio Cañizares Llovera	Prefect of the Congregation for Divine Worship and the Discipline of the Sacraments; 23 November 2014 – 20 February 2021	Succeeded by Arthur Roche
