= Religion in Guinea =

Religion in Guinea (2023, SRA estimate)
1. Muslim (84.0%)
2. Christian (11.0%)
3. Indigenous beliefs / others (5.00%)

The Conakry Grand Mosque in Guinea, one of the largest mosques in West Africa.

Islam is the largest religion in Guinea, with the early presence of Muslims in the region dating to the 8th century through commercial ties with North Africa. Parts of present-day Guinea would come under the rule of the Mali Empire, a multireligious state ruled by Muslim kings since at least the 1300s and included many Muslim advisers in its court. Christians, individuals with no religion, and adherents of traditional religions represent significant minorities in Guinea. Much of the population, both Muslim and Christian, also incorporate indigenous African beliefs into their outlook.

The latest census data for the country in 2014 reported approximately 89% of Guineans were Muslim, 7% were Christian, and 4% had no religion or practised other faiths (mostly traditional beliefs). In 2023, the Secretariat of Religious Affairs (SRA) in Guinea estimated 84% of the population was Muslim, 11% was Christian, and 5% identified with traditional faiths or other religions.

Small minorities of Hinduism, Buddhism, and Chinese folk religions are present among the foreign resident population in the country.

== Statistics ==
The share of Muslims in Guinea increased from 86.8% to 89.1% of the total resident population between the 1996 and 2014 general population and housing censuses. The growth of Islam in the country is primarily a trend in rural areas. Conversely, the proportion of people with no religious affiliation and adherents of traditional faiths has collectively shrunk from 6.1% to 4% of the population in the same time period. The share of Christians in Guinea has remained relatively stable at nearly 7% of the population.

Religious affiliation by census year
Religion	1996 Census		2014 Census	
Religion	Population	%	Population	%
Islam	6,211,760	86.8	9,376,226	89.1
Christianity	479,479	6.7	715,581	6.8
Traditional	143,128	2.0	168,372	1.6
Other	28,626	0.4	10,524	0.1
No religion	293,413	4.1	252,558	2.4
Total	7,156,406	100	10,523,261	100

=== Religious Geography ===
All four natural regions of Guinea are majority Muslim. Christians are most numerous in Conakry, large cities, the south, and the eastern Forest Region. Indigenous religious beliefs were most prevalent in the Forest Region.

Muslims exceed 89% of the population in all of Guinea's eight administrative regions, with the exception of Nzérékoré. Indeed, the southern Nzérékoré Region is only plurality Muslim and holds the country's highest concentrations of Christians (28.1%), practitioners of traditional religions (10.3%), and those with no religious affiliation (14.2%). Mamou and Labé have the highest proportion of Muslims in Guinea, with 99.4% of the population in both regions practising Islam.

Religious composition of each region (2014 census)
Region	Muslim	Christian	Traditional	No religion	Other
Boké	96.8%	2.8%	0.1%	0.3%	0.0%
Conakry	94.8%	4.8%	0.0%	0.3%	0.1%
Faranah	89.1%	9.7%	0.1%	0.8%	0.2%
Kankan	98.7%	1.1%	0.0%	0.2%	0.0%
Kindia	97.2%	2.3%	0.0%	0.5%	0.0%
Labé	99.4%	0.4%	0.0%	0.2%	0.0%
Mamou	99.4%	0.5%	0.0%	0.1%	0.0%
Nzérékoré	46.7%	28.1%	10.4%	14.2%	0.6%
Total	89.1%	6.8%	1.6%	2.4%	0.1%

=== Other estimates ===
In 2023, the Association of Religion Date Archives (ARDA) has Muslims at 86.8%, Christian 3.52%, and Animist 9.42%.

== Religions ==
=== Islam ===
Guinean Muslims are generally Sunni of Maliki school of jurisprudence, influenced with Sufism, with some Ahmadiyya. Shiism is growing due to the Lebanese diaspora population and few local converts.

=== Christianity ===
Christian groups include Roman Catholics, Anglicans, Baptists, Seventh-day Adventists, and other Evangelical groups. Jehovah's Witnesses are active in the country and recognized by the Government.

=== Other religions ===
There is a small community of the Baháʼí Faith. There are small numbers of Hindus, Buddhists, and traditional Chinese religious groups among the expatriate community.

=== Traditional beliefs ===
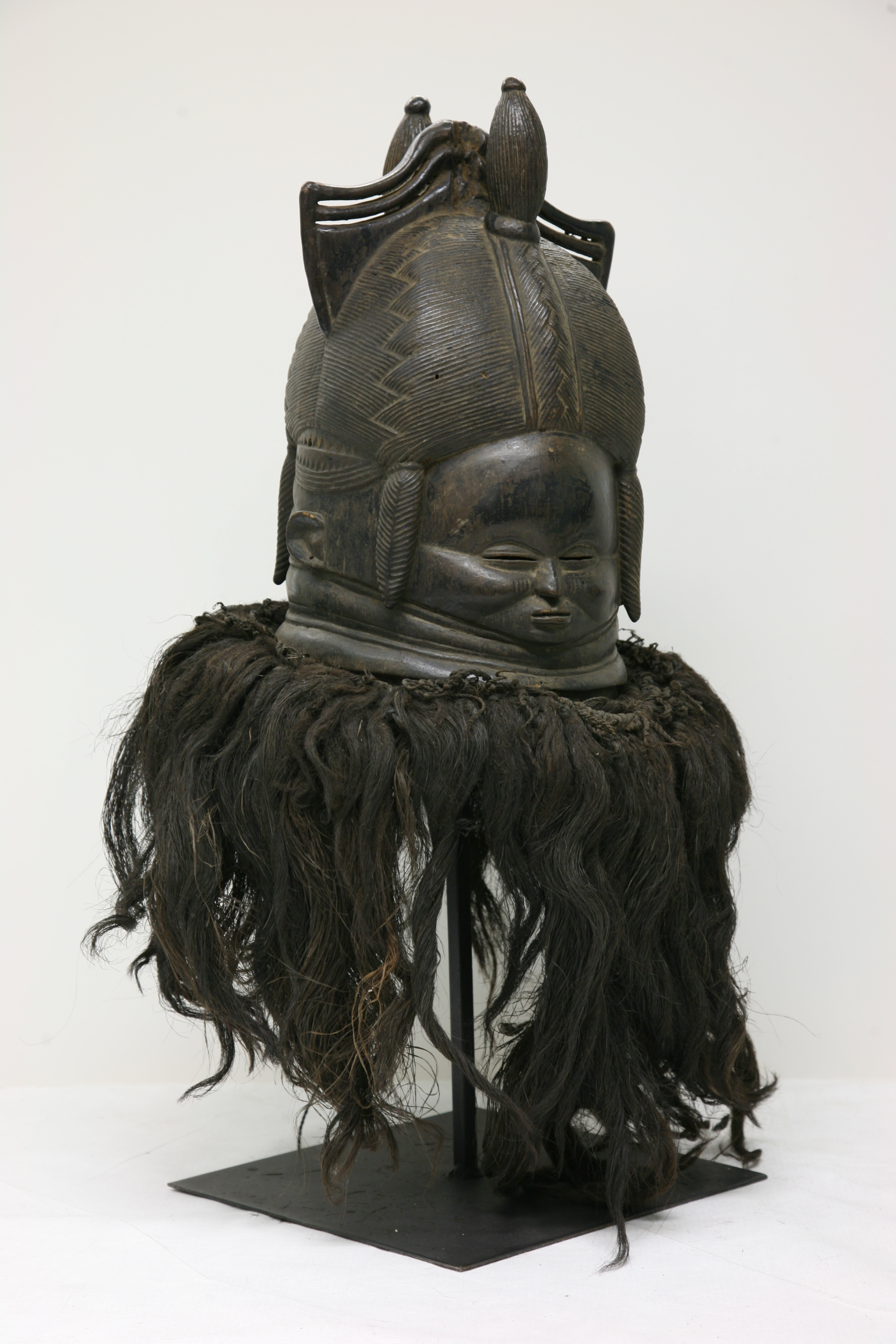
A Sande society helmet mask (1940–1965). The Sande society is a secret women's association.

The Sande society is a secret women's association found in Liberia, Sierra Leone and Guinea that initiates girls into adulthood, confers fertility, instills notions of morality and proper sexual comportment, and maintains an interest in the well-being of its members throughout their lives. In addition, Sande champions women's social and political interests and promotes their solidarity vis-a-vis the Poro society, a complementary institution for men. Today this social institution is found among the Bassa, Gola, Kissi, Kpelle, Loma, Mano and Vai of Liberia.

Throughout the region, the complementarity of men's and women's gender roles - evident in such diverse activities as farming, cloth production, and musical performances - reach full expression. The women's Sande and men's Poro associations alternate political and ritual control of "the land" (a concept embracing the natural and supernatural worlds) for periods of three and four years respectively. During Sande's sovereignty, all signs of the men's society are banished.

At the end of this three-year period, the Sande leadership "turns over the land" to its counterparts in the Poro Society for another four years, and after a rest period the ritual cycle begins anew. The alternating three- and four-year initiation cycles for women and men respectively are one example of the widespread use of the numbers 3 and 4 to signify the gender of people, places and events; together the numbers equal seven, a sacred number throughout the region.

== Religious freedom ==
=== Formal protections ===
The Constitution of Guinea, although suspended from the time of the 2009 military junta until after the 2010 democratic elections, writes that Guinea is a secular state where all enjoy equality before the law, regardless of religion. The constitution provides for the right of individuals to choose, change, and practice the religion of their choice.

The Guinean government's Secretariat of Religious Affairs aims to promote better relations among religious denominations and ameliorate interethnic tensions. The secretary general of religious affairs appoints six national directors to lead the offices of Christian affairs, Islamic affairs, pilgrimages, places of worship, economic affairs and the endowment, and general inspector.

The imams and administrative staff of the principal mosque in the capital city of Conakry, and the principal mosques in the main cities of the four regions, are government employees. These mosques are directly under the administration of the government.

By 2012, the government observed the following religious holidays as national holidays: Mawlid (Muhammad's birthday), Easter Monday, Assumption Day, Eid al-Fitr, Tabaski, and Christmas.

In 2023, the country was scored 3 out of 4 for religious freedom according to Freedom House, which said that religious rights are generally respected occasional reports of discrimination.

=== In Guinean society ===
In some parts of Guinea, strong familial, communal, cultural, social, or economic pressure discourage conversion from Islam. It was reported that in 2012 that in the town of Dinguiraye, a holy city for African Muslims, public celebration of non-Muslim religious holidays or festivals are not permitted. Dinguiraye town authorities have also refused permission to build a church within its boundaries.

=== Ethno-religious violence ===
There were 3 days of ethno-religious fighting in the city of Nzerekore in July 2013. Fighting between ethnic Kpelle, who are Christian or animist, and ethnic Konianke, who are Muslims and close to the larger Malinke ethnic group, left at least 54 dead. The dead included people who were killed with machetes and burned alive. The violence ended after the Guinea military imposed a curfew, and President Conde made a televised appeal for calm.

In 2022, violence was limited to Kendoumaya, Lower Guinea, and mainly concerned a land rights dispute between locals and a monastery.
