= Philippe Kourouma =

- Bishop of N'Zérékoré
- Church: Catholic Church
- Diocese: Diocese of N'Zérékoré
- In office: 13 August 1979 – 27 November 2007
- Predecessor: Eugène Maillat
- Successor: Raphaël Balla Guilavogui

Orders
- Ordination: 8 September 1962
- Consecration: 15 December 1979 by Bernard Agré

Personal details
- Born: 29 November 1932 Samoé, French Guinea, French West Africa, French Empire
- Died: 10 February 2009 (aged 76)

Philippe Kourouma (29 November 1932, in Samoé – 10 February 2009) was the Guinean bishop of the Roman Catholic Diocese of N’Zérékoré from 15 December 1979, until his retirement on 27 November 2007. He remained Bishop Emeritus of the diocese from his retirement until his death on 10 February 2009, at the age of 76.
