= Diocese of Kankan =

Roman Catholic diocese in Guinea

Coordinates: 10.3728°N 9.3017°W

Diocese of Kankan Diœcesis Kankanensis

Location
- Country: Guinea
- Metropolitan: Conakry

Statistics
- Area: 118,000 km^{2} (46,000 sq mi)
- Population: Total; Catholics: (as of 2004); 1,809,716; 55,483 (3.1%)

Information
- Denomination: Catholic Church
- Sui iuris church: Latin Church
- Rite: Roman Rite

Current leadership
- Pope: Leo XIV
- Bishop: Alexis Aly Tagbino

Map
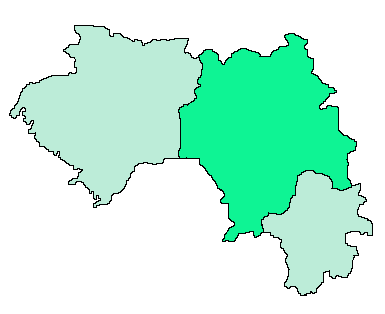

The Diocese of Kankan (Latin: Diœcesis Kankanensis) is a Latin Church ecclesiastical territory or diocese of the Catholic Church in Guinea. It is a suffragan diocese in the ecclesiastical province of the metropolitan Archdiocese of Conakry, yet depends on the missionary Roman Congregation for the Evangelization of Peoples.

Its cathedral is the Marian Cathédrale Notre-Dame des Victoires et de la Paix, dedicated to Our Lady of Victories and Peace, in the episcopal see of Kankan.

== Statistics ==
As of 2014, it pastorally served 72,455 Catholics (3.4% of 2,143,000 total) on 118,000 km^{2} in 14 parishes and 76 missions with 40 priests (32 diocesan, 8 religious), 23 lay religious (14 brothers, 9 sisters) and 7 seminarians.

== History ==
- Established on 12 May 1949 as Apostolic Prefecture of Kankan, on territory canonically split off from the Apostolic Vicariate of French Guinea
- Promoted on 17 November 1993 as Diocese of Kankan.

== Bishops ==
=== Ordinaries ===
Apostolic Prefects of Kankan

- Father Maurizio Le Mailloux, Holy Ghost Fathers (C.S.Sp.- (1950.03.17 – death 1957)
- Apostolic Administrator Gérard-Paul-Louis-Marie de Milleville, C.S.Sp. (1957 – 1958.12.14), while Metropolitan Archbishop of Conakry (Guinea) (1955.09.14 – retired 1962.03.10), later Titular Archbishop of Gabala (1962.03.10 – 2007.01.12) as Auxiliary Bishop of Fortaleza (Brazil) (1967 – 1984), Apostolic Administrator of Basse-Terre (Guadeloupe, French) (1968.01.29 – 1970.10.05); died 2207
- Fr. Jean B. Coudray, C.S.Sp. (1958.12.14 – death 1979)
- Apostolic Administrator Robert Sarah (1979 – 1993.11.17), while Metropolitan Archbishop of Conakry (Guinea) (1979.08.13 – 2001.10.01), President of Episcopal Conference of the Guinea (1985 – 2001); later Roman Curia official as Secretary of Congregation for the Evangelization of Peoples (2001.10.01 – 2010.10.07), Vice-Grand Chancellor of Pontifical Urbaniana University (2001.10.01 – 2010.10.07), President of Pontifical Council “Cor unum” (2010.10.07 – 2014.11.24), created Cardinal-Deacon of S. Giovanni Bosco in Via Tuscolana (2010.11.20 [2011.01.30] – ...), Prefect of Roman Congregation for Divine Worship and the Discipline of the Sacraments (2014.11.24 – ...)

Suffragan Bishops of Kankan

- Vincent Coulibaly (1993.11.17 – 2003.05.06), first Guinean incumbent; later Metropolitan Archbishop of Conakry (Guinea) (2003.05.06 – ...), staying on shortly as Apostolic Administrator of Kankan (2003.07.31 – 2004), President of Episcopal Conference of the Guinea (2007.12 – 2013.01)
- Emmanuel Félémou (2007.01.05 - 2021.03.01), President of Episcopal Conference of the Guinea (2013.01 – 2018.05.11); no previous prelature.
- Alexis Aly Tagbino (2021.11.20 -)

=== Auxiliary Bishop ===
- Alexis Aly Tagbino (2016-2021)

== See also ==
- List of Catholic dioceses in Gabon
- Roman Catholicism in Gabon

== Sources and external links ==
- GCatholic.org, with Google satellite photo
- Catholic Hierarchy
