= Tumaco-La Tolita culture =

Pre-Columbian South American culture (c. 350 BCE – 400 CE)

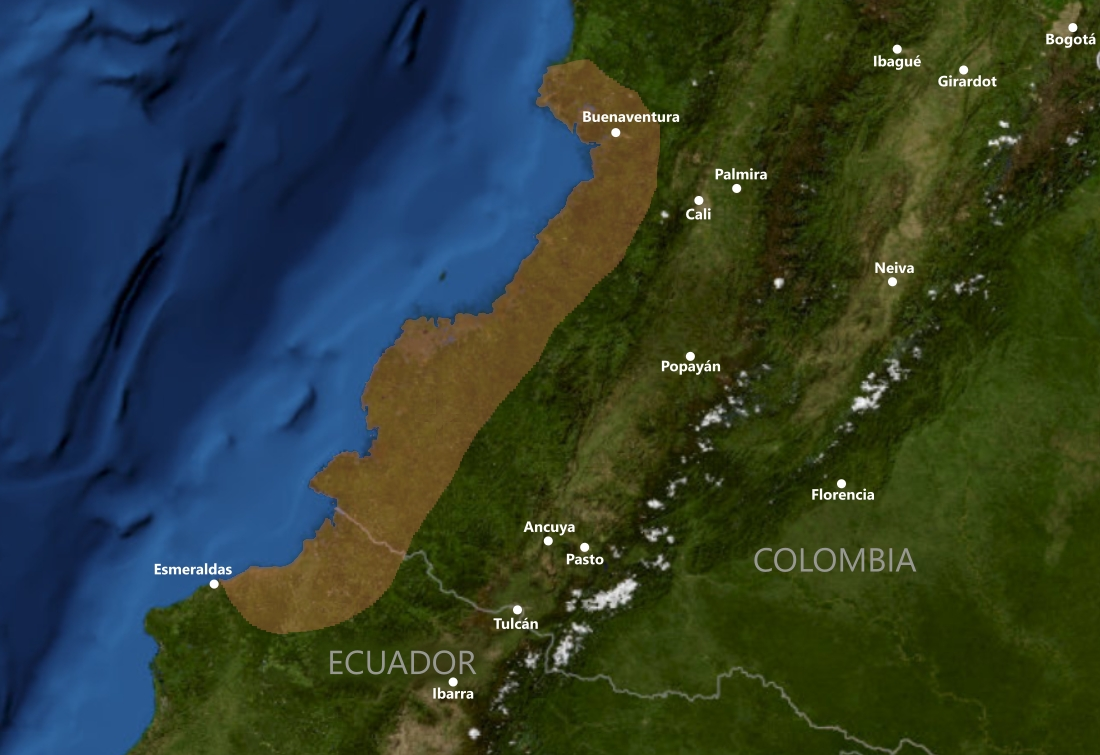
- Map of the area occupied by Tumaco-La Tolita culture
- Geographical range: Coast of Colombia and Ecuador
- Period: Pre-Columbian era
- Dates: 350 BC – 400 AD
- Major sites: La Tolita, Isla del Morro, Inguapí
- Preceded by: Chorrera culture
- Followed by: Atacames culture

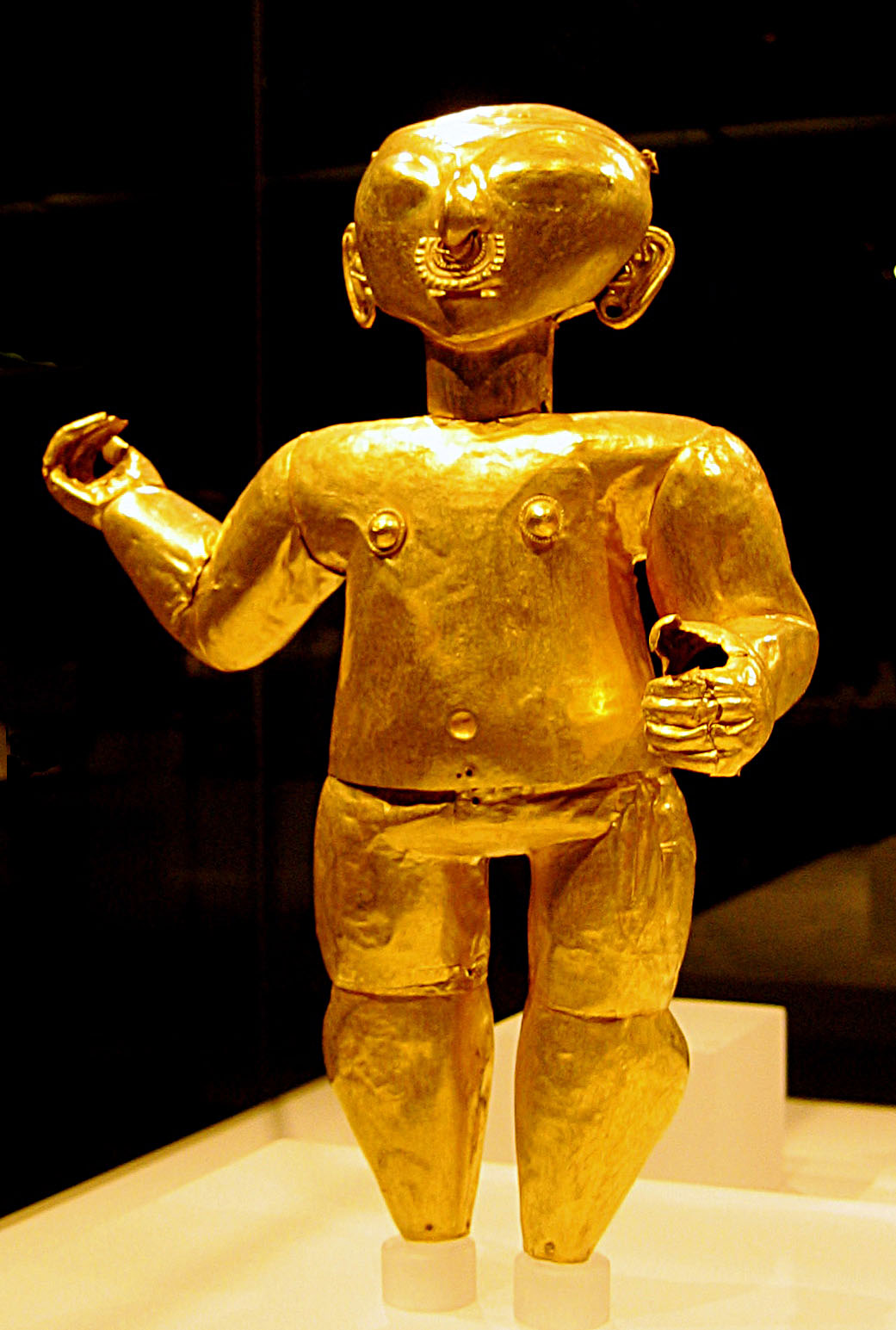
Tumaco-La Tolita gold figure

The Tumaco-La Tolita culture or Tulato culture, also known as the Tumaco culture in Colombia or as the Tolita culture in Ecuador, was an archaeological culture that inhabited the northern coast of Ecuador and the southern coast of Colombia during the Pre-Columbian era. It takes its name from the two most representative archaeological sites of the culture, the Isla del Morro in the city of Tumaco and the Isla de la Tolita. They are known for the construction of earthen mounds known as Tolas, ceramic crafts and especially metalworking, since they handled gold with great skill and were also the first artisans in the world known to work with platinum.

== Geography and climate ==
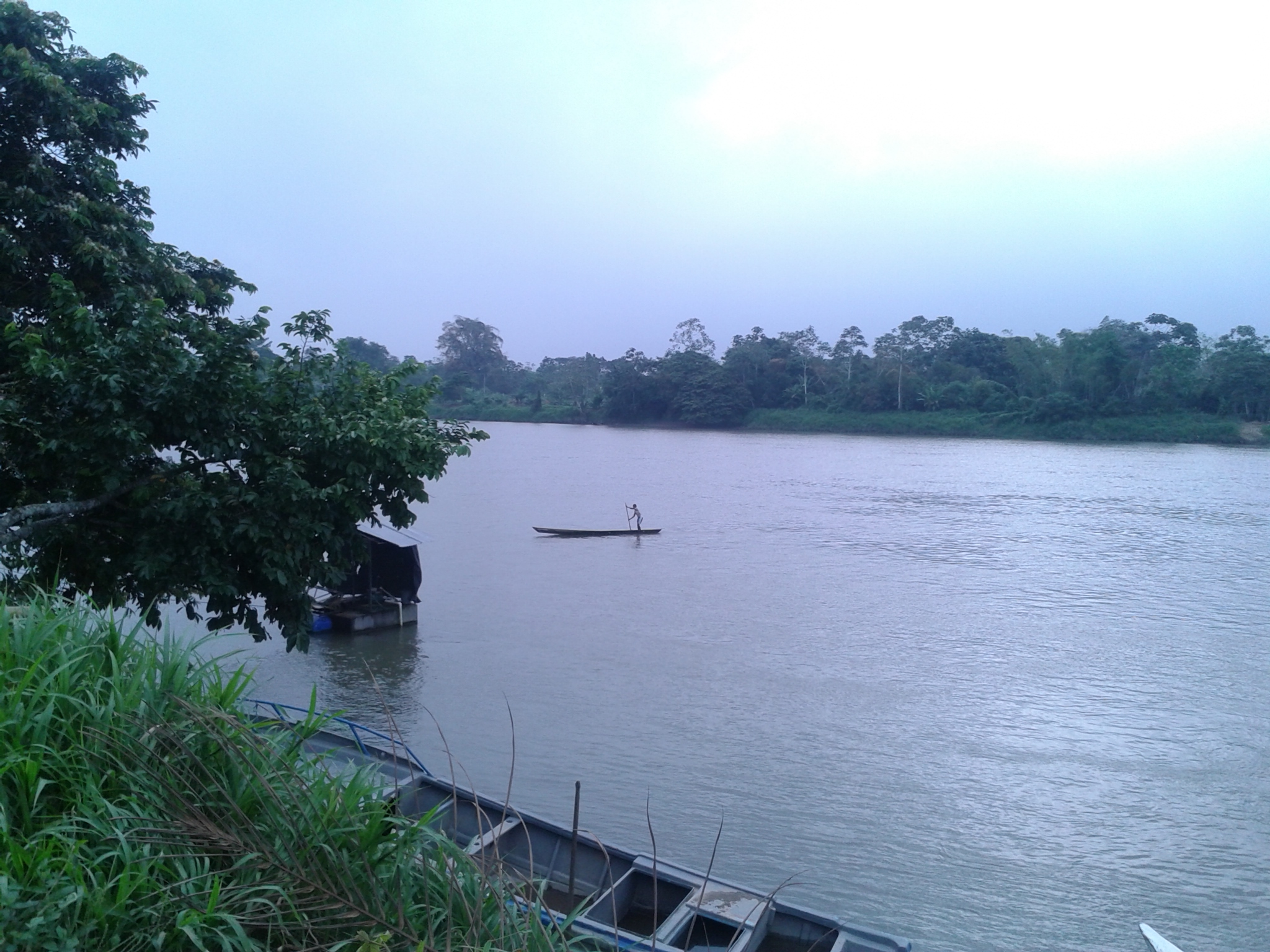
Landscape of the lower Mira River

The Tumaco-La Tolita culture lived on the coasts of the present-day province of Esmeraldas in Ecuador and extended as far north as Buenaventura, in Colombia. The region has a warm climate, with temperatures of 27 or 28 °C. The landscape of the region is dominated by large and fertile plains covered by tropical rainforest, while the coastal zone is covered by mangrove forests. Riversare abundant in the area, such as the Cayapas River, the Mataje River, the Mira River, the Patía River, etc. The large number of rivers provided Tumaco-La Tolita people with excellent communication routes with the Andean highlands.

== History ==
The origins of the Tumaco culture go back to the first known settlers of the region, the Chorrera culture. They arrived at the beginning of the first millennium BC, and by the year 600 BC. C. the Island of La Tolita was inhabited for the first time. With the passage of time their culture slowly transformed and became unique to the region, by 350 BC. C. their culture had already become what is known as Tumaco-La Tolita. Some researchers think that there were large migrations from Mesoamerica that influenced the Tolita culture on its origins, although this hypothesis has not been proven.

The peak of the Tolita culture lasted around 700 years, after which new cultural transformations took place, these are marked by the appearance of the El Morro cultural phase in AD 350. C. in the area of Tumaco, which was characterized by a totally different ceramic style, and by the abandonment of the Island of La Tolita around 400 AD. C.

A transition period occurred between 500 and 700 AD. C., it was marked by the gradual depopulation of the coastal regions. Its causes are unknown.

=== Discovery, looting and research ===
The professor Marshal H. Saville was one of the first to study the Tumaco-La Tolita culture.

The first archaeological studies of the Tumaco-La Tolita Culture were carried out by non-Ecuadorian or Colombian archaeologists. The first of them was the American Marshall Saville, who visited the Island of la Tolita and surrounding areas of Esmeraldas and Nariño attracted by the news of the incredible gold hoards found there, he published the results of his research in 1910 already using and the name of Tolita Culture. The gold and platinum artifacts from La Tolita became very popular after this publication in museums around the world. The German archaeologist Max Uhle visited the island in 1925 and published the first maps of the site, in which the Tolas that give name to the place can be seen.

In 1949, the American John Rowe published the first work on this culture in Colombia, and, in 1955, the Colombian Julio César Cubillos published his studies of the area, already using the name Tumaco Culture, despite the fact that both Cubillos and Rowe were well aware that the same culture had already been named as La Tolita on the other side of the border. The Austrian Gerardo Reichel-Dolmatoff carried out the first Carbon-14 dating studies on the Colombian side, while the American Betty Meggers began the task of the chronological periodization of the Tolita culture on the Ecuadorian side in 1966.

These first researchers were highly influenced by the theories of diffusionism, which proposed the existence of nuclear zones of high culture, from which it spread to peripheral zones. They considered that Tumaco-La Tolita was a peripheral area, which is why Max Uhle proposed the theory of the Mayoid Cultures, in which he argued that all the transformations of La Tolita were caused to waves of migrants from Mesoamerica.

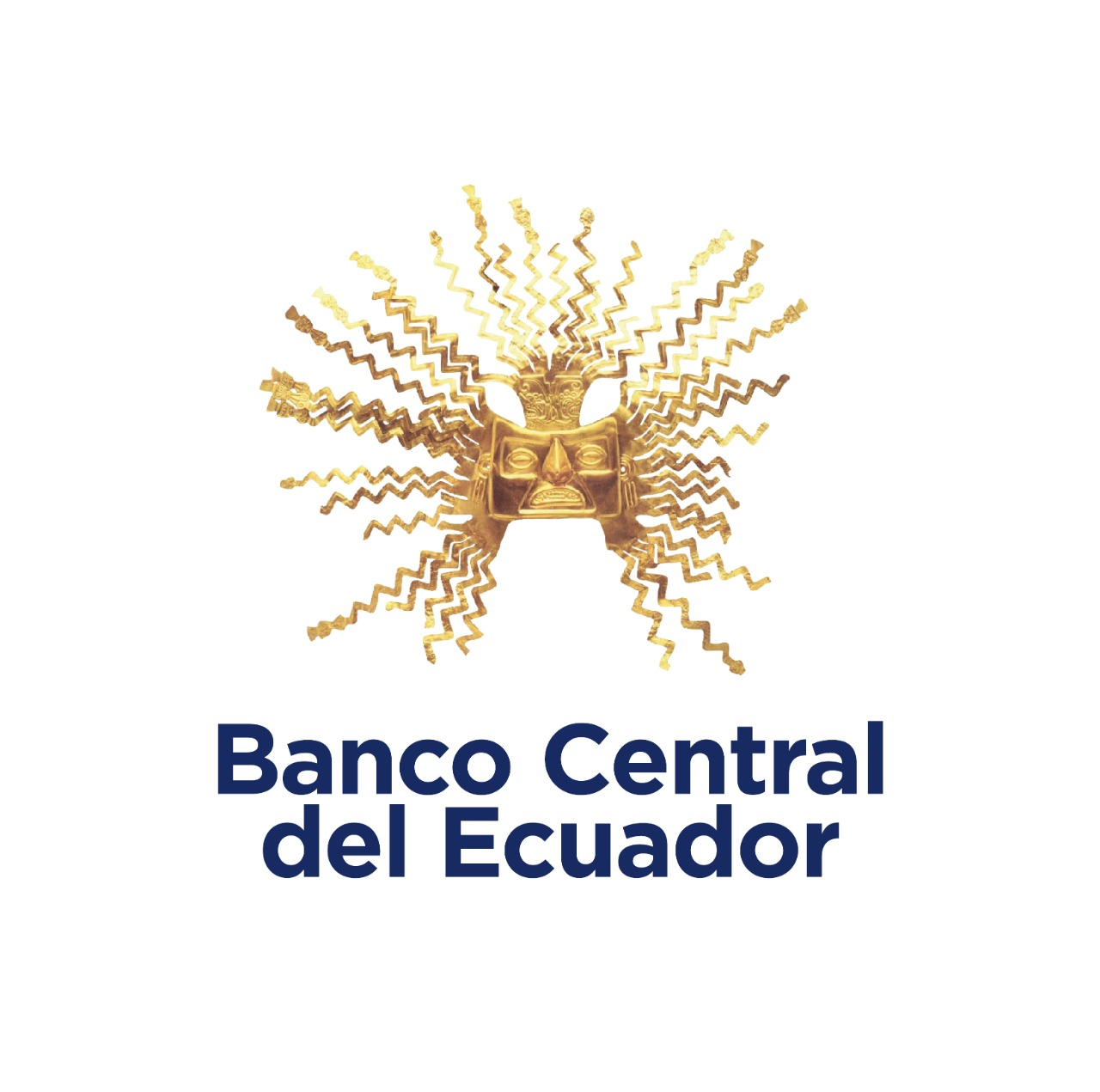
The Golden sun of La Tolita is the logo of the Central Bank of Ecuador.

The Tumaco-La Tolita region became a very attractive place for scholars, but also attractive for treasure hunters, who systematically looted a large number of tombs of this culture in search of precious metal objects that would later be melted and turned into ingots. Among the main buyers of gold from the region were the Bank of the Republic in Colombia and the Central Bank of Ecuador, which sought to increase their gold reserves. It was these same banks that were in charge of creating the Gold Museum and the Central Bank Museum (today known as the National Museum) in Colombia and Ecuador respectively to preserve the most outstanding pieces. The Central Bank of Ecuador would even take a presumably Tolita piece as its logo, the so-called Golden sun of the Central Bank.

In the decades that followed, more exhaustive studies were carried out on this culture, although they were heavily influenced by the international border that divides the Tumaco-La Tolita territories. Some of the works that stand out are the excavations of Francisco Valdez in the Island of la Tolita, those of José Alcina Franch in the province of Esmeraldas, those of Jean François Bouchard and those of Diogenes Patiño in the Tumaco region or the extensive study of Tolita iconography by María Fernanda Ugalde.

== Material culture ==
From the remains of the Tolita material culture, metallurgy and pottery are the ones that stand out the most, although there is also evidence of the use of stone, shells, horns, bone, wood, basketry, textiles, feathers, etc.

=== Metallurgy ===
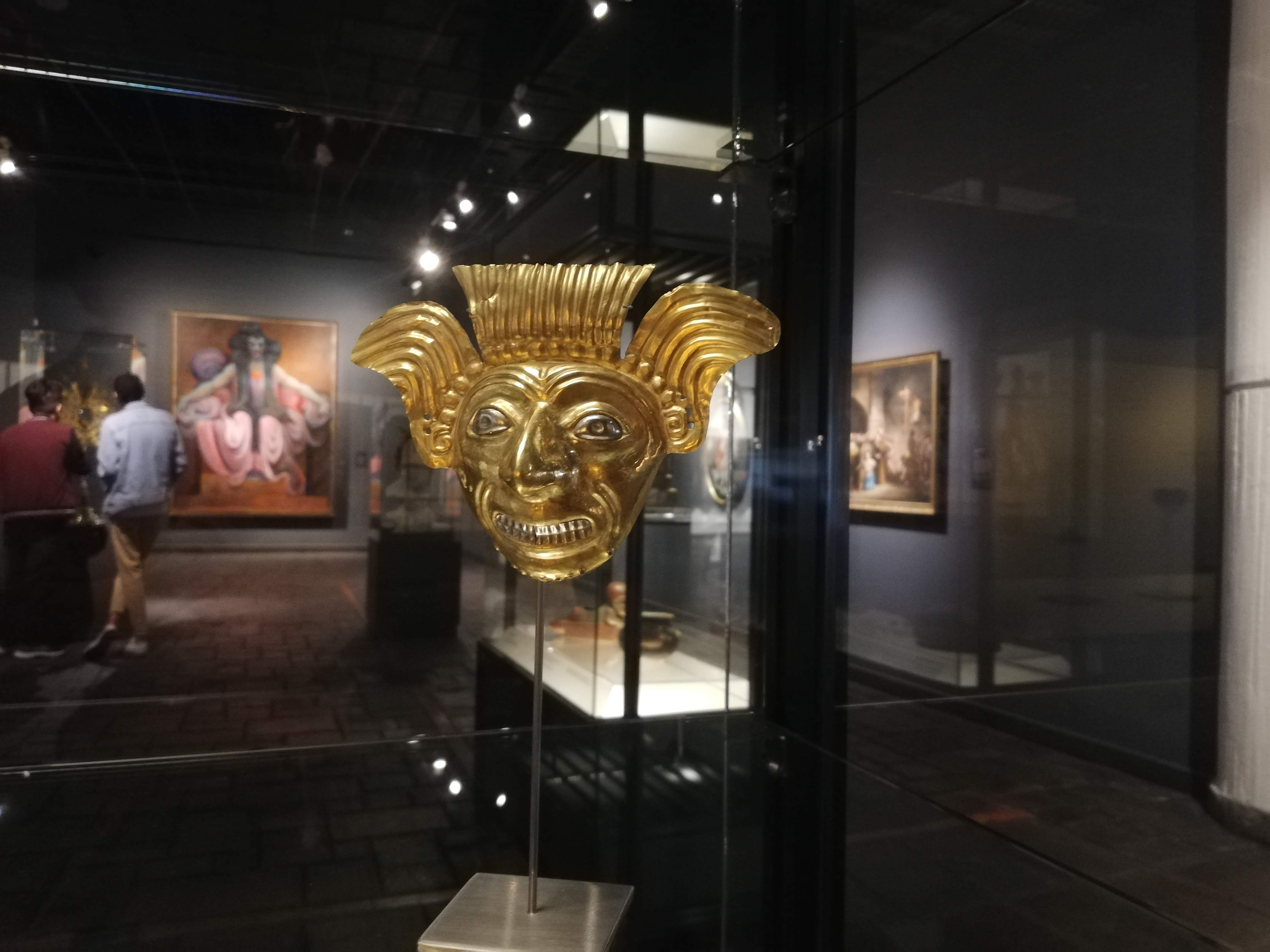
Gold mask with platinum eyes and teeth exhibited at the MuNa, Quito

The artisans of the Tumaco culture excelled in the work of gold, platinum and tumbaga (an alloy between gold and copper). These metals were mainly used for the manufacture of artistic objects. A large number of metallic masks and body ornaments such as beads, rings, diadems, bracelets, dental inlays, and even gold threads were made, which were presumably used to decorate clothing. Although some copper tools were also made, such as chisels, tweezers, needles, pins, hooks, etc.

The earliest evidence of the use of metals in the region comes from the archaeological site called Las Balsas, near the Islandof la Tolita, where a sheet of gold was found that was dated between 915 and 780 BC.

The metal-smiths of the Tolita culture were the first in the world to work the platinum, at least 1,400 years before European blacksmiths, who did not use this metal until the 18th century. This metal has a very high melting point, which was not achieved until the Industrial Revolution, so the Tolita blacksmiths had to develop techniques to work the metal without melting it, one of them is called sintering, which is achieved by mixing platinum powder in gold or silver. The contrast of the white color of the platinum with the yellow of the gold was used to create bi-colored pieces.

=== Pottery ===
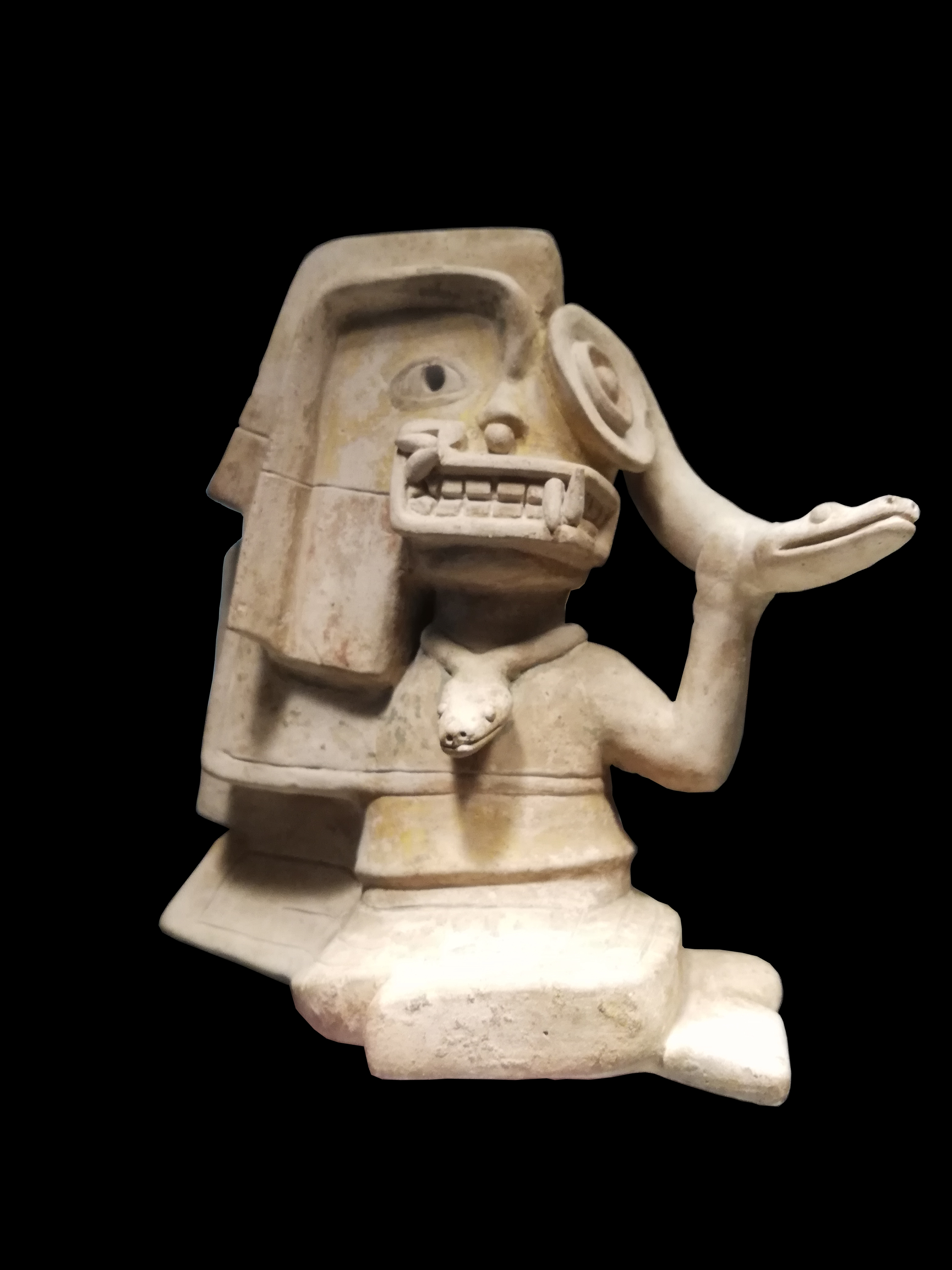
The so-called "Picasso Tolita" is one of the most famous Tumaco-La Tolita ceramic sculptures. MuNa, Quito.

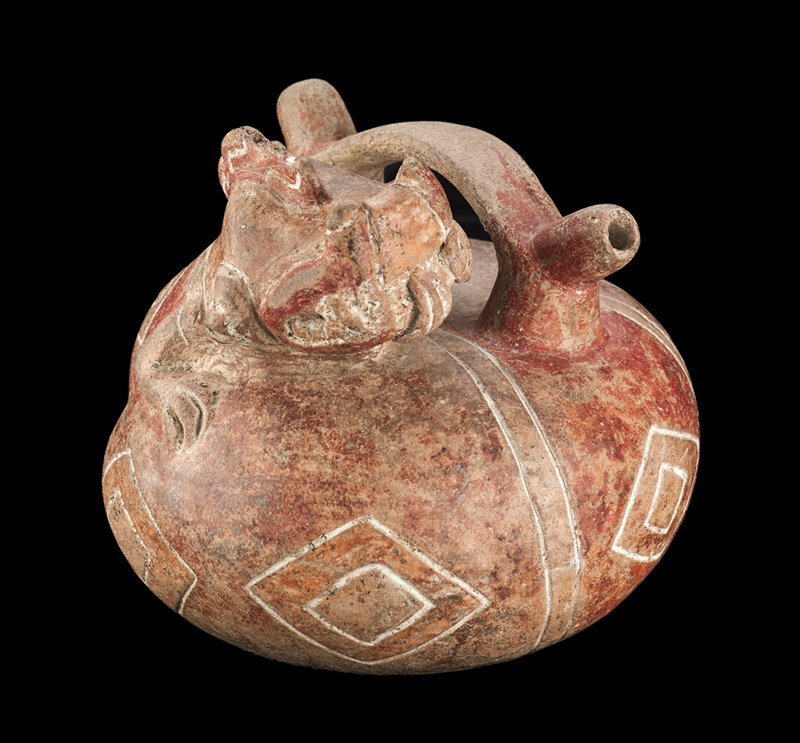
Zoomorphic alcarraza

Ceramic was used for manufacture of utensils for daily use as well as sculptures and figurines.

They made vessels of different shapes and for different purposes. The most common are alcarrazas, globular vessels, vases, bowls and plates, these last two types are usually presented as tripod vessels. These vessels were profusely decorated. Red paint was very common, and was sometimes combined with white, orange, cream, brown, or black. Other decoration techniques such as negative painting or incisions with geometric motifs were also used.

Other ceramic utensils were spindle whorls and graters.

They made a large number of ceramic figurines, there are anthropomorphic, zoomorphic and hybrid. The anthropomorphic figurines display clothing and body adornments, some carry musical instruments, others appear to be ill, show cranial deformation or portray elder people. The zoomorphic figurines represent a great variety of animals; fish, mammals, reptiles, birds, etc. And the hybrid figurines represent the mixture between animals and humans, one of the most common representations is the man–jaguar hybrid. Some figures, with both typically masculine and feminine features could be interpreted as potentially non-binary or transgender, similar figures are also found in the Bahía and Jama Coaque cultures.

=== Stone ===
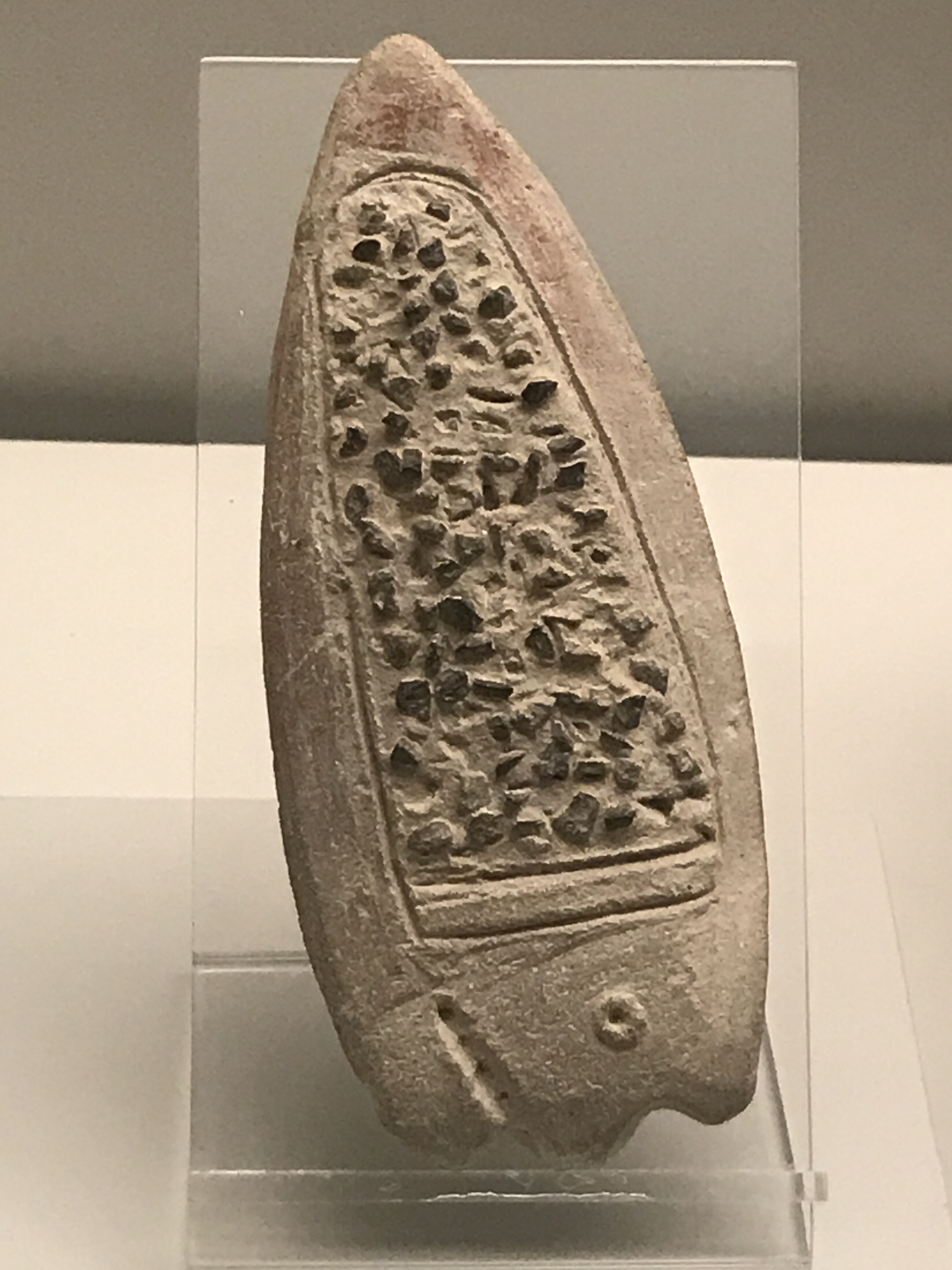
Ceramic grater with stone inlays in the shape of a fish

Stone is scarce in the places that were occupied by the Tumaco-La Tolita culture, materials such as andesite and basalt were probably imported from the foothills of the Andean mountains. Studies carried out on obsidian artifacts recovered from Tolita deposits have shown that the vast majority of obsidian was imported from the Mullumica quarries, near the current city of Quito, located in the mountains.

Lithic materials were used mainly for the manufacture of tools and utensils such as grinding stones, polished stone axes, weights for fishing nets, etc. Small stones were embedded in some ceramic graters to make the rough surfaces required for grating. Basalt, obsidian, chert and limonite flakes have also been found that were surely used as scrapers or knives.

=== Other materials ===
Tools such as needles, pins, awls, etc. were made of bone and deer antler. Although these materials were also used for artistic purposes, such as carving statuettes, flutes, etc. Sometimes shells such as spondylus and mother of pearl were inlaid.

A large range of organic materials were probably used, but they have not survived to the present day due to decay, although there are some indirect sources that hint the use of these materials. Among these is the wood for the manufacture of canoes and the use of bahareque (use of reeds and mud to construct walls) for the construction of houses, which have been represented in ceramic sculptures. On the other hand, the existence of spinning tools such as spindle whorls and the figurines with representations of clothing show the manufacture of textiles.

== Architecture and engineering ==
=== Channels, raised fields and causeways ===
The plains of the Tumaco-La Tolita region present a great challenge for intensive agriculture, since these lands are prone to flooding during the rainy season, making agriculture impossible for a few months every year. To deal with this problem, the farmers of the Tolita culture resorted to the construction of channels and camellones. This technique consists of digging elongated channels and accumulating the earth that is extracted right next to them, thus creating an elongated raised fields and known as camellones. The water will accumulate in the channels while the camellones remain dry, allowing cultivation even in the rainy season.

This farming system brings several advantages in addition to keeping the land dry. The deeper channels that remain waterlogged year-round also serve as irrigation water reservoirs and attract fish and other animals that can be hunted. Within these channels organic matter accumulates and slowly decomposes to become a very fertile layer of humus, which can be collected and putted on top of the camellones, this helps to maintain both the depth of the channels and the fertility of the soil.

Causeway were built using this same technique, probably with the aim of improving mobility between cultivation areas during floods.

Although the intensive use of this irrigation systems began during the Tolita period, they were first used during the Chorrera period. These fields continued to be used even after the disappearance of the Tolita culture.

=== Houses and temples ===
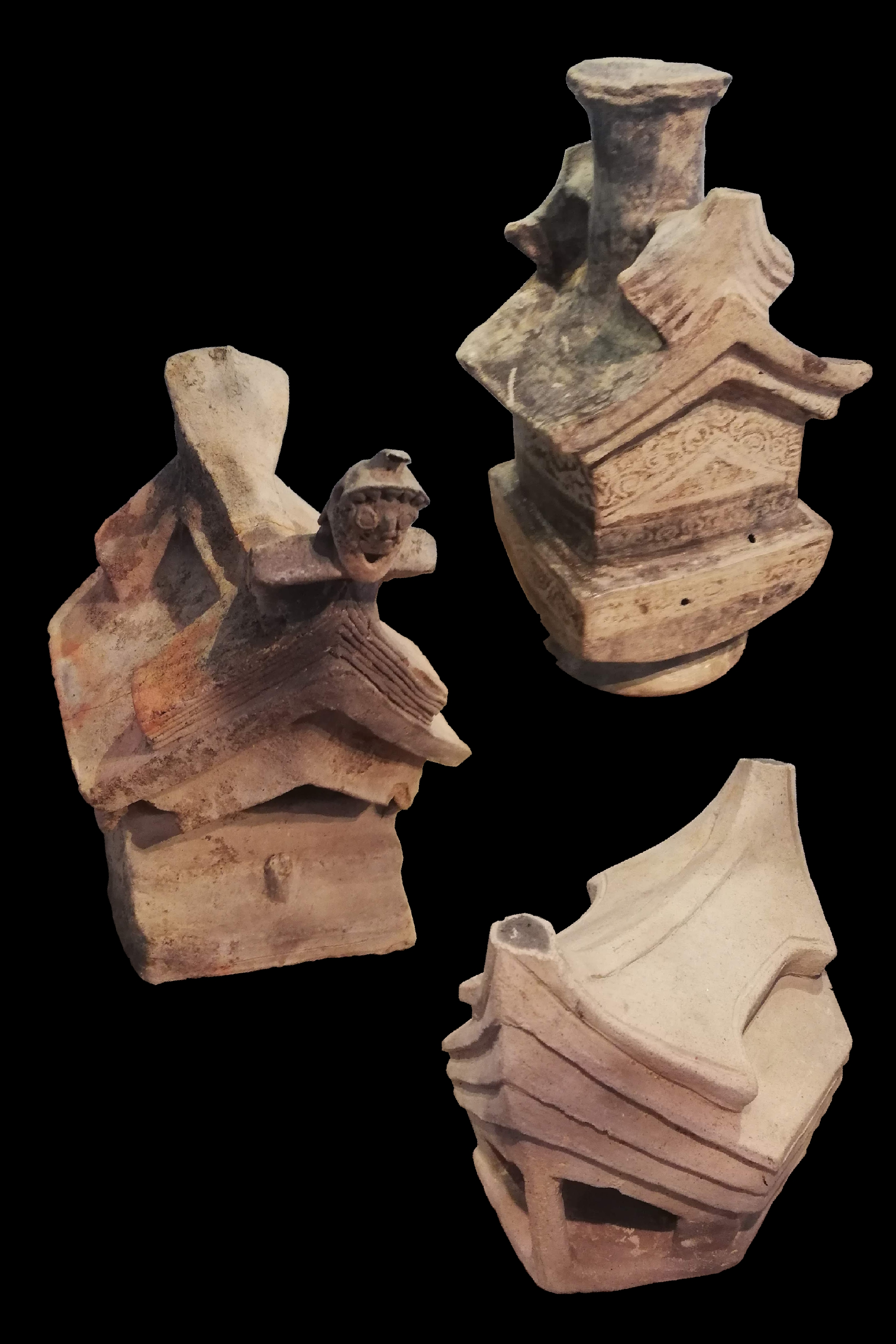
House models exhibited in the Casa del Alabado Museum of Pre-Columbian Art

No Tolita house has been found; this indicates that they built using perishable materials that disappeared over time.

The only surviving evidence of the construction of houses or temples are postholes that were dug to anchor wooden poles that would have supported the roof of some building. The houses built in flat areas were probably built on piles to protect them from flooding, this construction technique is still in use today in the Tolita region.

In addition to the post holes, there are also models of houses or temples that seem to indicate construction with bahareque, a technique for making walls that consists of covering with mud a skeleton of interwoven reeds. The downward curved roof that some of these models have seems to indicate the use of bamboo|beams, which bend due to the weight of the roof since it is a flexible material. Some of these models show animals incorporated into the architecture.

== Rituals and religion ==
=== Religious art ===
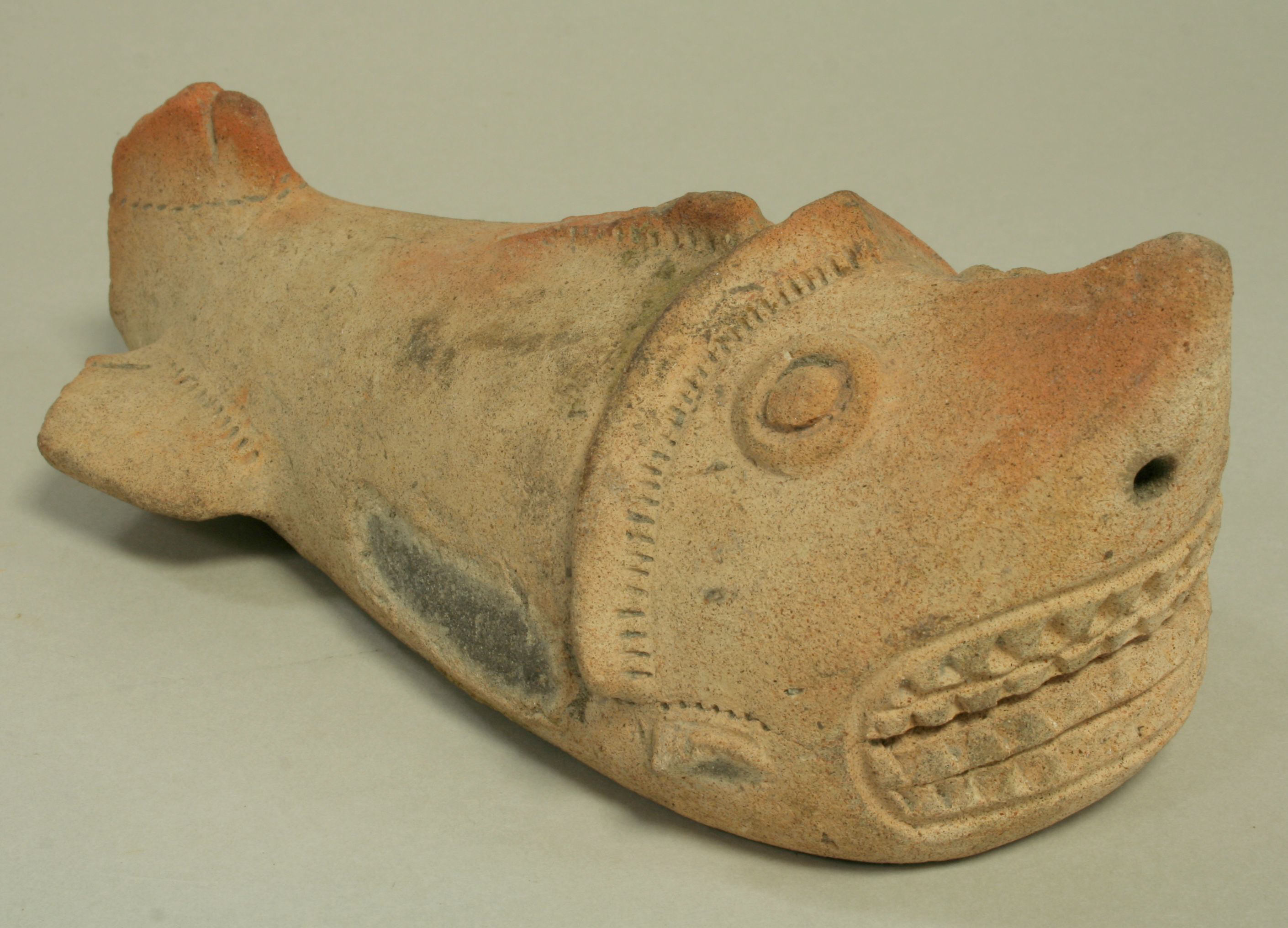
Shark with a headdress exhibited in the Metropolitan Museum of Art

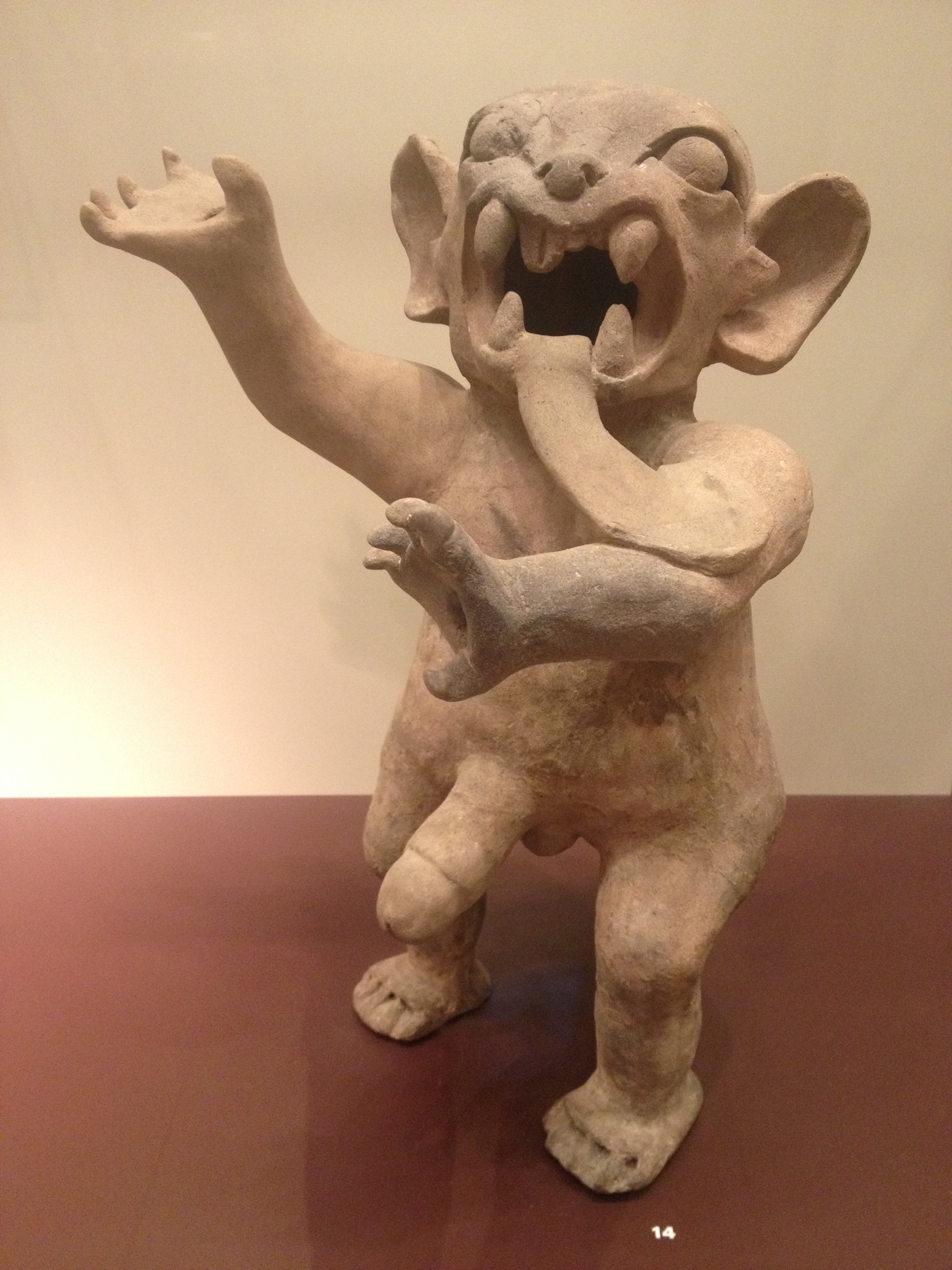
Human–jaguar figurine exhibited in the Israel Museum

The first scholars of the Tumaco-La Tolita culture thought that its art was nothing more than the representation of the natural environment and daily life. Within this line of thought, it was believed that anthropozoomorphic representations (representations of humans with animal parts) were actually representations of shamans who were undergoing a process of spiritual transformation inspired by the consumption of hallucinogenic plants. But this way of understanding the Tolita art has been questioned by current scholars, who believe that Tolita iconography truly represents the opposite of everyday life:deities, mythological ancestors, supernatural characters, and legendary heroes.

Tumaco-La Tolita art represents a large number of animals, both natural and supernatural. Among them, there are 3 that stand out: the jaguar, the shark and the caiman. Some researchers think that these three animals could have been the main deities in Tolita mythology, since each one of them is the greatest predator of the ecosystems where the people of Tumaco-La Tolita would have lived; the jaguar is the largest predator in the jungle, the shark is the largest predator in the sea, and the caiman is the largest predator in rivers and mangrove forests.

Some researchers believe that several of these animals, natural or not, could have represented the mythical ancestors of several families, since there are a large number of human figurines that wear these characters in their headdresses, there are also cases of people who were buried with some of these animals, which would have been sacrificed in honor of the deceased.

=== Ritual decapitation ===
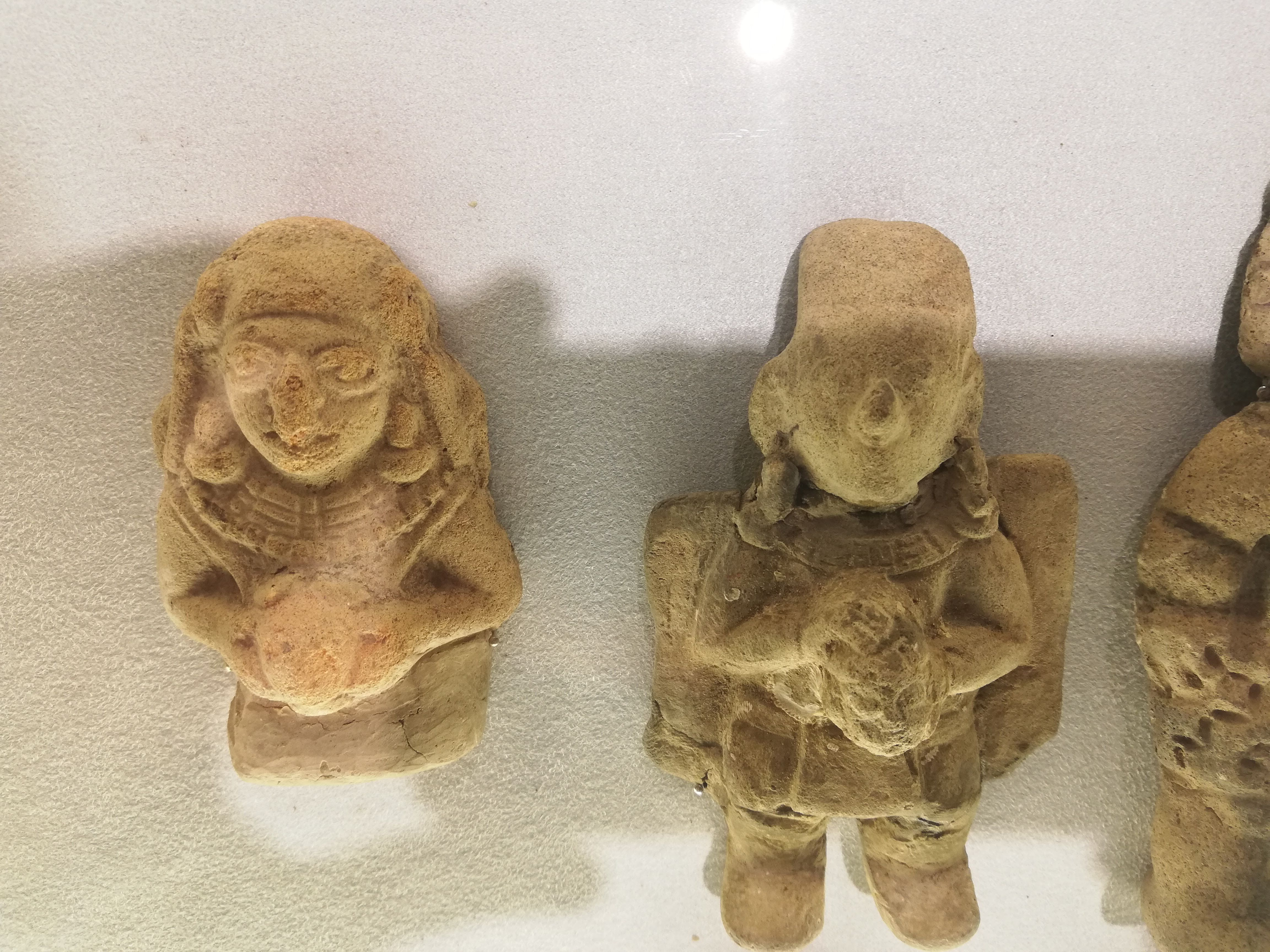
Tolita "decapitators" exposed in the Weilbauer Museum, Quito, Ecuador

The art historian Costanza di Capua proposed the hypothesis that the ritualistic collection of trophy heads was practiced by La Tolita people, and that these perhaps were offerings for a feline-anthropomorphic deity. She also spoke of the possibility of making Tzantzas (shrunken heads). The evidences that could indicate the existence of these practices come mainly from the Tolita art, since there are a large number of figures of human heads made of clay without a body, as well as a type of very peculiar figurines known as "decapitators" which hold a human head. She also identified a skull that could have been ritually decapitated since it has two perforations that were made after the death, like the aforementioned ceramic heads.

But archaeologist María Fernanda Ugalde argued that there is not enough evidence to confirm this hypothesis, since, despite the fact that human skulls have been found separated from the body in Tumaco-La Tolita cemeteries, this phenomenon could be easily explained by the practice of secondary burial, which causes bones to not remain in their proper position within the skeleton. In addition, in several of these headless skeletons, the neck vertebrae do not bear cut marks. To explain the existence of decapitation in the Tolita Art, the archaeologist said the following:

Nos inclinamos a creer que la decapitación ritual en la cultura Tolita, más que una práctica real pudo pertenecer al ámbito mitológico (de manera análoga a la distribución de crucifijos y representaciones de la crucifixión en la iconografía cristiana, lo cual no implica que en todas las áreas culturales donde este objeto está presente se lleven a cabo crucifixiones). ... Las escenas de decapitación y obtención de cabezas trofeo son frecuentes en el área andina, sobre todo en culturas peruanas – Cerro Sechín, Cupisnique, Paracas, Nasca, Moche]; menos implícitamente en Chavín –, y su presencia en la iconografía Tolita podría responder a una difusión de parte de este bagaje religioso-mitológico.

We believe that the ritual beheading in the Tolita culture, rather than a real practice, could belong to the mythological realm (in a similar way to the distribution of crucifixes and representations of the crucifixion in Christian iconography, which does not imply that crucifixions takes place in all cultural areas where this object is present). [...] The scenes of beheading and obtaining trophy heads are frequent in the Andean area, especially in Peruvian cultures – Cerro Sechín, Cupisnique, Paracas, Nasca, Moche]; less implicitly in Chavín -, and its presence in Tolita iconography could respond to a diffusion of part of this religious-mythological baggage.

— María Fernanda Ugalde, Iconografia de la Cultura Tolita

=== Burials ===
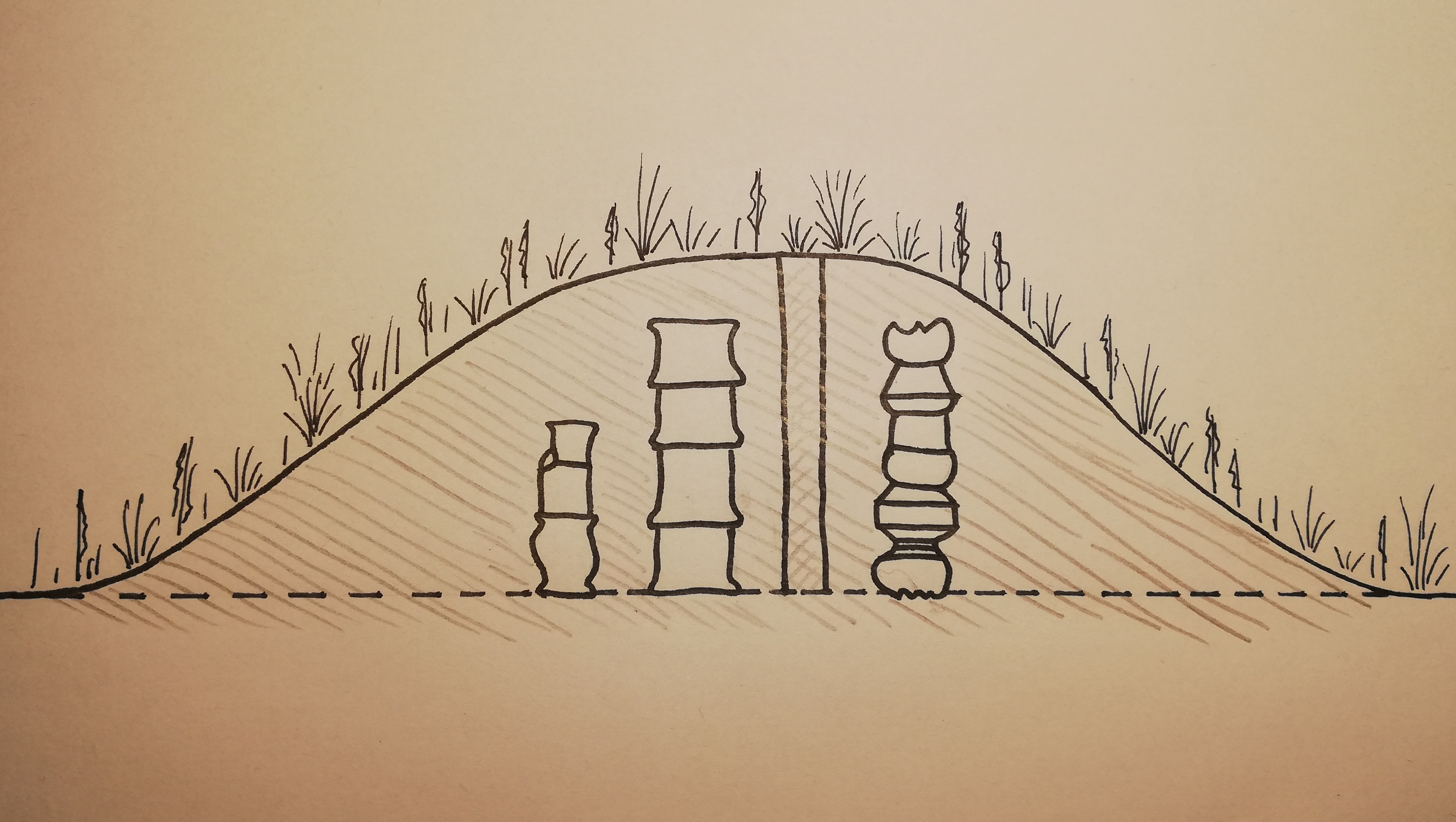
Drawing representing various "timburas" and a chimmeney inside a Tola (mound)

The Tumaco-La Tolita burials are famous for their very rich gold and ceramic grave goods, even though there are burials of such kind, these are only a few burials. A great variety of burial practices existed in this culture. Bodies have been found buried in a variety of positions, there are tombs dug directly above the ground, but there are also tombs inside the Tolas (mounds), both Primary burials (when the body decomposes at the burial place) and secondary burials (when the soft parts of the body decompos before the final burial of the bones), in individual or collective tombs, with very rich offerings or without any offerings. A common type of burial are the so-called Chimney Tombs, which are found inside the tolas. They consist of vertical tubes made from ceramic cylinders called Timburas.

Due to the number of burials that have been found on the Island of La Tolita, it is suspected that this place was a necropolis where people from all over the region were buried.

== Archaeological sites ==
Tumaco-La Tolita archaeological sites are mainly fields of canals and ridges used for cultivation or small towns with Tolas (mounds). There are two sites that stand out: La Tolita and Morro de Tumaco.

=== Island of La Tolita ===
The site known as La Tolita is located on the island of the same name, on the Cayapas River delta in Ecuador. This site originally gave name to this culture.

It is a ceremonial center that consists of a town with a large number of Tolas that form a U-shaped town square, these Tolas give the island its name. The site functioned as a regional necropolis, for this reason abundant burials have been found there.

The first inhabitants of the island settled around 600 BC., they belonged to the Chorrera culture, they built small hamlets scattered throughout the place. It was not until the so-called Classic period (between 200 BC and 75 AD) that the place became a small city and the construction of the Tolas began. It reached its maximum population during the Late Tolita period (between AD 90 and 400), which has been estimated at around 5,000 inhabitants. After the Late Period, the site was abandoned for unknown reasons.

Some researchers think that this place was more than a ceremonial center, according to them it was also a center of political power. That is, it was the capital of a big chiefdom or kingdom that ruled over the Tumaco-La Tolita region.

=== El Morro ===
The site is in El Morro Island, in Tumaco Bay, which today is part of the city of Tumaco. According to the archaeologist Jean François Bouchard, the island was an important port in the times of the Tumaco-La Tolita culture, since it provides an easy access to all the rivers that flow into the Tumaco Bay. The archaeologist interpreted the island as a colony of La Tolita whose main objective was the collection of gold on the shores of Tumaco.

== Gallery ==
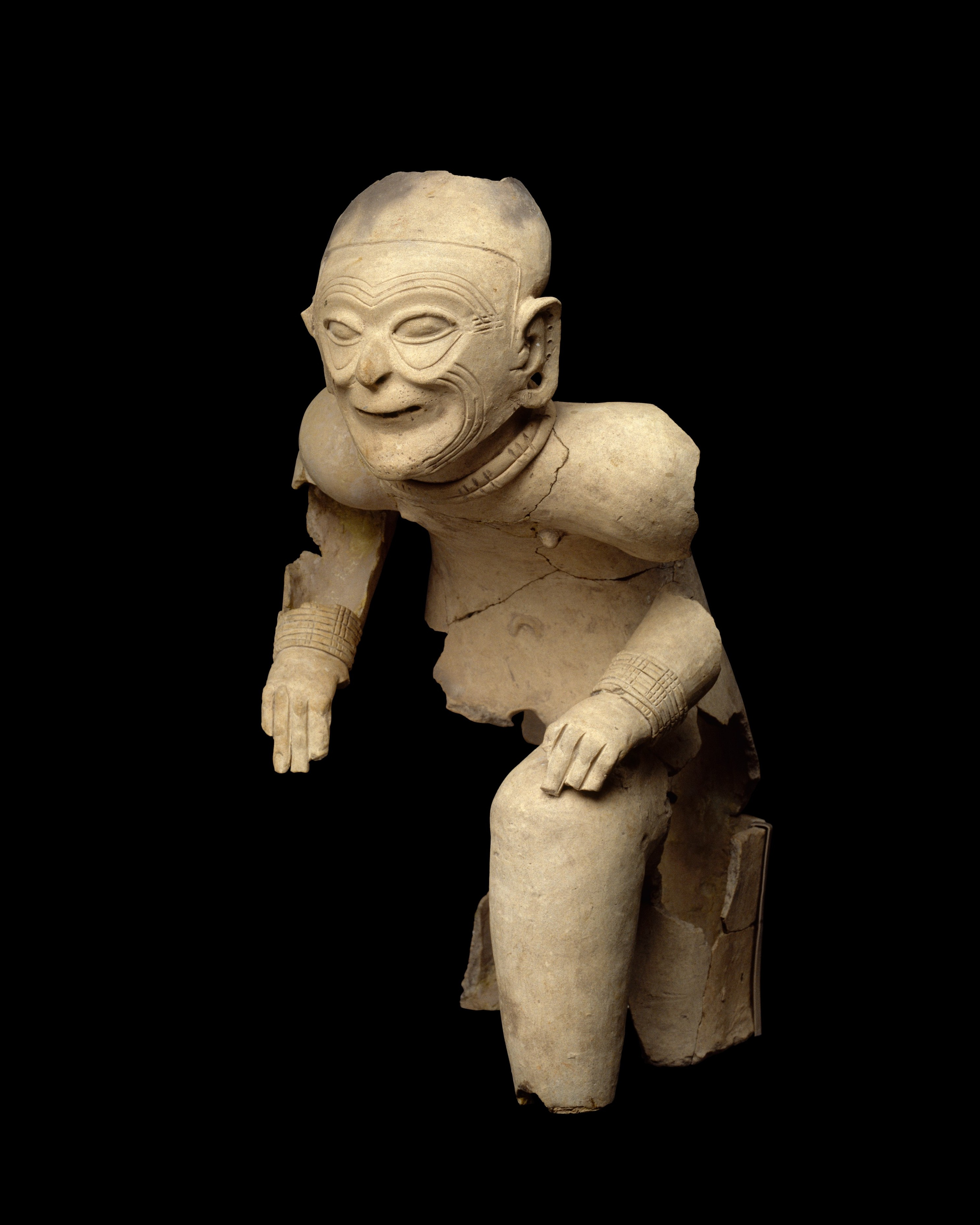
Ceramic portrait of an old man

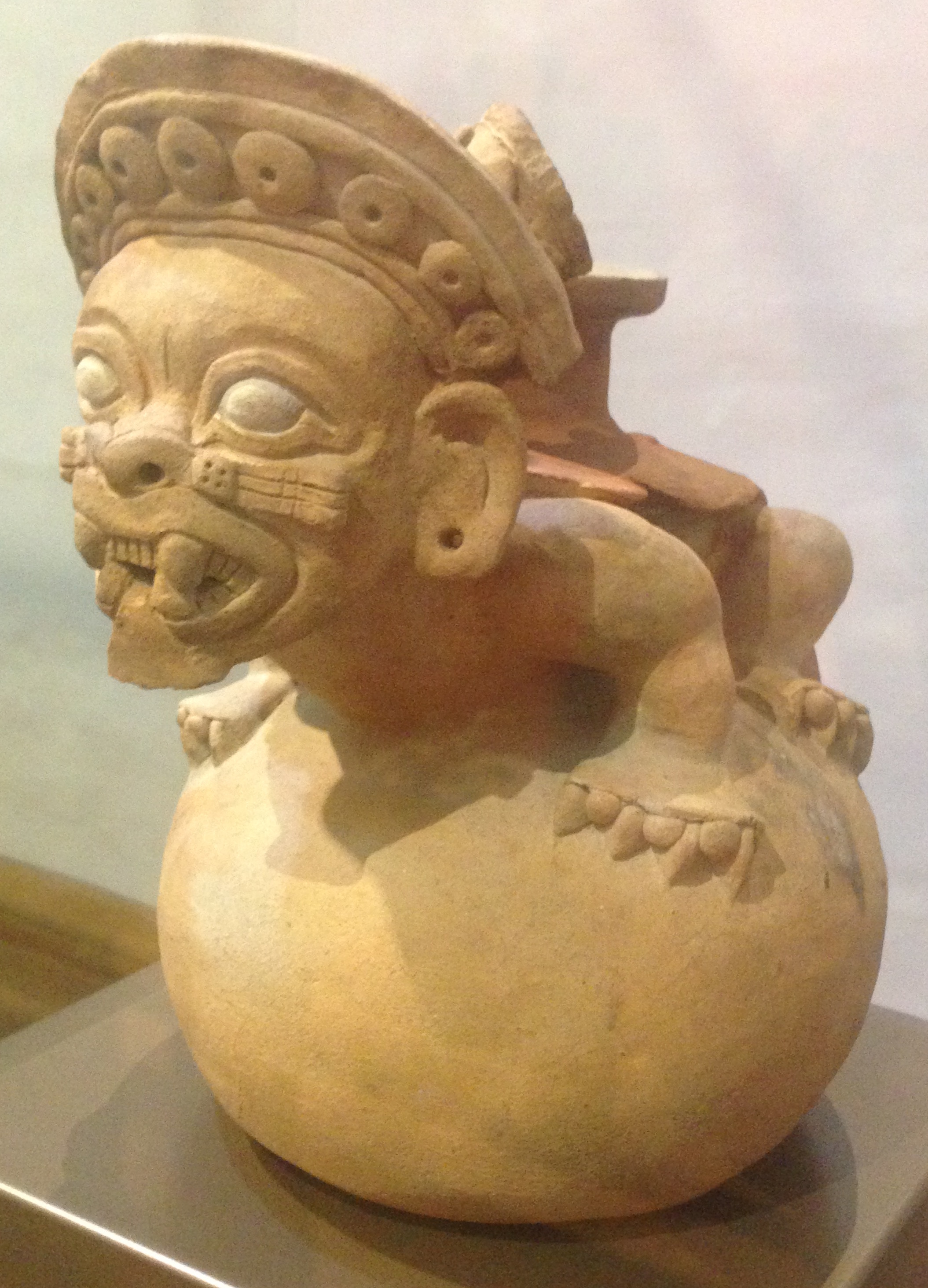
Bottle with an anthropomorphic feline

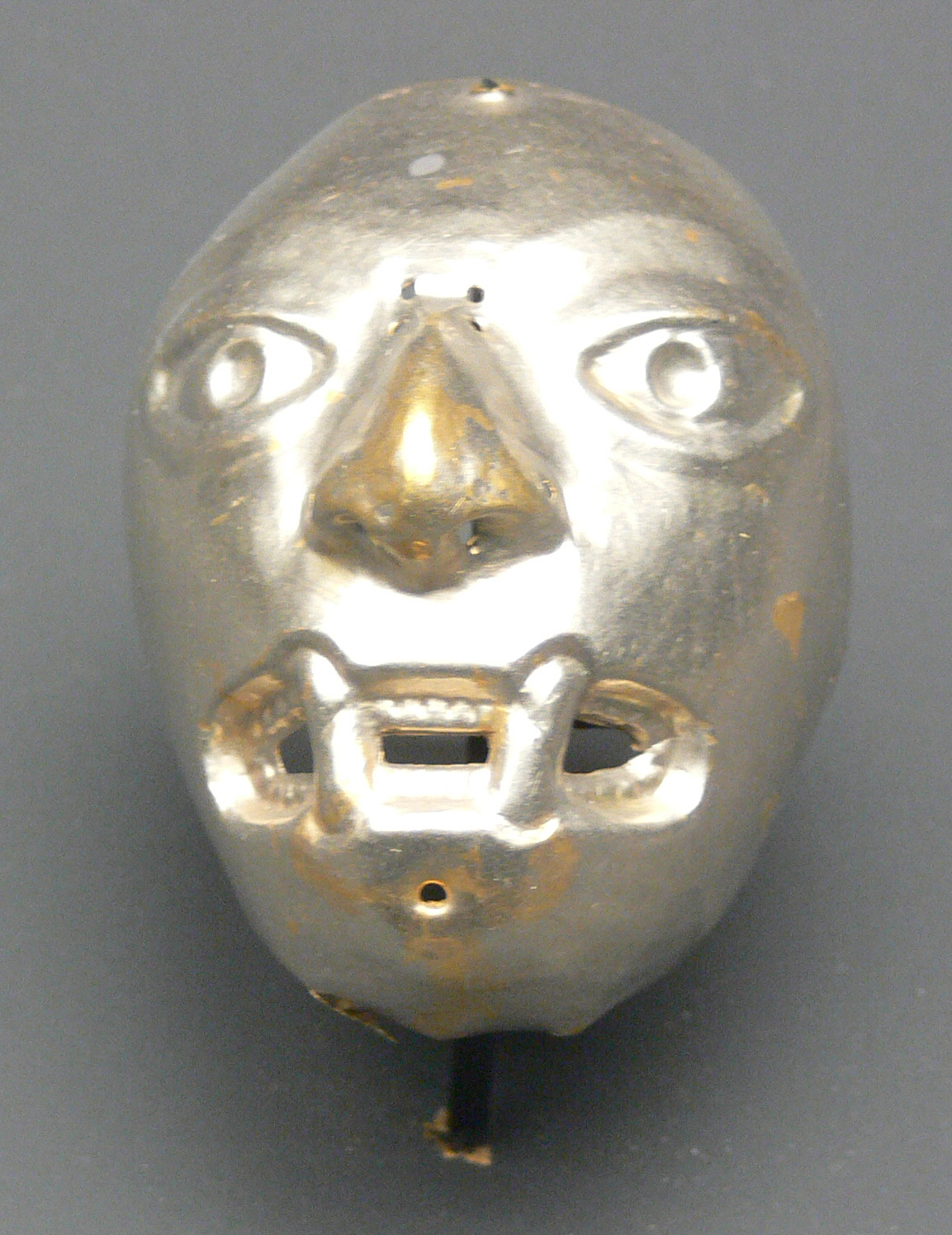
Platinum mask

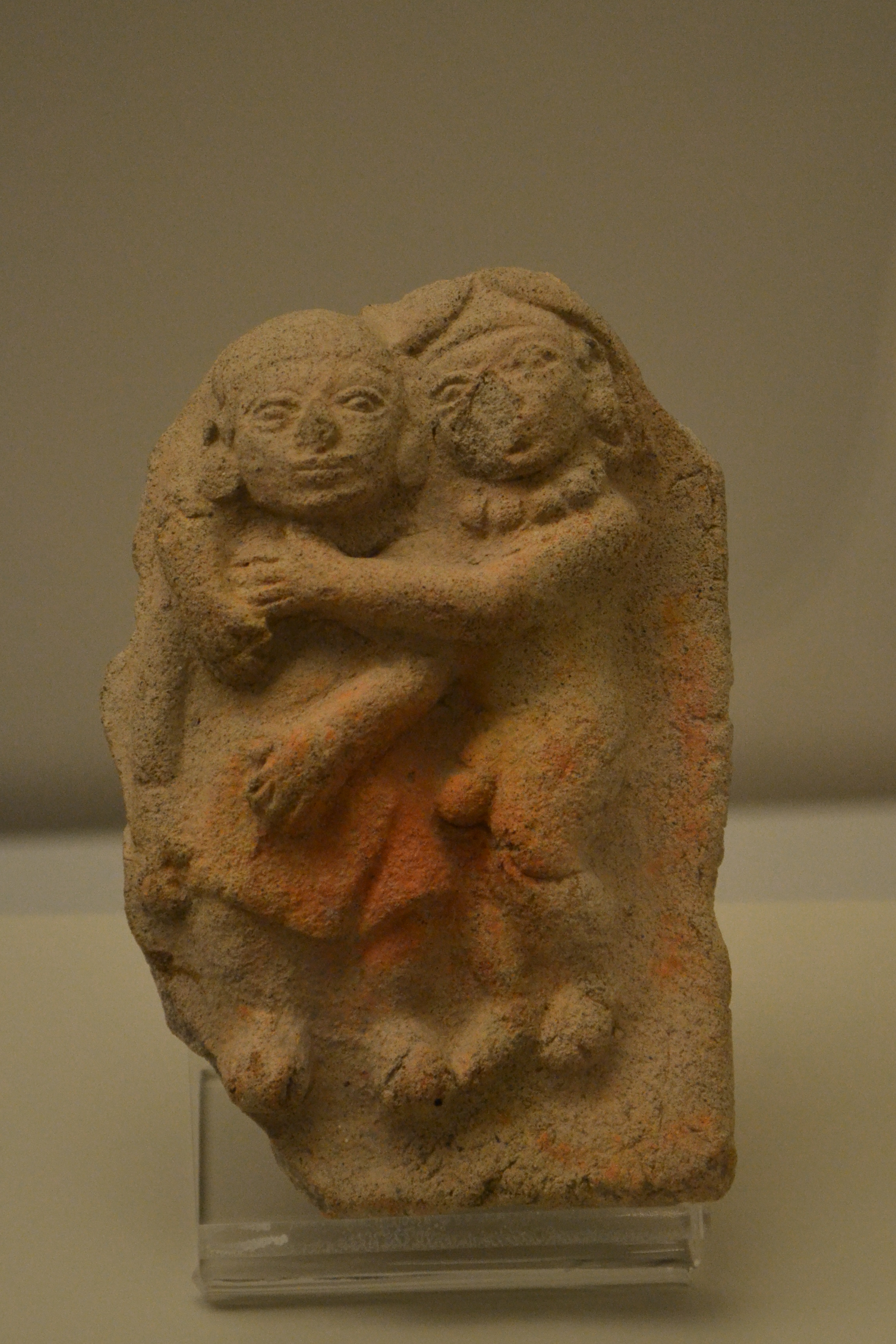
Sexual ceramic figurine

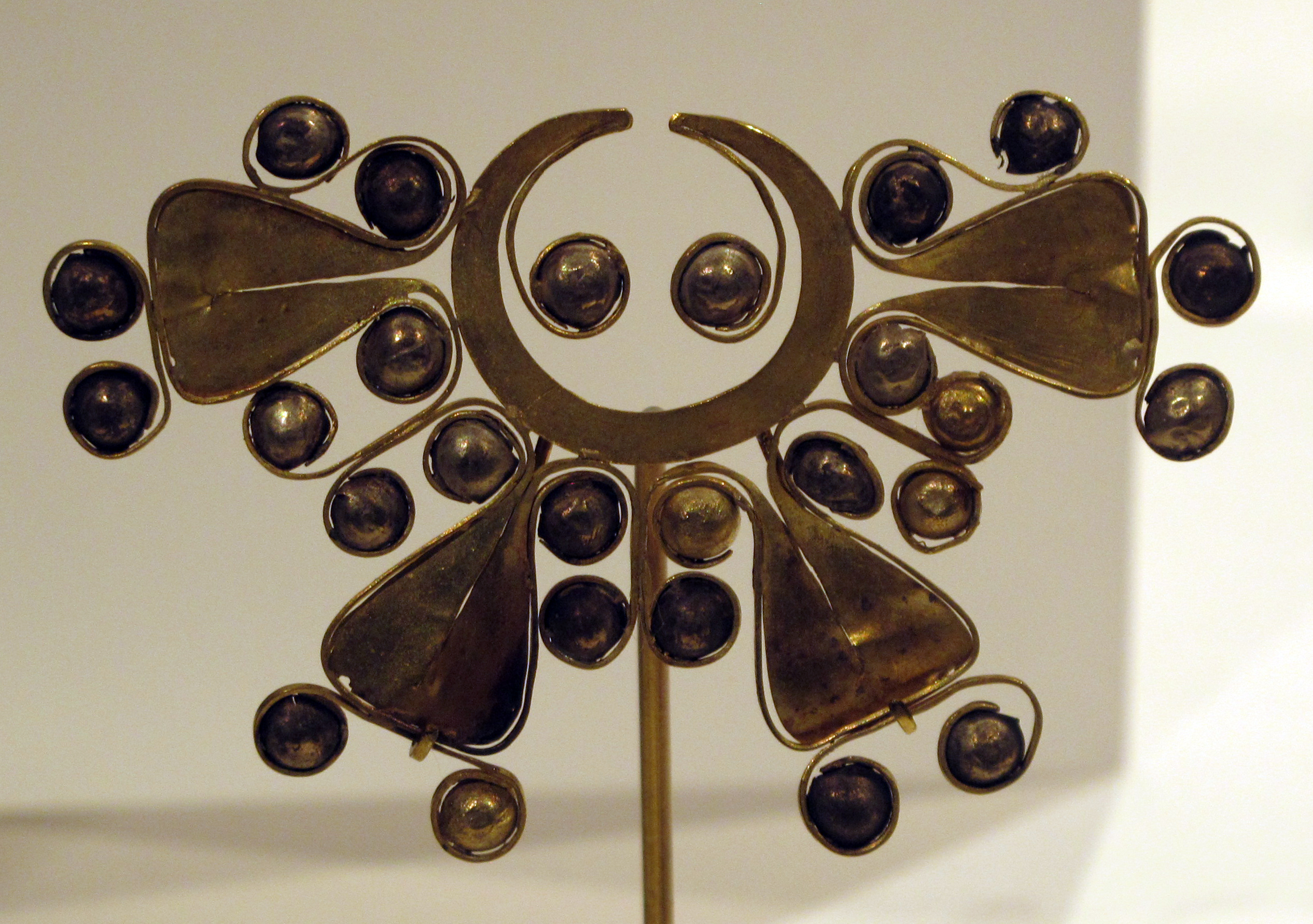
Nose pendant

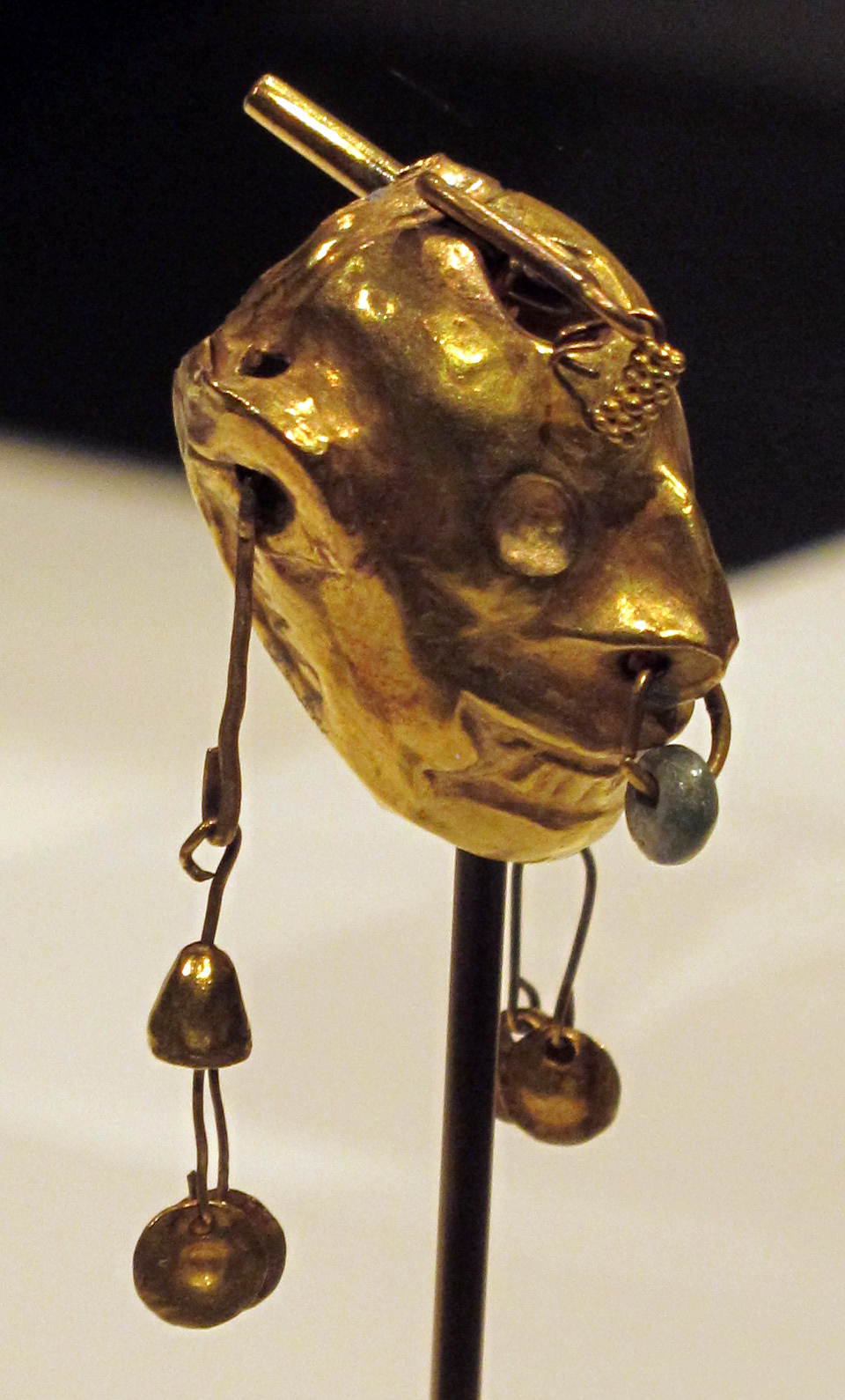
Golden trophy head

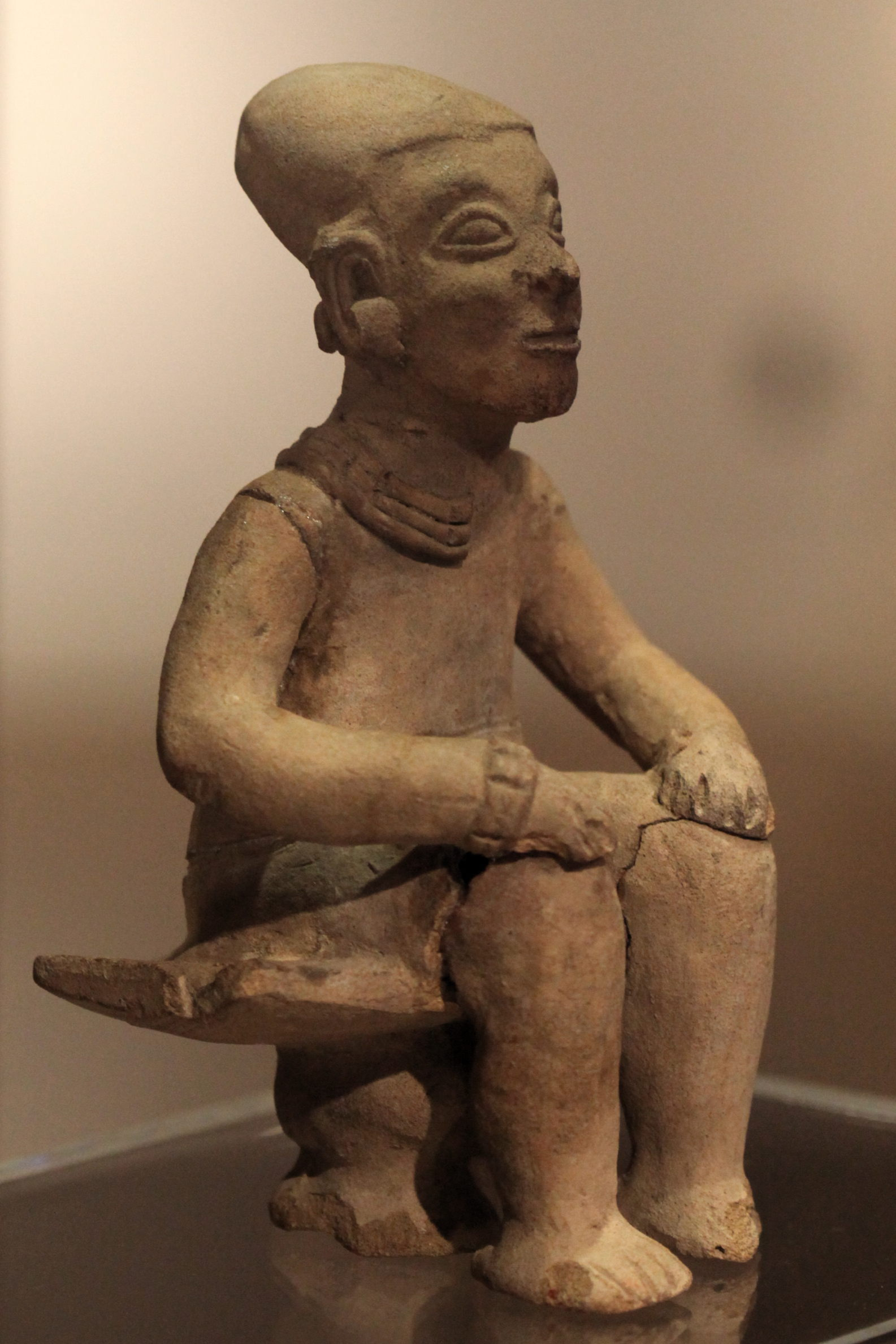
Seating man figure
