= Golden sun of La Tolita =

Ecuadorian archaeological artifact

Golden Sun of La Tolita
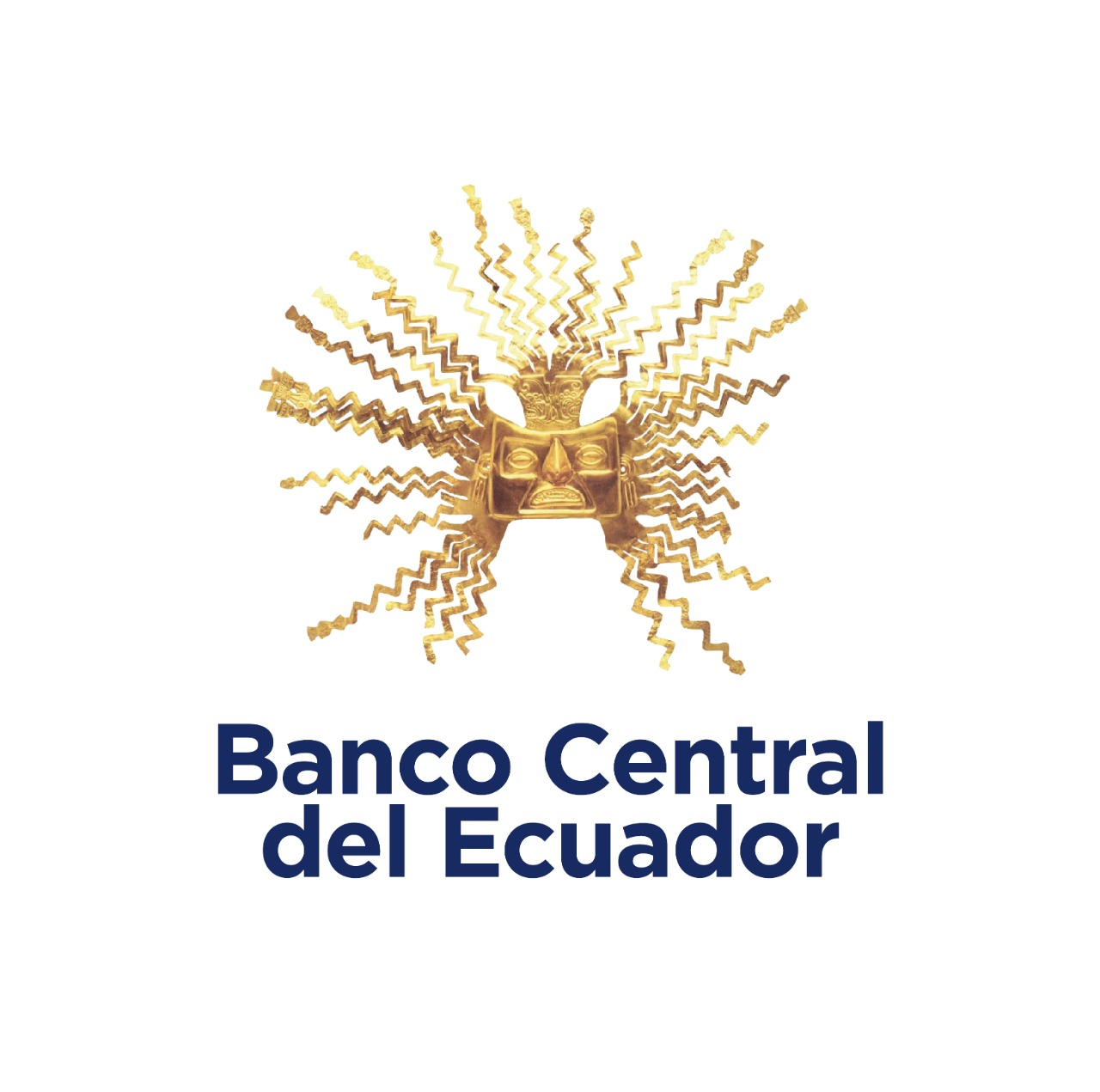
- The Golden Sun represented in the logo of the Central Bank of Ecuador
- Material: Gold
- Weight: 246 gr
- Discovered: 1939 or 1940
- Present location: Casa de la Cultura Ecuatoriana, Quito, Ecuador
- Culture: Tumaco-La Tolita

The Golden Sun of La Tolita, Golden Sun of the Central Bank of Ecuador, Golden Sun of Konanz, Golden Sun of Quito or simply Golden Sun, is an archaeological artifact in the form of a mask or a headdress that represents a personification of the Sun. The Central Bank of Ecuador adopted the artifact as its logo.

Usually, the Golden Sun is attributed to the archaeological culture of Tumaco-La Tolita that inhabited the northern Ecuadorian and southern Colombian coast. Despite this, there are doubts about the artifact's provenance. There is another very similar archaeological piece, known as the Golden Sun of Guayaquil or Golden Sun of Estrada, although there are doubts about its authenticity.

== History ==
The Golden Sun of La Tolita was acquired by collector Max Konanz in 1940, who bought it from Cornelio Vintimilla Muñoz, a merchant from the city of Cuenca, who in turn bought it from Ariolfo Vásquez Moreira. The information given by the seller indicates that the mask was found in 1939 or 1940 in a town called Chunucari, between the towns of Chordeleg and Sígsig in Ecuador's Azuay Province. This area is known for its well-furnished burials. Unfortunately, this information is not reliable, since the piece was found by looters, who tend to lie about the provenance of archaeological finds because of possible legal implications, or to maintain the secret location of sites containing valuable artifacts. Despite this, Konanz accepted the origin indicated by the seller.

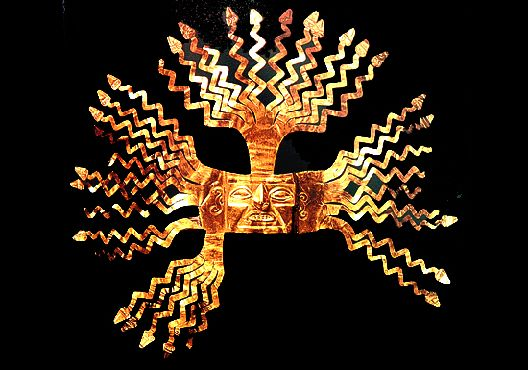
Golden sun of Estrada

The piece was folded into a ball when Konanz acquired it. It was probably folded by the looters who found it to facilitate its transport. The collector Vintimilla, along with his wife Dolores, unfolded the piece, causing several of the sun's rays to break.

The Casa de la Cultura Ecuatoriana ('House of Ecuadorian Culture') published a picture of the Golden Sun in a 1953 bulletin. Shortly after, in the mid-1950s, archaeologist Emilio Estrada acquired the second golden sun in Manabí Province. This new sun was suspected of being a fake because of some typological inconsistencies, and the closeness of its find to the publication date of the Golden Sun of La Tolita.

In 1960, the Central Bank of Ecuador bought Konanz's collection and adopted the Golden Sun as its logo. At that time, the origin indicated by Moreira was questioned. Through typological analysis, it was concluded that the origin of the piece must be the Tolita culture. In 1978, the bank also bought the Golden Sun of Estrada.

The change in the provenance of the piece from Chunucari to Tolita was the cause of many discussions; for this reason, the Central Bank carried out chemical studies of both golden suns in 2001 and 2002. The aim of these studies was to determine the place of origin of the gold with which the artifacts were made. They concluded that both suns came from the north coast of Ecuador, the place inhabited by the Tolita culture.

In 2018, a controversy broke out on social media because an allegation was made that the piece had been stolen. For this reason, new chemical analyses were carried out that confirmed its authenticity, since these studies yielded results very similar to those carried out between 2001 and 2002.

== Decoration ==
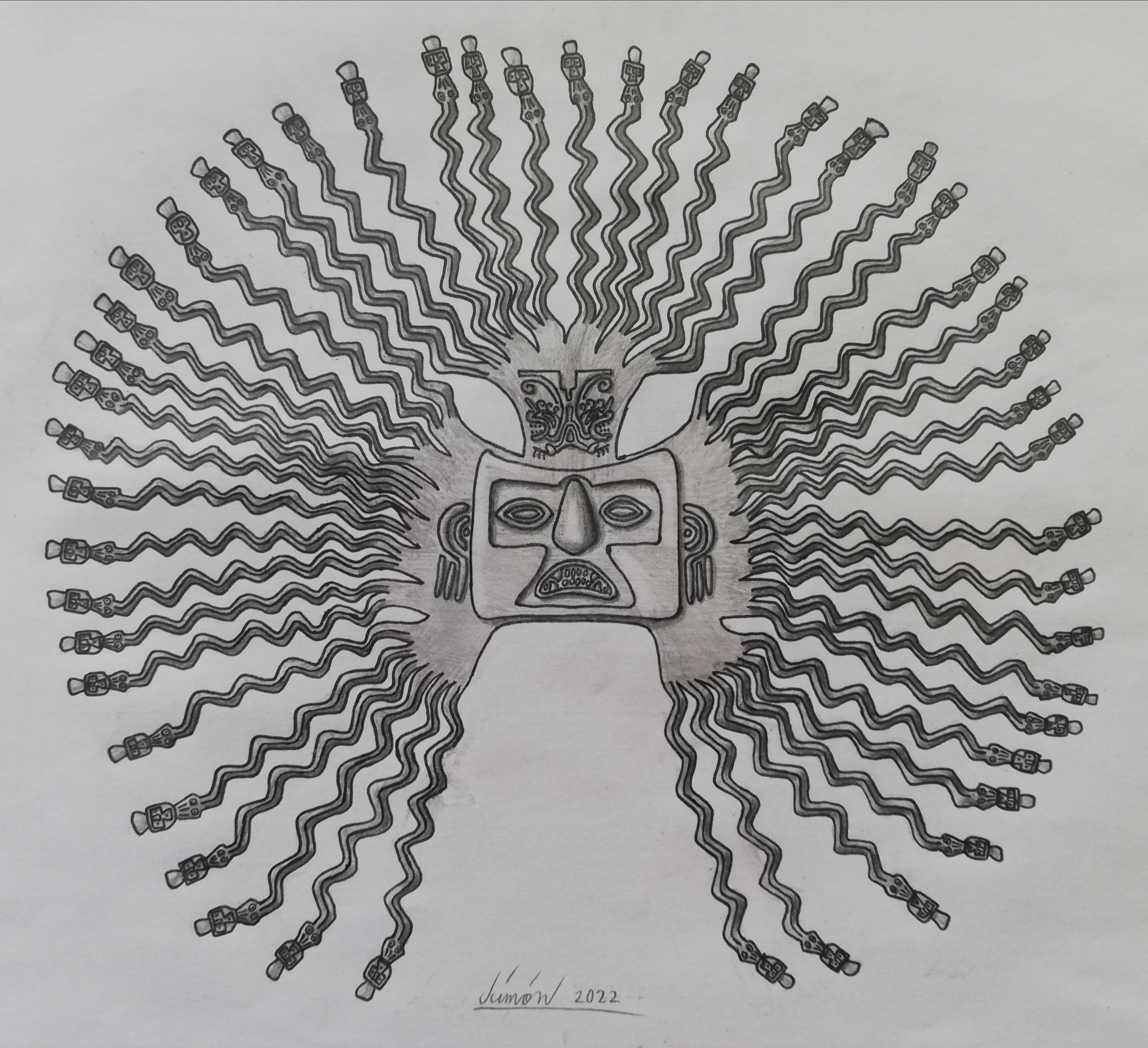
Golden Sun as it would have appeared before being damaged by looters

Both suns have a rectangular face from which zigzaging sun rays radiate. The rays are clustered into five groups. These go to the left, right, up, down and left, and down and right, but none go down from the centre. Throughout the entire piece there are relief decorations achieved using embossing.

=== Face ===
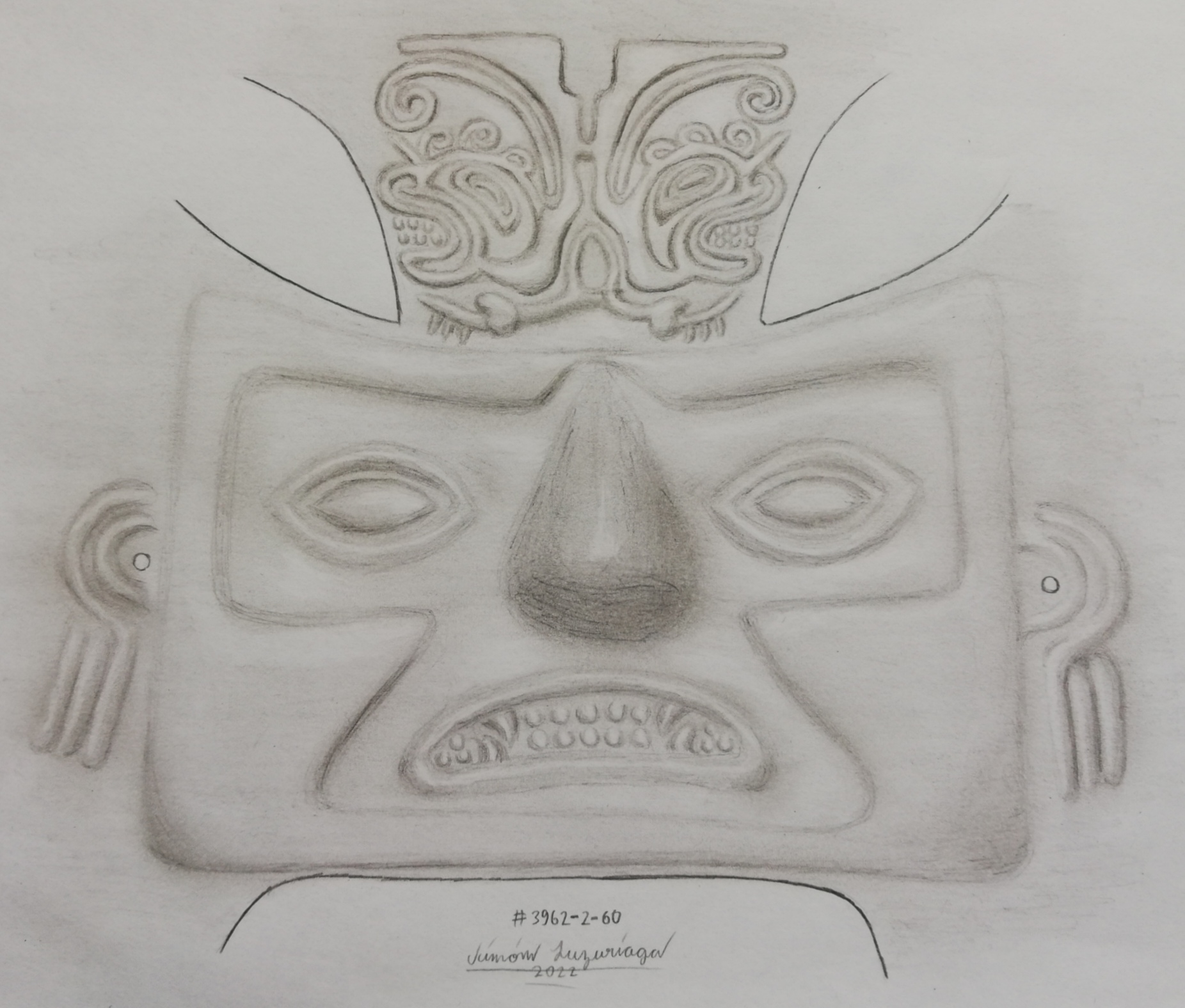
Detailed view of the face and crested animal of the Golden Sun of La Tolita

Both suns have a rectangular face, inside of which is a T-shaped section where the eyes, nose and mouth are located. The eyes and the nose have a similar shape on both suns, but the mouth is a little different. While both headdresses have a slightly downward-twisted mouth, the one on the La Tolita sun has four fangs that do not exist on the Estrada sun.

=== Ears ===
On the Golden sun of La Tolita, the ears are two concentric semicircles from which three lines are born that presumably represent earrings. There is a hole in the center of the semicircles that presumably would serve to attach it to its mounting.

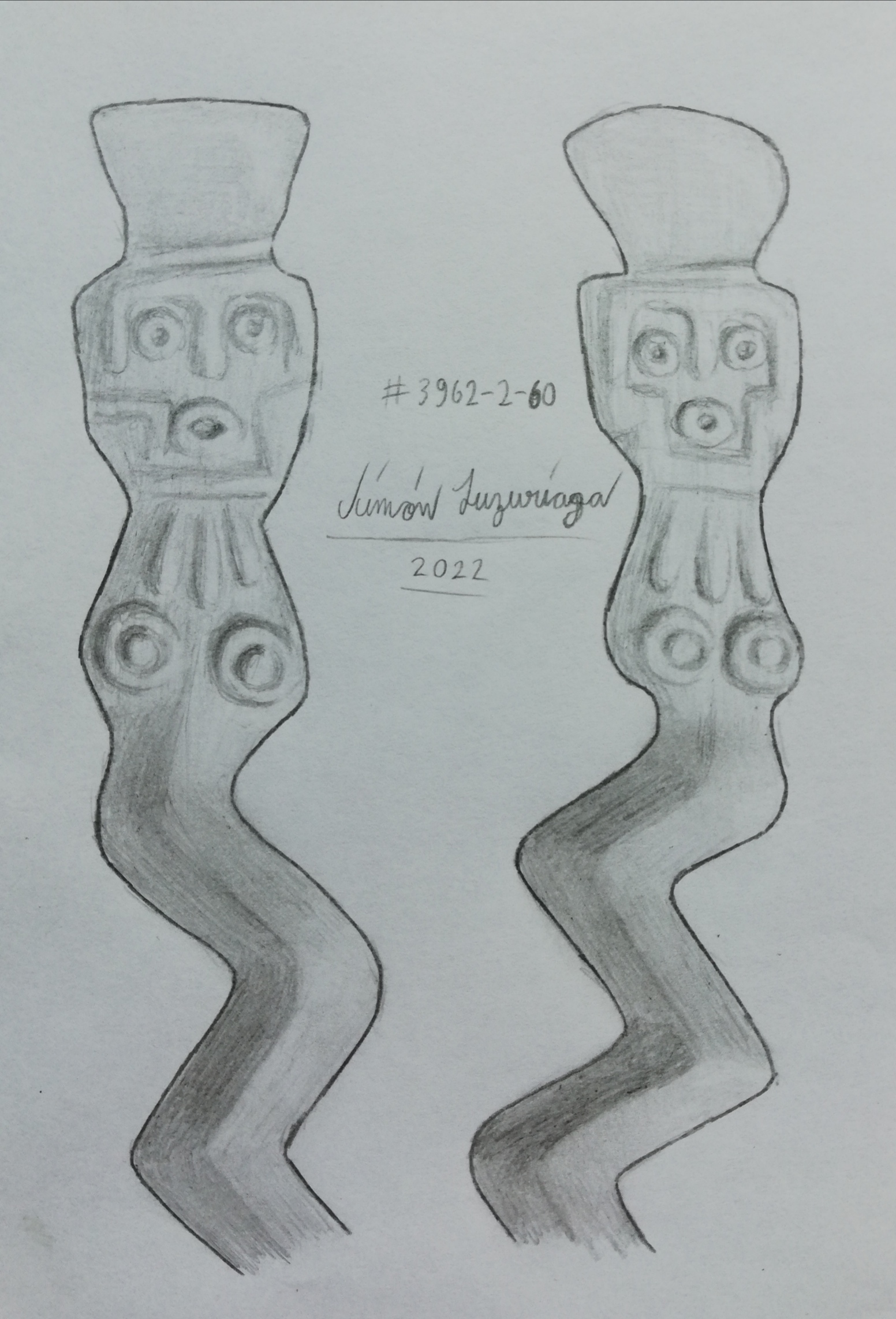
Detailed view of the sun rays of the Golden Sun of La Tolita

On the other hand, on the Golden Sun of Estrada, the ears consist of a double spiral placed backwards. The holes are between them and the face . Although this type of ears has been seen in other Andean cultures, they are usually looking to another direction. This typological inconsistency was pointed out by archaeologist Karen Olsen Bruhns to suggest the possibility that the piece is fake.

=== Crested animal ===
At the base of the upper cluster of rays is a two-headed crested animal. This exists exclusively on the Golden Sun of La Tolita, while on the Golden Sun of Estrada this area is empty. The animal is very similar to the Animal of the Moon of the Moche culture. The art historian Costanza Di Capua pointed out the existence of very similar figures in other pieces of La Tolita to argue that it was the origin of the golden sun.

=== Sun rays ===
The rays of both suns are in pairs. They are an example of what archaeologist John H. Rowe called kennings. These are an artistic element of South American prehistory that consists of turning the long and thin appendages of any piece into snakes.

The Golden Sun of La Tolita has 48 symmetrically located rays. Most of them are broken, and only 12 are complete. A raised line runs through the center of each ray. The serpent heads of the piece hold in their mouths another head called a Trophy Head, which has a face in the same T-shape as the central face. These heads have tall headdresses. Very similar heads can be seen in other pieces from the Tumaco-La Tolita culture, which supports the argument that it is the true origin of the headdress.

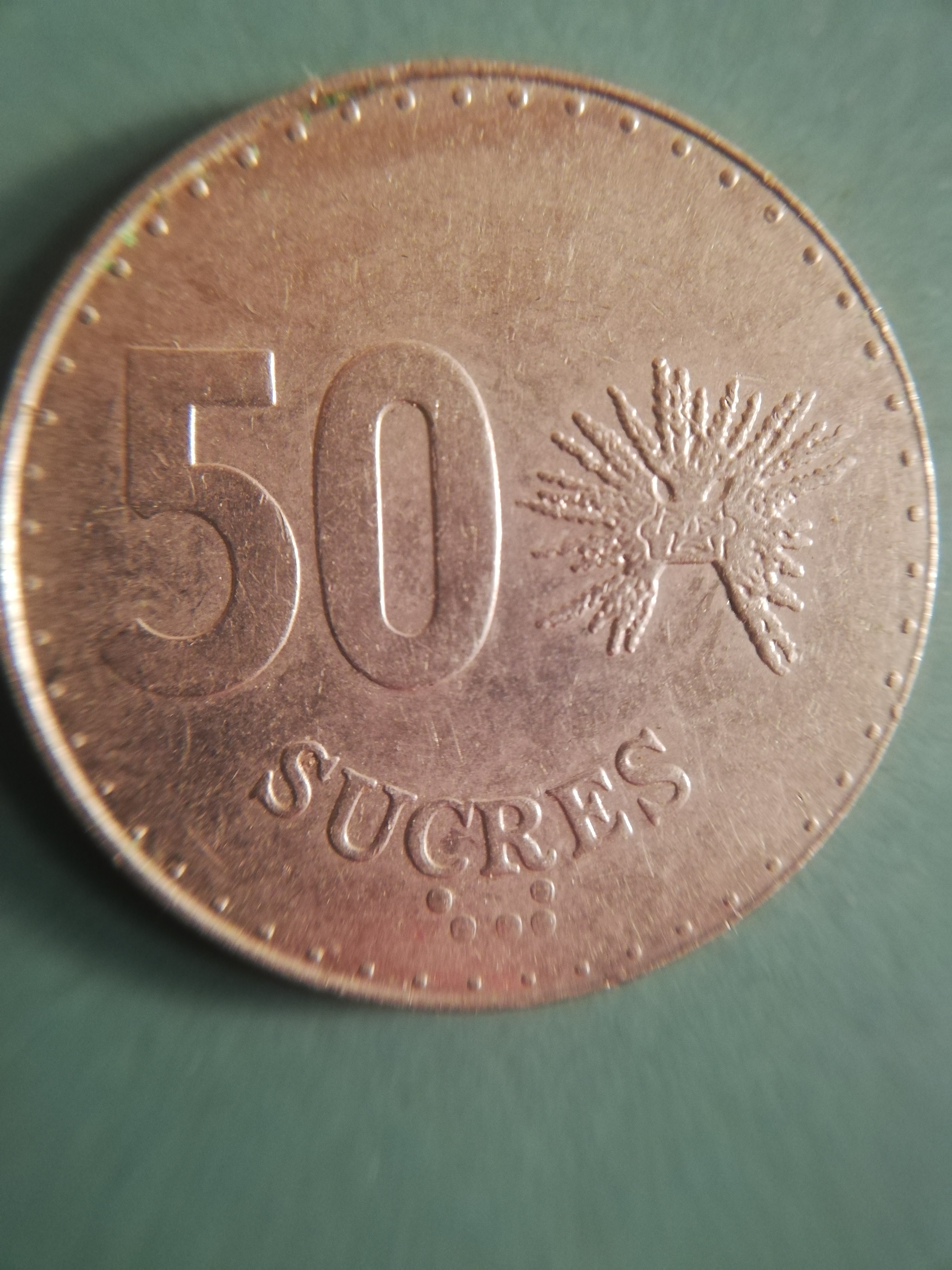
50 sucres coin from 1991 with a representation of the Golden Sun of La Tolita

== Chemical composition ==
In order to know whether the origin of the Golden Sun is the one indicated by Ariolfo Vásquez (Azuay Province) or if it comes from the Ecuadorian or Colombian coast, the Central Bank ordered physico-chemical analyses to be carried out on the two golden suns and several samples from pre-Columbian goldsmith pieces from Ecuador. It was concluded that the gold with which the pieces were made is more similar to the pieces from the Ecuadorian coast than to the pieces from Azuay, suggesting that the origin is the Tumaco-La Tolita culture.

In addition, it was found that both golden suns have a very similar chemical composition. This led to the hypothesis that they were made in the same workshop, which contradicts the supposed forgery of the Golden Sun of Estrada. However the chemical resemblance could be explained because local jewelers usually use gold of archaeological origin, so it cannot be affirmed that the Estrada sun is original.

A second chemical composition study was carried out in 2018 in order to verify the authenticity of the Tolita sun due to rumors that it had been stolen. These studies were able to demonstrate that the piece is authentic in addition to showing that its composition is not homogeneous.

Chemical composition of the golden suns (2004)
| Sample | Gold | Silver | Copper | Platinum | Palladium | Arsenic | Titanium | Ruthenium | Tin | Antimony | Tellurium | Lead |
|---|---|---|---|---|---|---|---|---|---|---|---|---|
| Golden Sun of La Tolita | 79.8% | 9.7% | 9.5% | 0.930 ppm | 95.0 ppm | 8.0 ppm | 1.0 ppm | 45.0 ppm | 4.0 ppm | 2.0 ppm | 3.0 ppm | 30.0 ppm |
| Golden Sun of Estrada | 81.8% | 11.4% | 5.5% | 1.170 ppm | 63.0 ppm | 8.0 ppm | 1.0 ppm | 63.0 ppm | 1.0 ppm | 4.0 ppm | 2.0 ppm | 3.0 ppm |

Chemical composition of the golden sun (2018)
| | Gold | Copper | Silver | Platinum | Palladium |
|---|---|---|---|---|---|
| Average percentage | 83.39% | 10.68% | 2.99% | 1.81% | 0% |

== Manufacture ==
The manufacturing process for the Golden Sun would have required heating the gold up to 990 °C (1,810 °F) in a furnace and then pouring it into a mold. After which the piece would have been continuously hammered and reheated until a fine sheet of gold was obtained. The nose was achieved using the deep drawing technique, while the other face decorations were achieved by embossing. After making the face, they would have continued to cut parts of the sheet to form the rays, and any deformations caused by the cutting process would have been corrected by hammering.
