= Central Bank of Ecuador =

Government-owned institution

Central Bank of Ecuador Banco Central del Ecuador (Spanish)
- Central bank of: Ecuador
- Headquarters: Quito
- Established: August 10, 1927; 98 years ago
- Ownership: 100% state ownership
- Key people: Guillermo Avellán Solines
- Currency: None^{1}
- Reserves: 8,458.7 million USD (December 2022)
- Website: www.bce.fin.ec
- ^{1}Previously Ecuadorian sucre (ECS) until March 2000.

The Central Bank of Ecuador (Spanish: Banco Central del Ecuador; BCE) is the central bank of the country, and an institution of the Executive Function, which has institutional, administrative, financial, and technical autonomy. It is in charge of executing the monetary policy established by the Monetary Policy and Regulation Board of Ecuador, which has been the institution's highest governing body since October 2021.

Between 1927 and 2000, the Central Bank was in charge of issuing sucre coins and banknotes, but this function ceased after the adoption of the US dollar as the country's legal currency on January 9, 2000.

Since 2000, the Central Bank's objectives are to strengthen dollarization and guarantee technical autonomy. The BCE is the administrator of the country's international reserves, which contribute to economic stability. It promotes the use of monetary payment methods and fosters monetary education. Additionally the BCE generates macroeconomic statistics and guarantees the availability of banknotes and coins in the country.

== Logo ==
On February 4, 1976, the Central Bank adopted the Golden Sun of the La Tolita culture from the northern coastal region of Ecuador as its logo. The Golden Sun is a mask with a headdress that represents a mixture between a star and an animal. It has 48 rays in the form of serpents.

== History ==
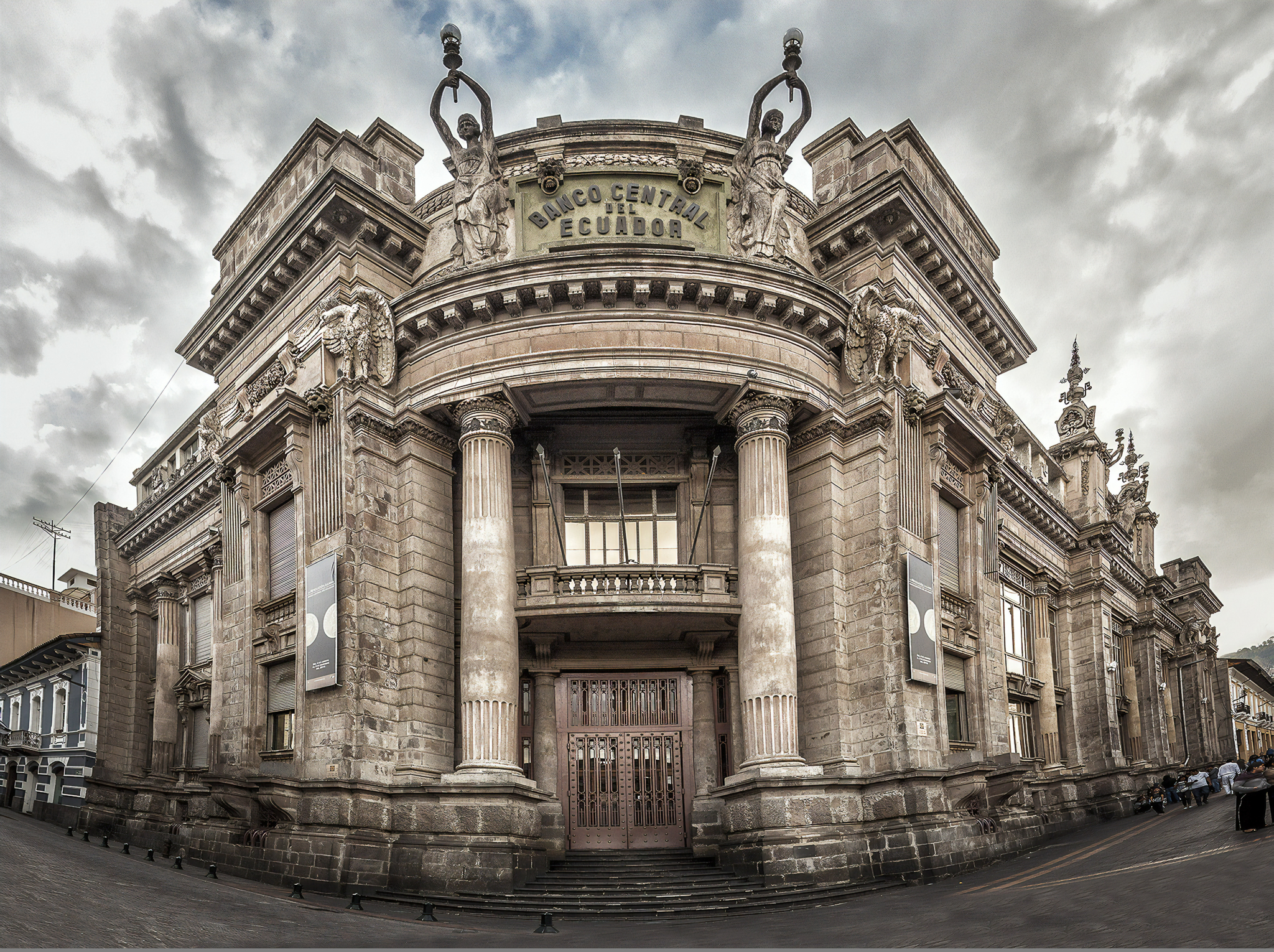
First building of the Central Bank of Ecuador, current Numismatic Museum

=== Background ===
In the first three decades of the twentieth century, the Ecuadorian economic and financial system was characterized by constant macroeconomic, financial and monetary problems, such as the lack of control of monetary issuance and private banking activities.

The situation was aggravated even more by the international context of World War I and the inflationary and deflationary problems that led to the Great Depression of 1929.

Additionally, in the first five years of the 1920s international demand for cacao, Ecuador's main export at the time, declined significantly. This was accompanied by pest problems with the crop, leading to economic crisis and political instability.

=== Foundation ===
The economic and political crisis led to the revolt of young army officers on July 9, 1925, known as the July Revolution, which occurred in the midst of growing social discontent.

Luis Napoleon Dillon, Minister of Finance at the time and one of the main figures of the revolution, is considered the first to promote the creation of an Ecuadorian central bank. His objective was to establish an institution or organization for issuing currency, making financial transfers, and depositing and discounting for the state.

Dillon's proposal did not succeed, although the "Law of the Ecuadorian Central Bank" was approved on October 9, 1925. On January 10 of the following year the bank's first board of directors resigned, including Dillon.

In spite of this, the idea matured through the leadership of President Isidro Ayora, one of the main promoters of the July Revolution. Under his administration, on June 26, 1926, the Central Issuance and Amortization Fund (Caja Central de Emisión y Amortización) was created, an entity in charge of officially recognizing the total number of means of payment and provisionally authorizing the circulation of banknotes. On October 18 of that year, Ayora ordered authorized banks to issue currency to deliver to the Central Fund certain amounts of gold and silver, which in total represented 10,600,000 sucres. Due to the critical situation of the economy, the bank's provisional board invited Edwin Kemmerer, a researcher, economist, and finance professor at Princeton University, to advise on the adoption of an extensive set of modernizing economic measures, among them the creation of a central bank.

On February 11, 1927, a commission led by Kemmerer presented the Central Bank Organic Law to the government for their consideration, and advised that the institution should be given a 50-year authorization to issue money, apply fixed-rate rediscounting, become a depository for the government and associated banks, manage the foreign exchange market and act as the government's fiscal agent.

The creation of the central bank was in response to the need for reforms to strengthen and organize the country's financial and monetary system, considering the difficulties of the time such as unsupported issuance of currency, price increases, speculation, and credit and payment imbalances.

The bill was approved by Ayora on March 4, 1927, and published in Official Register No. 283 on March 12. The preparation of the new central bank operation was in charge of an Organizing Commission appointed by Ayora. On June 3, the statutes were approved, after overcoming several operational difficulties between the Central Fund and the new institution. On June 4 the first board of directors was formed, led by Neptalí Bonifaz as president.

Finally, on August 10, 1927, the central bank opened in the building of the Compañía de Crédito Agrícola e Industrial, on the corner of García Moreno and Bolívar streets, in the Historic Center of Quito. On August 25, the BCE's main branch was inaugurated in the city of Guayaquil. Later, on November 23, the bank moved to a new building acquired from Banco Pichincha, located at the intersection of Garcia Moreno and Sucre streets, where it remained until 1968. Currently, this building is the Numismatic Museum of the Central Bank of Ecuador. On June 7, 1928, the bank began operations in Cuenca.

Since 1968, the bank's Quito headquarters has been located at the corner of Avenida 10 de Agosto and Briceño. In Guayaquil, it is located in the Edificio Ex Suizo, and in Cuenca, at Calle Larga and Huayna Cápac.

=== Early years ===
Stabilizing and unifying the currency were the bank's initial objectives. To achieve these, the bank established a gold standard which fixed the price of the sucre in terms of gold. The bank was obligated to keep the price fixed at 0.300933 grams of fine gold per sucre, equal to one fifth of the U.S. dollar's gold value at the time. This convertibility corresponded with the world economic crisis and the Great Depression.

From then on, the traditional policy of deficit spending and credit to the national government from the bank resumed, as it was between 1915 and 1925.

=== Internal reforms ===
Price instability driven by fiscal spending and expansionary monetary policy led another consultant, Mexican politician and monetary policy figure Manuel Gómez Morín, to reform the Central Bank Law and related monetary regulations. On December 30, 1937, a new Organic Law of the Central Bank of Ecuador came into effect, and the bank's highest governing body became the board of directors.

In Gómez Morín's view, the monetary authority should channel credit to the economic sectors considered critical to development. Together with Guayaquil banker Víctor Emilio Estrada, he advised assigning the central bank a central role in determining the types of loans offered by private banks to productive sectors by modifying the discount rate. Nevertheless, there were numerous difficulties in implementing the recommendations given by the Gómez Morín Commission.

=== Third reform and Monetary Board ===
After the end of World War II, a new upturn in inflation, together with serious balance of payments problems, again made it necessary to call in foreign experts. The then-manager of the Central Bank of Ecuador, Guillermo Pérez Chiriboga, called Robert Triffin, an expert from the Federal Reserve System of the United States. The Harvard University consultant proposed replacing the Organic Law of the Central Bank with the Monetary Regime Law and the International Exchange Law, which came into effect on March 12, 1948.

Under the new law, the bank's highest governing body became the Monetary Board, in which the Government also participated, as a sign of its co-responsibility in the design of monetary policy. The Board also had the power to devalue the currency and execute counter-cyclical policies. In addition, the Central Bank was authorized to grant loans to the State and the productive sector, as well as to promote an accounting system that allowed it to assume the new functions. The ultimate goal of the entity was to achieve price stability and the preservation of a solvent financial situation.

=== Impact of the Latin American debt crisis ===
For more than three decades, this monetary regime successfully faced multiple shocks. However, the severity of the Latin American external debt crisis of the 1980s and 1990s led the country to reorganize its public finances. On May 7, 1992, the Monetary Regime and State Bank Law was approved, enabling the BCE to intervene in the financial system through open market operations. In addition, the Monetary Board was replaced by a Board of Directors of the BCE led by an assigned president, differentiating the path between government influence and BCE autonomy.

Subsequently, in the 1998 Constitution, the BCE's technical autonomy was enshrined, which gave it a leading role in the management of the 1999 banking crisis, that ended with the sucre as the national currency and the implementation of dollarization, which led to changes in the main functions of the BCE once it ceased to issue the sucre.

A decade later, in the 2008 Constitution, the BCE's autonomy was eliminated, turning it into an institution dependent on the central government. During this period, the bank made loans to the Executive.

The BCE recovered its technical autonomy on April 22, 2021, with the approval of the Organic Reformatory Law to the Organic Monetary and Financial Code for the Defense of the Dollarization, reforms that were approved by the National Assembly on April 22, 2021, and published in the Supplement to the Official Registry No. 443 of May 3 of that year.

Among the first actions taken by the institution under the new legal framework was the agreement reached between the BCE and the Ministry of Economy and Finance (MEF), signed on June 30, 2021, whereby the BCE would return to the MEF the shares it held in public banks (Corporación Financiera Nacional (CFN), BanEcuador and Corporación Nacional de Finanzas Populares (Conafips)). Those shares were received on May 18, 2017, as dation in payment for the resources delivered at the time to the Government in office. The MEF has agreed to deliver US$2.378 million to the BCE by 2035.

== Leadership ==
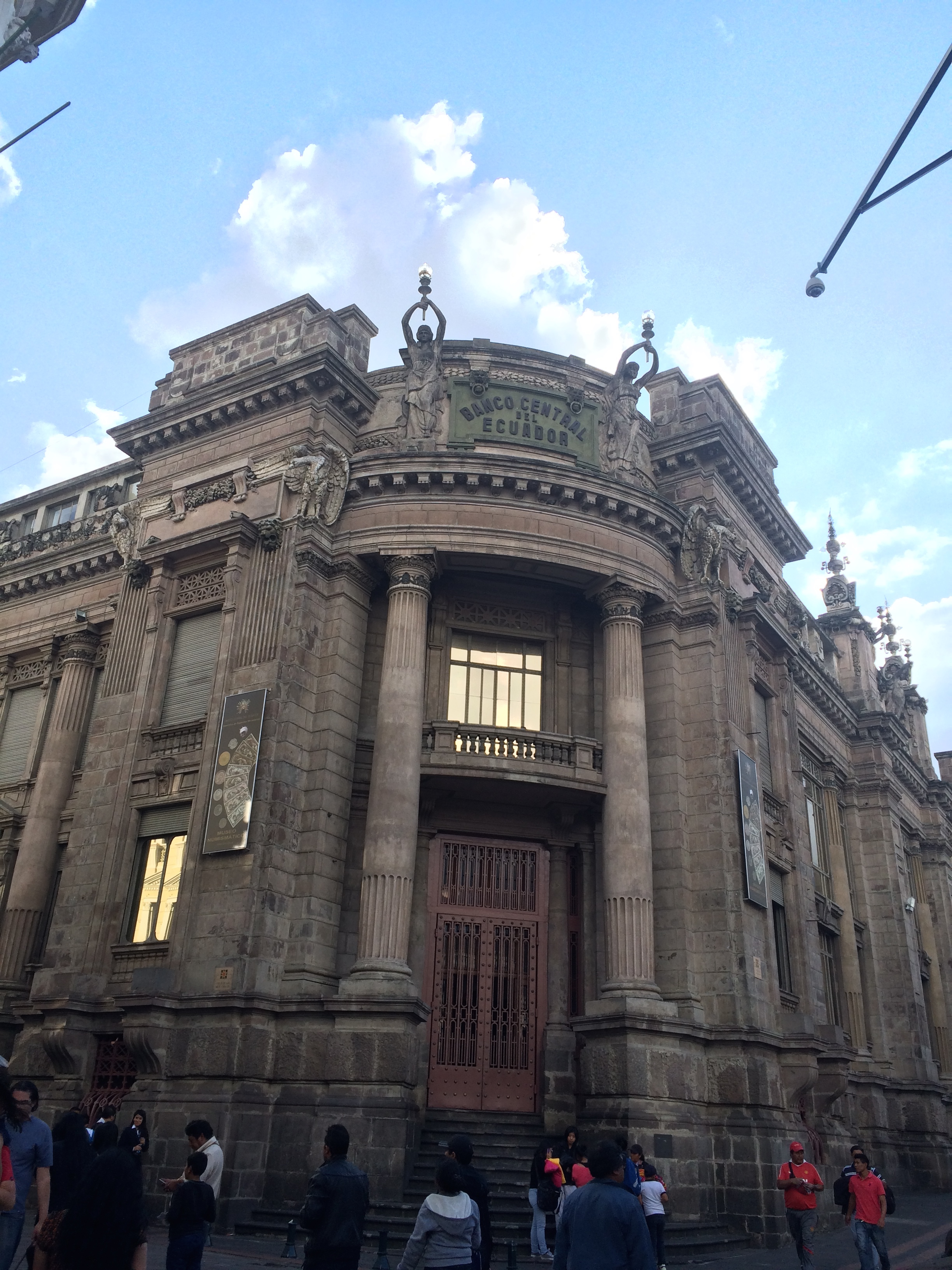
Central Bank of Ecuador in Quito

As established by the current Organic Monetary and Financial Code, the highest governing body of the BCE is the Monetary Policy and Regulation Board, which is responsible of formulating monetary policy and observing its implementation by the BCE, in order to preserve the integrity and sustainability of the monetary system of dollarization and the Ecuadorian financial system.

The members of this new body were elected and sworn in by the National Assembly on October 12, 2021. The current members of the Monetary Policy and Regulation Board are: Tatiana Rodríguez Cerón, Paulina Garzón Alvear and Wilson Pérez Oviedo.

=== Presidents and general managers ===
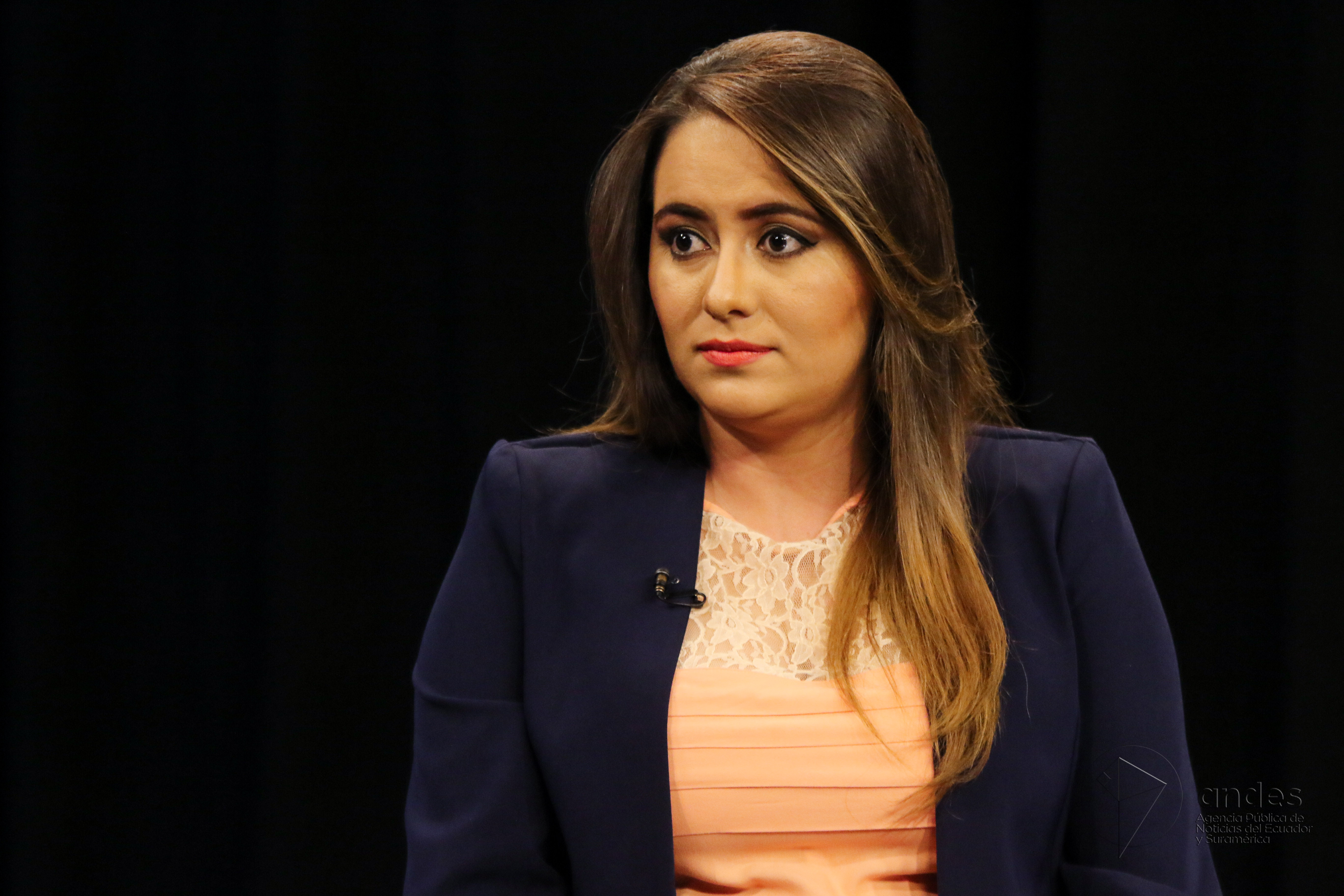
Verónica Artola, the bank's general manager from 2017 to 2021

- Luis Napoleón Dillon, 1927
- Neptalí Bonifaz, 1927–1929
- Enrique Cuerva, 1929–1932
- Temistocles Terán, 1932
- Alberto Bustamante, 1932–1933
- Alberto Larrea Chiriboga, 1933–1936
- Luis Calisto Mestanza, 1936
- Fidel A. López Arteta, 1936–1937
- Alberto Wither Navarro, 1937
- Heliodoro Sáenz, 1937–1938
- Augusto Bueno Mancheno, 1938
- Alberto Ordeñana Cortéz, 1938–1939
- Alejandro Ponce Borja, 1939–1940
- Alberto Alcívar Destrouge, 1940–1944
- José María Falconi, 1944
- Guillermo Pérez Chiriboga, 1944–1960
- Nicolas Fuentes Avellán, 1960–1963
- Guillermo Pérez Chiriboga, 1963–1966
- Jorge Pareja Martínez, 1967–1969
- Joaquín Zevallos Menéndez, 1969–1972
- Federico Intriago Arrata, 1972
- Eduardo Larrea Stacey, 1972–1973
- Germaníco Espinoza Zambrano, 1973–1976
- Danilo Carrera Drouet, 1976
- Rodrigo Espinosa Bermeo, 1976–1979
- Germánico Salgado, 1979
- Mauricio Dávalos Guevara, 1979–1981
- Abelardo Pachano, 1981–1984
- Carlos Julio Emanuel Morán, 1984–1987
- Fernando Herrero Sevilla, 1987–1988
- José Morillo Batlle, 1988–1990
- Eduardo Valencia, 1990–1991
- Eduardo Samaniego, 1991–1992
- Ana Lucía Armijos, 1992–1993
- Augusto de la Torre, 1993–1997
- Fidel Jaramillo, 1997–1998
- Luis Jácome Hidalgo, 1998–1999
- Modesto Correa, 1999–2000
- José Luis Ycaza, 2000–2001
- Mauricio Yépez, 2001–2004
- Mauricio Pareja, 2004
- José Cucalón, 2004–2005
- José Jouvin Vernaza, 2005–2006
- Eduardo Cabezas Molina, 2006–2008
- Robert Andrade, 2008
- Carlos Vallejo López, 2008–2009
- Diego Borja, 2009–2011
- Pedro Delgado Campaña, 2011–2012
- Jeannette Sanchez, 2012–2013
- Diego Martínez Vinueza, 2013, last president of the bank
- Mateo Villalba, 2013–2015
- Diego Martínez Vinueza, 2015–2016
- Madeleine Abarca, 2016–2017
- Verónica Artola, 2017–2021
- Guillermo Avellán Solines, 2021–

== Mission and vision ==
Once Ecuador adopted the dollarization system on January 9, 2000, which implied that it stopped issuing a national currency, the functions of the BCE were modified by the Organic Statute issued through Executive Decree No. 1589 of June 13, 2001.

After the latest modifications introduced by the Reformatory Organic Law to the Organic Monetary and Financial Code of May 2021, and the reforms to the Organic Statute of Organizational Management by Processes of the BCE issued by the former Monetary and Financial Policy and Regulation Board on September 8, 2021, the mission and vision of the BCE are:

Mission: To guarantee monetary stability, dollarization, the provision of safe and efficient means of payment, and the generation of macroeconomic studies and statistics to contribute to the welfare of society and the economic and financial stability of the country.

Vision: To be an institution of high technical capacity, a reference in digital transformation and recognized for its integrity, transparency, and service vocation.

== Functions ==
The main functions assigned to the BCE in Article 36 of the Organic Monetary and Financial Code as amended in 2021 by means of the Organic Reformatory Law to the Organic Monetary and Financial Code for the Defense of Dollarization are:

- Implementing monetary policy, through interest rate targeting and the establishment of the required banking reserve, to sustain the monetary and financial system.
- Acting as the country's fiscal and financial agent. Public institutions must deposit their resources in the BCE in order to execute their payment orders.
- Managing and preserving the country's international reserves, which comprise cash, monetary gold and deposits from the public and private sectors, in order to guarantee the payment of goods and services.
- Facilitating the availability of banknotes and coins in the necessary quantity, quality and denominations, to guarantee the availability of cash on a national scale.
- Managing the central payment system, where transactions made by citizens are channeled, and promoting modern and efficient payment methods that promote financial inclusion.
- Through its Centralized Securities Depository (Depositario Centralizado de Valores; DCV) it has custody, clears and settles securities traded in the Ecuadorian stock market.
- Preparing, analyzing and publishing macroeconomic studies and statistics in a technical and transparent manner to facilitate decision making, as well as contracting external loans for the financing of the external sector.
- Acquiring non-monetary gold from domestic small scale mining.
- Acting as trustee of the Liquidity Fund Trusts of the private and popular and solidarity financial systems.

== Services ==
- Exchange of all denominations of United States dollar banknotes and coins through customer service counters and coin dispensing machines.
- Provision of dollars on a national scale, ensuring economic activities as a whole, in coordination with the United States Federal Reserve for the import of banknotes.
- Administration of the Interbank Payment System (SPI), through which electronic funds transfers are made between clients of different financial institutions, ensuring the provision of safe and efficient payment mechanisms.
- Purchase of non-monetary gold from small scale miners, through offices in Quito and Machala.
- Administration and preparation of the registry of Auxiliary Payment Systems, which are entities authorized by the BCE to transfer monetary resources such as public funds and remittances, and for transactional switches for payment services.
- Generation and publication of macroeconomic statistics on a regular basis, as well as specialized economic studies.
- Online issuance and renewal of electronic signature certificates used by individuals and companies on invoices and electronic documents.
- Clearing and settlement of securities traded by individuals and companies, such as shares, bonds, certificates of deposit, and commercial invoices, through the Centralized Securities Depository. This depository guards securities and generates a return for their holders.
- Preservation of the history of the economy and means of payment in Ecuador, detailed at the Numismatic Museum in Quito and Cuenca. Its collection includes coins, bills, commercial documents such as shares and bonds, stamps, and medals.
- The BCE's Economic Library makes available to citizens more than 26,000 books and more than 1,000 serial titles (such as magazines, newsletters, and yearbooks), in addition to a digital book catalog and access to specialized databases, such as Scopus, Jove, Ebsco, Elsevier, Oxford Academic, and Scientific American.

== Certifications ==
One of the main goals of the BCE is fighting corruption by promoting transparency in institutional management. For this reason, in November 2020, the BCE obtained ISO 37001 certification for the implementation of an anti-bribery management system (ABMS), for the purpose of prohibiting, preventing, detecting, and punishing acts of bribery.

The ABMS operates through three BCE departments:

- The Division of Processes, Quality, and Innovation, which oversees internal and external audits;
- The Division of Operational Risks, which evaluates the likelihood of bribery; and
- The Division of Compliance, which receives and manages complaints.

ISO 37001 certification strengthens organizational culture and enables process-based management for continuous improvement, elaboration of procedures, mitigation, and contingency plans. This system takes into consideration the risks faced by the BCE due to its size and complexity. The bank renewed its ISO certification in 2022.

== Structure ==
The highest governing body of the BCE is the Monetary Policy and Regulation Board.

The BCE has a General Management Office, a General Deputy Management Office, a Deputy Programming and Regulation Office, a Deputy Operations Office and a Deputy Services Office. Each deputy office is composed of several directorates.

Additionally, there are four general coordinating bodies: Strategic Planning and Management, Legal, Information and Communication Technologies, and Financial Administration. Each coordinating body has different directorates to fulfill its functions.

Finally, there are two zonal directorates, in the cities of Guayaquil and Cuenca, and also an office in the city of Machala for the purchase of non-monetary gold from small-scale mining.

== International reserves ==
International reserves are the economic resources available to the country to support payments abroad that must be made by the state, companies, or individuals through financial institutions. These reserves are managed by the BCE according to the investment policy approved by the Monetary Policy and Regulation Board, and under the principles of security, liquidity, diversification and profitability.

International reserves are mainly composed of oil and non-oil exports, deposits of coins and bills made by banks in the BCE's vaults, and disbursements received by the country from multilateral organizations.

Ecuador's international exchange reserves reached their historically highest point in March 2022, when they were at US$9,226.3 million. This level of international reserves has allowed the BCE to cover all its public and private deposits with liquid assets for the first time.

== See also ==
- Ministry of Economy and Finance (Ecuador)
- Economy of Ecuador
- Banking in Ecuador
- List of central banks
