= External sector =

Part of a national economy

The external sector is the portion of a country's economy that interacts with the economies of other countries. In the goods market, the external sector involves exports and imports. In the financial market it involves capital flows.

== See also ==
- Balance of payments
- Current account (balance of payments)
- Capital account
- Foreign direct investment
- External debt
- Exchange rate
- Foreign exchange reserves
- Net international investment position
