= Alcarraza =

Porous earthenware container

An alcarraza (/ˌælkəˈrɑːzə/, Spanish: [alkaˈraθa]) is an earthenware container, traditionally made in Spain. The container is filled with a liquid, then hung in a drafty place in the shade. The liquid seeps through the earthenware slowly and is evaporated by the action of the draft, lowering the temperature of the container and keeping the rest of the liquid cool.

The source word for this container name – which exists in this form in Spanish, Galician and Portuguese – is the Arabic الكراز al-kurrāz.

== See also ==
- Botijo
- Double spout and bridge vessel
