= List of people named in the Panama Papers =

People named in 2016 document leak scandal

Countries with politicians, public officials or close associates implicated in the leak on April 15, 2016 (as of May 18, 2016)

This is a partial list of people named in the Panama Papers as shareholders, directors and beneficiaries of offshore companies. The International Consortium of Investigative Journalists (ICIJ) released the full list of companies and individuals in the Panama Papers on 10 May 2016. ICIJ published the following disclaimer with regard to the data provided: "There are legitimate uses for offshore companies, foundations and trusts. We do not intend to suggest or imply that any persons, companies or other entities included in the ICIJ Power Players interactive application have broken the law or otherwise acted improperly." The disclosures "implicated at least 140 politicians from more than 50 countries" in tax evasion schemes.

== Government officials ==
Current or former heads of state or government of their country as defined by their political position at the time of announcement, not whether the documents in the Papers relating to them coincided with their period of office.

=== Heads of state ===
- Salman, King of Saudi Arabia

==== Former heads of state ====
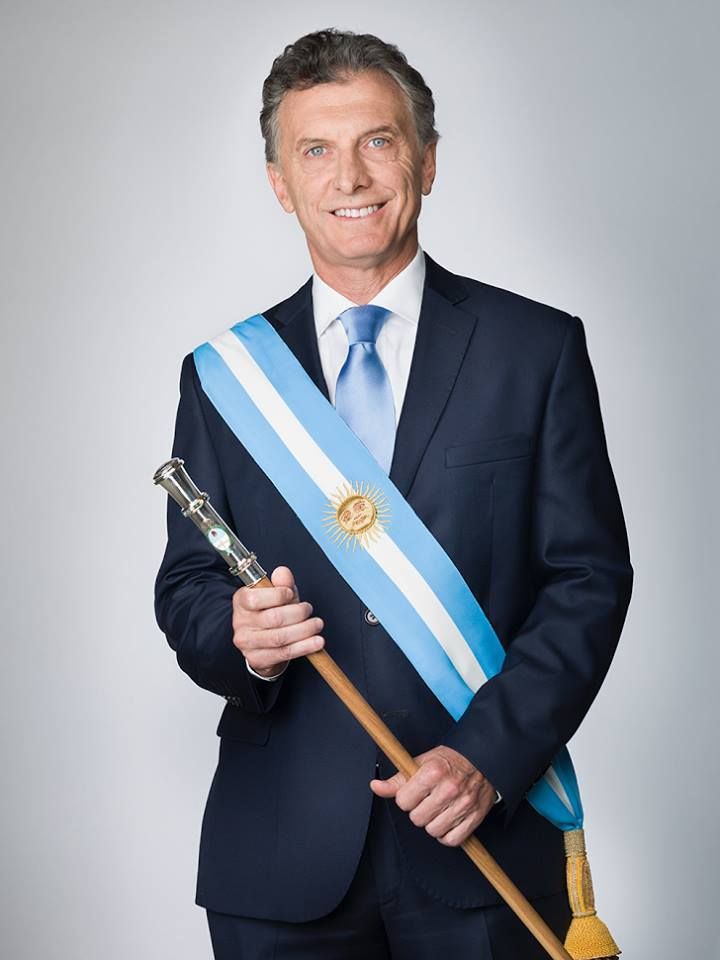
Former Argentine President Mauricio Macri

- Mauricio Macri, former President of Argentina
- Petro Poroshenko, former President of Ukraine
- Khalifa bin Zayed Al Nahyan (d. 2022), former President of the United Arab Emirates and Emir of Abu Dhabi
- Hamad bin Khalifa Al Thani, former Emir of Qatar, is listed as owner of Afrodille S.A., which had a bank account in Luxembourg and shares in two South African companies. Al Thani also held a majority of the shares in Rienne S.A. and Yalis S.A., holding a term deposit with the Bank of China in Luxembourg. A relative owned 25% of these: Sheikh Hamad bin Jassim Al Thani, Qatar's former prime minister and foreign minister.
- Ahmed al-Mirghani (d. 2008), former President of Sudan (1986–1989).

=== Heads of government ===
- Shahbaz Sharif, Prime Minister of Pakistan

==== Former heads of government ====
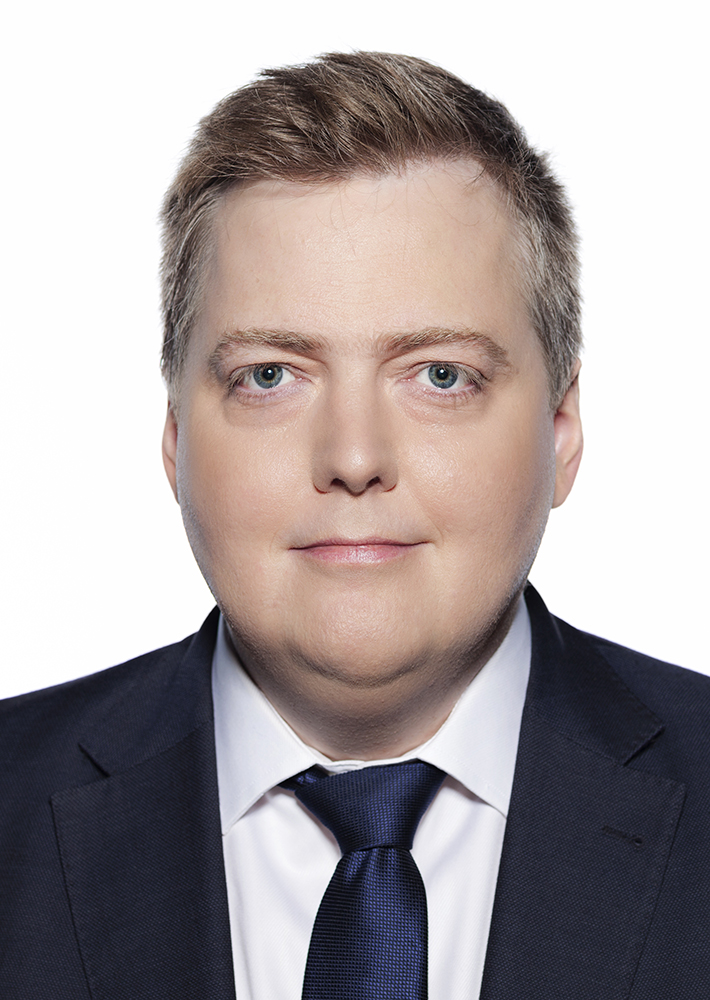
Icelandic Prime Minister Sigmundur Davíð Gunnlaugsson left office in April 2016 following the Panama Papers revelations.

- Malcolm Turnbull, former Prime Minister of Australia
- Sigmundur Davíð Gunnlaugsson, former Prime Minister of Iceland, left office in April 2016 as a result of the Panama Papers revelations
- Bjarni Benediktsson, former Prime Minister of Iceland
- Silvio Berlusconi (d. 2023), former Prime Minister of Italy
- (Georgia (country)) Bidzina Ivanishvili, former Prime Minister of Georgia
- Pavlo Lazarenko, former Prime Minister of Ukraine
- Ion Sturza, former Prime Minister of Moldova
- Ayad Allawi, former Acting Prime Minister of Iraq
- Ali Abu al-Ragheb (d. 2026), former Prime Minister of Jordan
- Benazir Bhutto (d. 2007), former Prime Minister of Pakistan and a member of the Bhutto family
- Nawaz Sharif, former Prime Minister of Pakistan
- Asif Ali Zardari, former Prime Minister of Pakistan
- Hamad bin Jassim bin Jaber Al Thani, former Prime Minister of Qatar

== Other government officials ==
Algeria

- Abdeslam Bouchouareb, former Minister of Industry and Mines

Andorra

- Jordi Cinca, former Minister of Finance

Angola

- José Maria Botelho de Vasconcelos, former Minister of Petroleum

Argentina

- Néstor Grindetti, Mayor of Lanús
- Jorge Macri, Mayor of Vicente López, Buenos Aires and cousin of Mauricio Macri
- Esteban Bullrich, former Minister of Education
- Carmen Polledo, 1st Vice President of the Legislature of the City of Buenos Aires for PRO
- Darío Loperfido, former Minister of Culture of Buenos Aires
- Gustavo Arribas, former Head of the Federal Intelligence Agency
- Waldo Wolff, fomer deputy at the Chamber of Deputies

Australia

- Neville Wran (d. 2014), former Premier of New South Wales

Botswana

- Ian Kirby, former President of the Botswana Court of Appeal and former attorney general

Brazil

- Joaquim Barbosa, former president of the Supreme Federal Court
- Newton Cardoso Jr, federal deputy for Minas Gerais
- Eduardo Cunha, former president of the Chamber of Deputies and former federal deputy for Rio de Janeiro
- Edison Lobão, former Governor of Maranhão, former senator for Maranhão, former Minister of Mines and Energy and former federal deputy for Maranhão
- João Lyra, former senator for Alagoas and former federal deputy for Alagoas

Cambodia

- Ang Vong Vathana, former Minister of Justice

Democratic Republic of the Congo

- Jaynet Kabila, Member of the National Assembly

Republic of the Congo

- Bruno Itoua, Minister of Higher Education and former chairman of the SNPC

Ecuador

- Galo Chiriboga, former attorney general
- Pedro Delgado, cousin of President of Ecuador Rafael Correa and former governor of the Central Bank

France

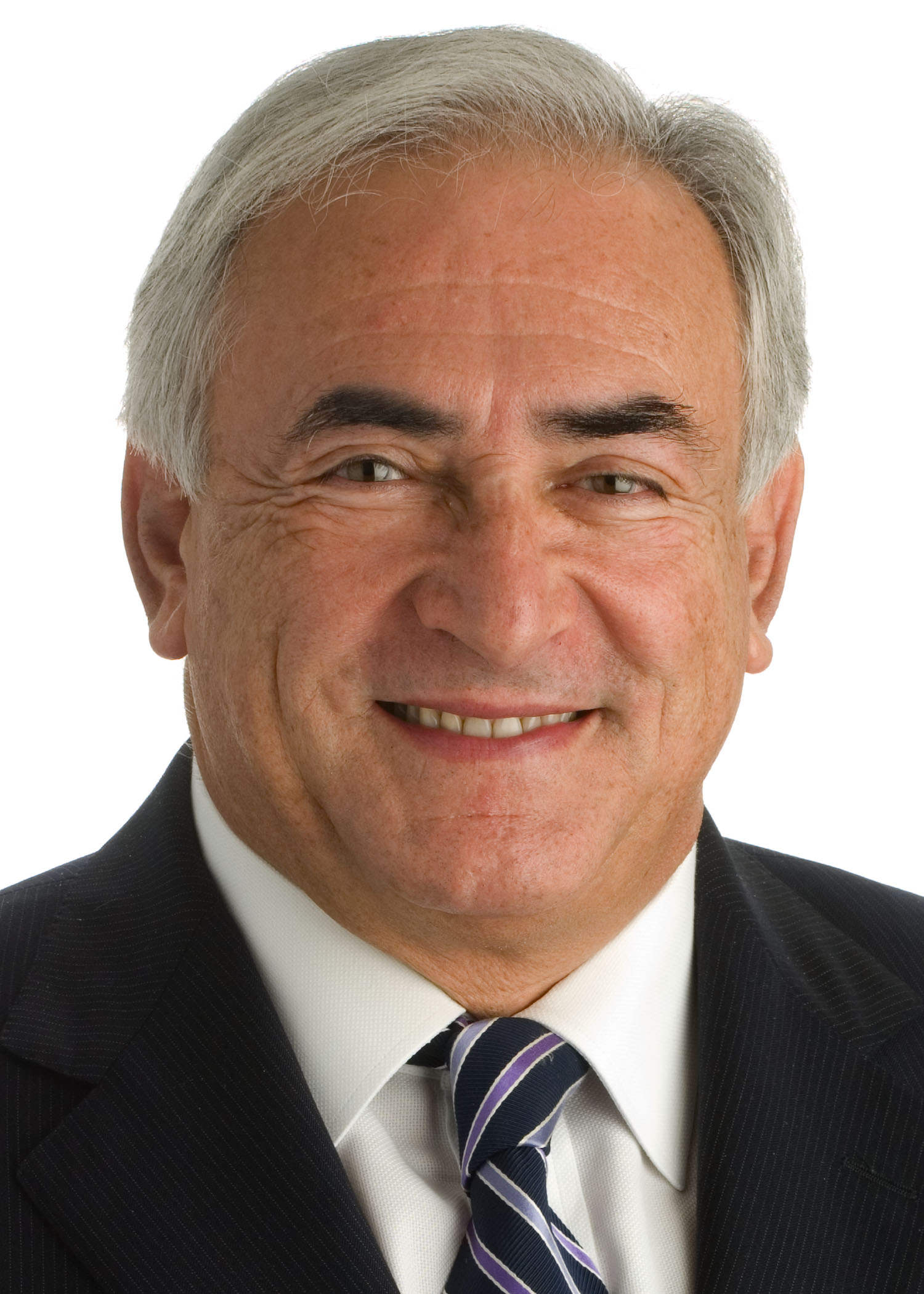
Dominique Strauss-Kahn

- Jérôme Cahuzac, former Minister of the Budget
- Frédéric Chatillon, French businessman, and communications adviser to Front National leader Marine Le Pen
- Jean-Marie Le Pen, former leader of Front National and father of current leader Marine Le Pen
- Jean-Noël Guérini, former president of the General council (conseil général) of Bouches-du-Rhône, a current member of the Senate of France and a member of the municipal council of Marseille
- Dominique Strauss-Kahn, former managing director of the International Monetary Fund and former Minister of Finance

Greece

- Stavros Papastavrou, advisor of former Prime Ministers Kostas Karamanlis and Antonis Samaras

Hungary

- Zsolt Horváth, former Member of the National Assembly

Iceland

- Dorrit Moussaieff, First Lady of Iceland. Wife of president Ólafur Ragnar Grímsson. She has links to offshore accounts.
- Júlíus Vífill Ingvarsson, former Member of the Reykjavík City Council (resigned April 5, 2016 after Panama Papers)
- Ólöf Nordal (d. 2017), former Minister of the Interior

India

- Ravindra Kishore Sinha, former BJP Member of Parliament of the Rajya Sabha for Bihar
- Anil Vasudev Salgaocar (d. 2016), former Member of the Goa Legislative Assembly

Israel

- Yoav Gallant, former Minister of Construction, later appointed Minister of Aliyah and Integration, Education, and Defense until dismissal; currently wanted for war crimes
- Dov Weissglass, former advisor to Prime Minister Ariel Sharon

Italy

- Nicola Di Girolamo, former Member of the Senate

Kenya

- Kalpana Rawal, former Deputy Chief Justice of the Supreme Court

Lebanon

- Elias Bou Saab, former Education Minister, current Deputy Speaker of the Parliament of Lebanon

Malta

- Konrad Mizzi, former Minister of Energy and Health.
- Keith Schembri, former Chief of Staff to Prime Minister Joseph Muscat

Netherlands

- Wopke Hoekstra, former Deputy Prime Minister and former Minister of Finance

Nigeria

- Atiku Abubakar, former Vice President
- James Ibori, former Governor of Delta State
- Olubuse II (d. 2015), former ruler of Ife

North Korea

- Kim Chol-sam, Daedong Credit Bank representative and presumed high official

Pakistan

- Rehman Malik, former Minister of the Interior and former Director General of the Federal Investigation Agency
- Malik Mohammad Qayyum, former Senior Advocate of the Supreme Court and former Attorney General
- Anwar Saifullah, Member of the Senate, former Minister for Petroleum and Natural Resources and former Minister for Environment and Urban Affairs
- Humayun Saifullah, former Member of the National Assembly
- Osman Saifullah, former Member of the Senate
- Salim Saifullah, former Member of the Senate and a Pakistan Muslim League faction leader

Palestine

- Mohammad Mustafa, former Minister of National Economy

Panama

- Riccardo Francolini, former chairman of the state-owned Savings Bank
- Ramón Fonseca, former president of the Panameñista Party until Operation Car Wash, co-founder of Mossack Fonseca (the law firm involved in the Panama Papers leak)

Peru

Philippines

- Maria Imelda "Imee" Marcos Manotoc, Governor of Ilocos Norte, eldest daughter of former president Ferdinand Marcos and his wife Imelda Marcos

Poland

- Paweł Piskorski, former Mayor of Warsaw

Rwanda

- Emmanuel Ndahiro, brigadier general and former chief of the National Intelligence and Security Services

Saudi Arabia

- Muhammad bin Nayef, Crown Prince and Minister of the Interior of Saudi Arabia
- Muhammad bin Fahd, Former Governor of Eastern Province

Spain

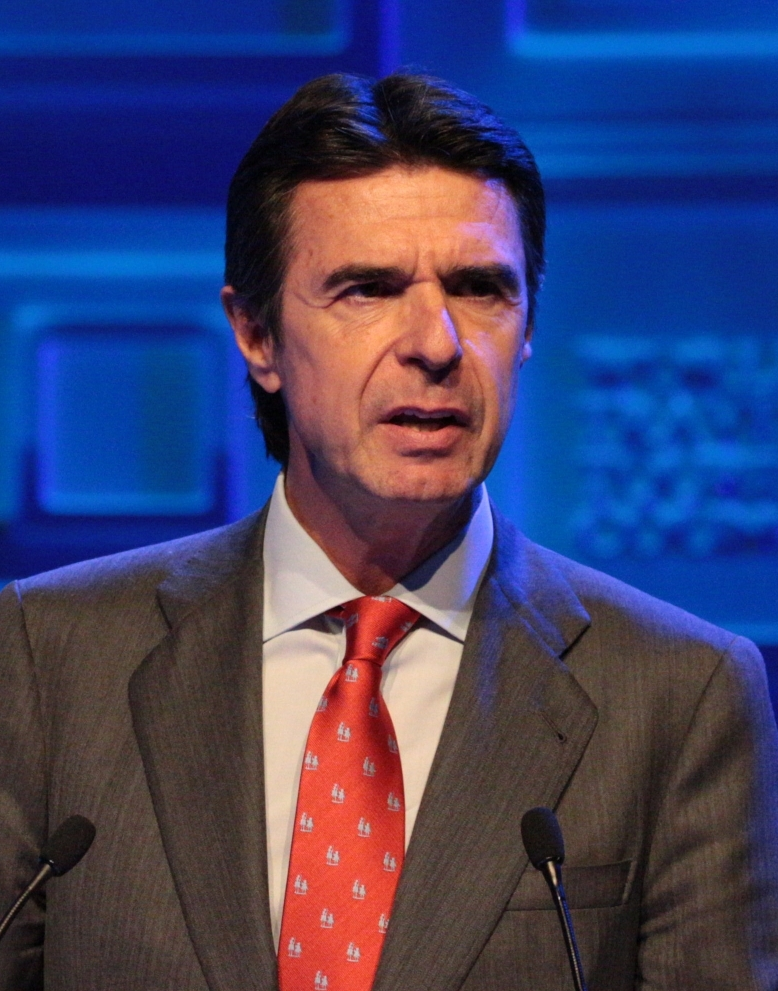
José Manuel Soria

- José Manuel Soria, Minister of Industry, Energy and Tourism. (resigned April 15, 2016, four days after appearing named)
- Rodrigo Rato, former Vice President of the Government of Spain, and former president of Bankia and IMF.
- Ignacio González, former president of the Community of Madrid. His penthouse in Estepona, which is being investigated by the Spanish courts, has links with offshore companies. He has been charged with embezzlement and bribery.
- Antonio Hernández Mancha, retired senator of Senate of Spain and former president of Alianza Popular (nowadays Partido Popular).

United Kingdom

- Michael Ashcroft, retired Member of the House of Lords
- Tony Baldry, former Member of the House of Commons
- David Davies (d. 2025), former Chief Scientific Adviser to the Ministry of Defence
- Michael Mates, former Member of the House of Commons
- Pamela Sharples (d. 2022), Member of the House of Lords

Uruguay

- Sergio Abreu, former Minister of Industry and Ministry of Foreign Relations (Uruguay)
- Pedro Bordaberry, senator and former Minister of Tourism and Sport (2003–2005).
- Edgardo Novick, businessman and leader of "Partido de la Concertación"

Venezuela

- Victor Cruz Weffer, former commander-in-chief of the army
- Jesús Villanueva, former Director of PDVSA

Zambia

- Atan Shansonga, former Ambassador to the United States

=== Relatives and associates of government officials ===
U.K. Prime Minister David Cameron, admitted on April 7, 2016, that he personally benefited from his late father's offshore investment fund disclosed in the leaked Panama Papers.

Azerbaijan

- Mehriban Aliyeva, Leyla Aliyeva, Arzu Aliyeva, Heydar Aliyev, and Sevil Aliyeva, family of President Ilham Aliyev

Canada

- Anthony Merchant, husband of Senator Pana Merchant

China

- Deng Jiagui, brother-in-law of paramount leader and General Secretary Xi Jinping
- Li Xiaolin, daughter of former Premier Li Peng

Ecuador

Egypt

- Alaa Mubarak, son of former President Hosni Mubarak

France

- Frédéric Chatillon, business associate of Marine Le Pen, leader of the National Front
- Nicolas Crochet, accounting associate of Marine Le Pen, leader of the National Front
- Jean-Marie Le Pen, former leader of the National Front and father of current party leader Marine Le Pen
- Isabelle Balkany, wife of Patrick Balkany

Ghana

- John Addo Kufuor, son of former President John Kufuor

Guinea

- Mamadie Touré, widow of former President Lansana Conté

Ireland

- Frank Flannery, political consultant and Fine Gael's former Director of Organisations and Strategy

India

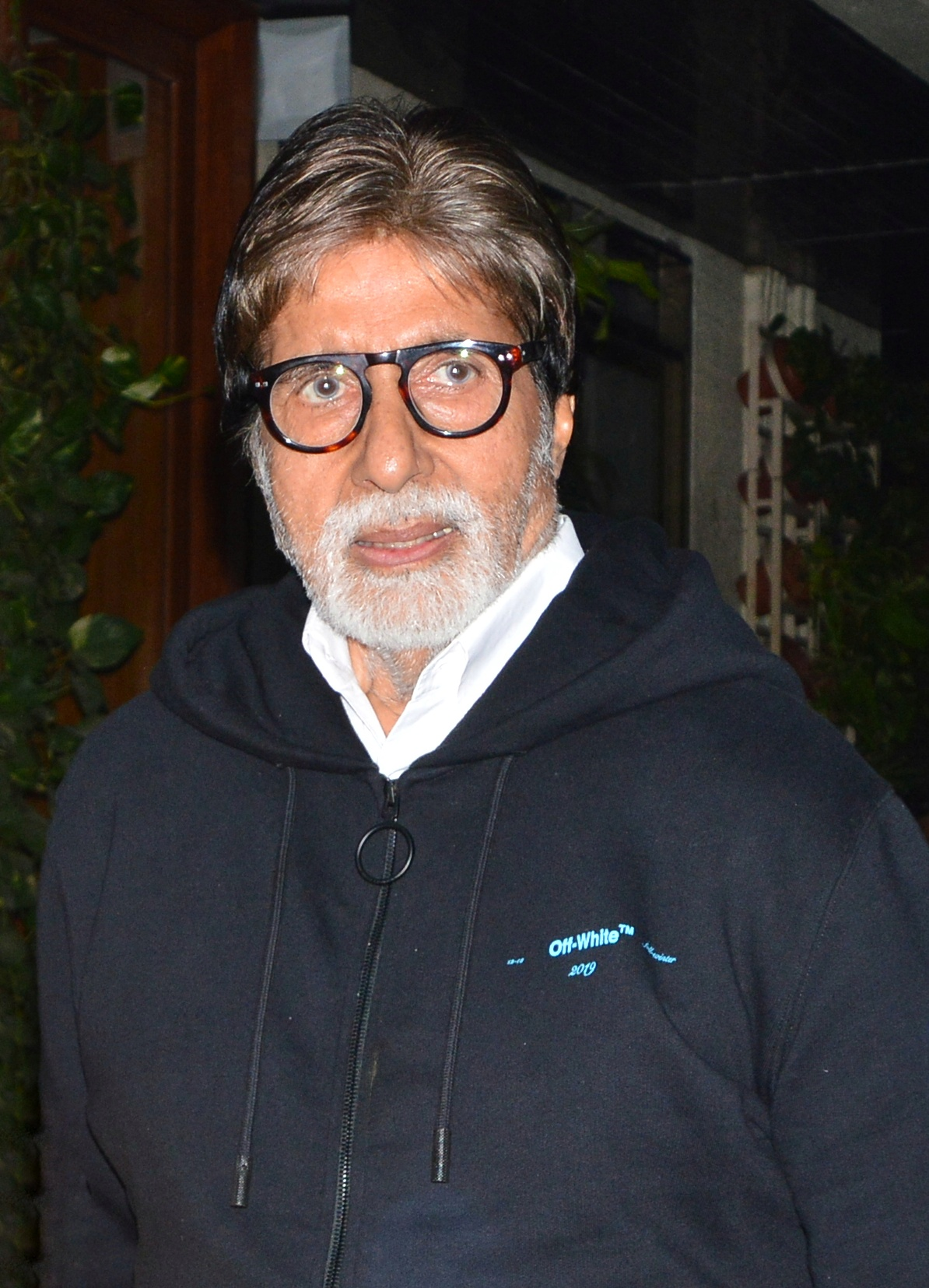
According to the leaked papers, Indian actor Amitabh Bachchan who works in Bollywood, was a director of four shipping firms set up in the British Virgin Islands and the Bahamas.

- Amitabh Bachchan, an Indian actor, film producer, and television host, widely recognized for his extensive career in Hindi cinema
- Vinod Adani, Businessperson and elder brother of Gautam Adani, Adani Group
- Harish Salve, former Solicitor General and son of N. K. P. Salve, veteran Indian National Congress politician

Madagascar

- Mamy Ravatomanga, Malagasy businessman, owner of the Sodiat group and close adviser to President Andry Rajoelina

Malaysia

- Mohd Nazifuddin Najib, son of Prime Minister Najib Razak, Dr. Khadizah Aman Osman, Daughter of Federal Minister and their cousin

Mexico

- Juan Armando Hinojosa, "favourite contractor" of President Enrique Peña Nieto

Morocco

- Mounir Majidi, personal secretary of King Mohammed VI

Pakistan

- Maryam Nawaz, Hasan Nawaz Sharif and Hussain Nawaz Sharif, children of Prime Minister Nawaz Sharif

Philippines

- Irene Marcos Araneta, youngest daughter of the late former president of the Philippines, Ferdinand Marcos and former First Lady, Imelda Romualdez Marcos, youngest sister of Maria Imelda "Imee" Marcos Manotoc, Governor of Ilocos Norte and Ferdinand "Bongbong" Marcos Jr, Senator and former member of the Philippine House of Representatives from Ilocos Norte
- Matthew Joseph Manotoc, son of Maria Imelda "Imee" Marcos, Governor of Ilocos Norte, grandson of former First Lady Imelda Marcos

Russia

- Sergei Roldugin, friend of President Vladimir Putin
- Arkady Rotenberg, friend of President Vladimir Putin
- Boris Rotenberg, friend of President Vladimir Putin

Saudi Arabia

- Salman bin Abdulaziz bin Salman Al Saud, member of the Saudi royal family

South Africa

- Khulubuse Zuma, nephew of President Jacob Zuma

South Korea

- Ro Jae-Hun, son of former President Roh Tae-woo

Spain

- Associates of the Spanish royal family:
  - Infanta Pilar de Borbón (d. 2020), sister of former king Juan Carlos I, and her husband Luis Gómez-Acebo
  - Iñaki Urdangarin, former Duke of Palma and husband of Infanta Cristina; advised by Mossack Fonseca and previously involved in the Nóos affair
  - Corinna zu Sayn-Wittgenstein-Sayn, Danish-German philanthropist and businesswoman; former mistress of Juan Carlos I
- Borja Thyssen, son of Carmen Cervera, Baroness Thyssen-Bornemisza
- Francisco Paesa, a former agent of the Spanish National Intelligence Centre

Syria

- Rami and Hafez Makhlouf, cousins of former President Bashar al-Assad

United Kingdom

- Sarah, Duchess of York, former wife of Prince Andrew
- Ian Cameron, father of former Prime Minister David Cameron
- Mark Thatcher, son of former Prime Minister Margaret Thatcher

United Nations

- Kojo Annan, son of former Secretary-General Kofi Annan

== Non-government officials/organizations ==
=== International Federation of Association Football ===
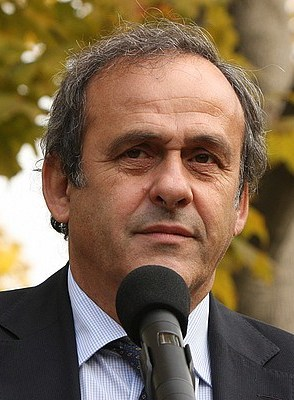
Michel Platini

Persons associated with the world governing body FIFA

- (Uruguay) Juan Pedro Damiani, Uruguayan member of the FIFA Ethics Committee. Resigned on 6 April 2016.
- (Argentina) Eduardo Deluca, former secretary general of CONMEBOL
- (Uruguay) (United States) Eugenio Figueredo, Uruguayan-American former president of CONMEBOL and vice president of FIFA
- (Switzerland) (Italy) Gianni Infantino, Swiss-Italian President of FIFA
- (Argentina) Hugo and Mariano Jinkis, Argentine businessmen also implicated in the 2015 FIFA corruption case
- (Paraguay) (Colombia) Nicolás Leoz, former president of CONMEBOL
- (France) Michel Platini, French former president of UEFA
- (France) Jérôme Valcke, French former secretary general of FIFA

Football team owners and executives

- (Spain) Josep Lluís Nuñez (d. 2018), Spanish businessman, president of FC Barcelona from 1978 to 2000
- (Spain) Carles Vilarrubí Carrió (d. 2025), Spanish businessman and vice-president of FC Barcelona
- Real Sociedad (Spain) and its presidents—principally Iñaki Otegui—under the leadership of José Luis Astiazarán, Miguel Fuentes, María de la Peña, Juan Larzábal, and Iñaki Badiola
- (France) (Poland) Waldemar Kita, Franco-Polish businessman, president of Football Club de Nantes
- (Republic of Ireland) Dermot Desmond, Irish businessman and majority shareholder of Celtic F.C.
- (Russia) Dmitry Rybolovlev, Russian businessman, president of AS Monaco
- (Uruguay) Daniel Fonseca, Uruguayan former footballer, now a football agent.
- (France) Robert Louis-Dreyfus, French businessman, owner of Olympique de Marseille
- (Greece) Sokratis Kokkalis, Greek businessman, former owner of Olympiacos F.C.

Football players

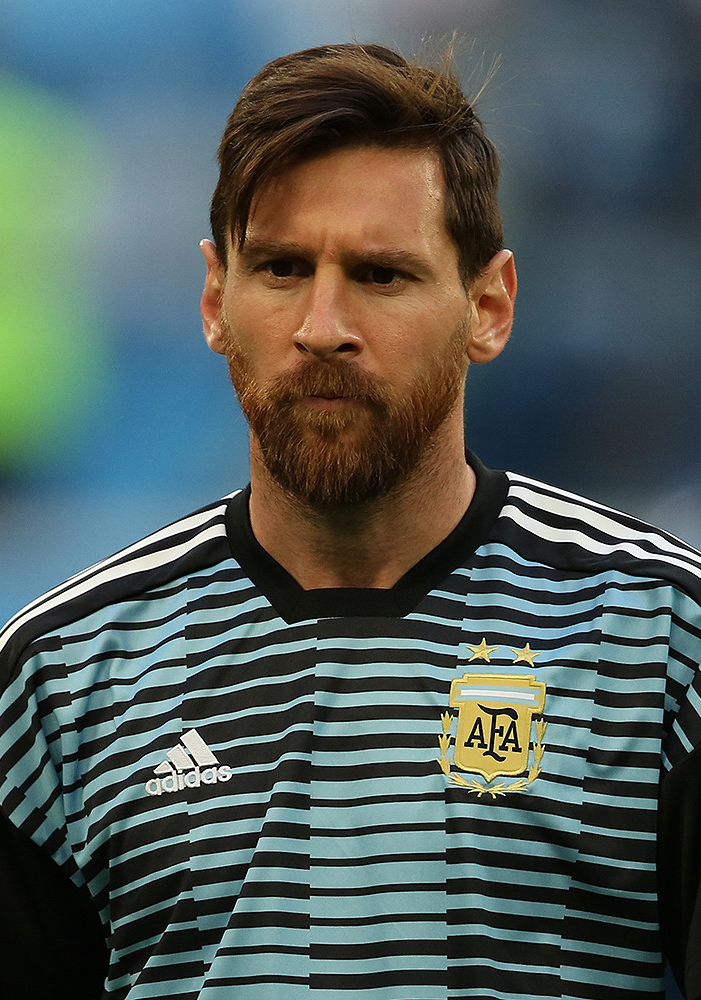
Lionel Messi

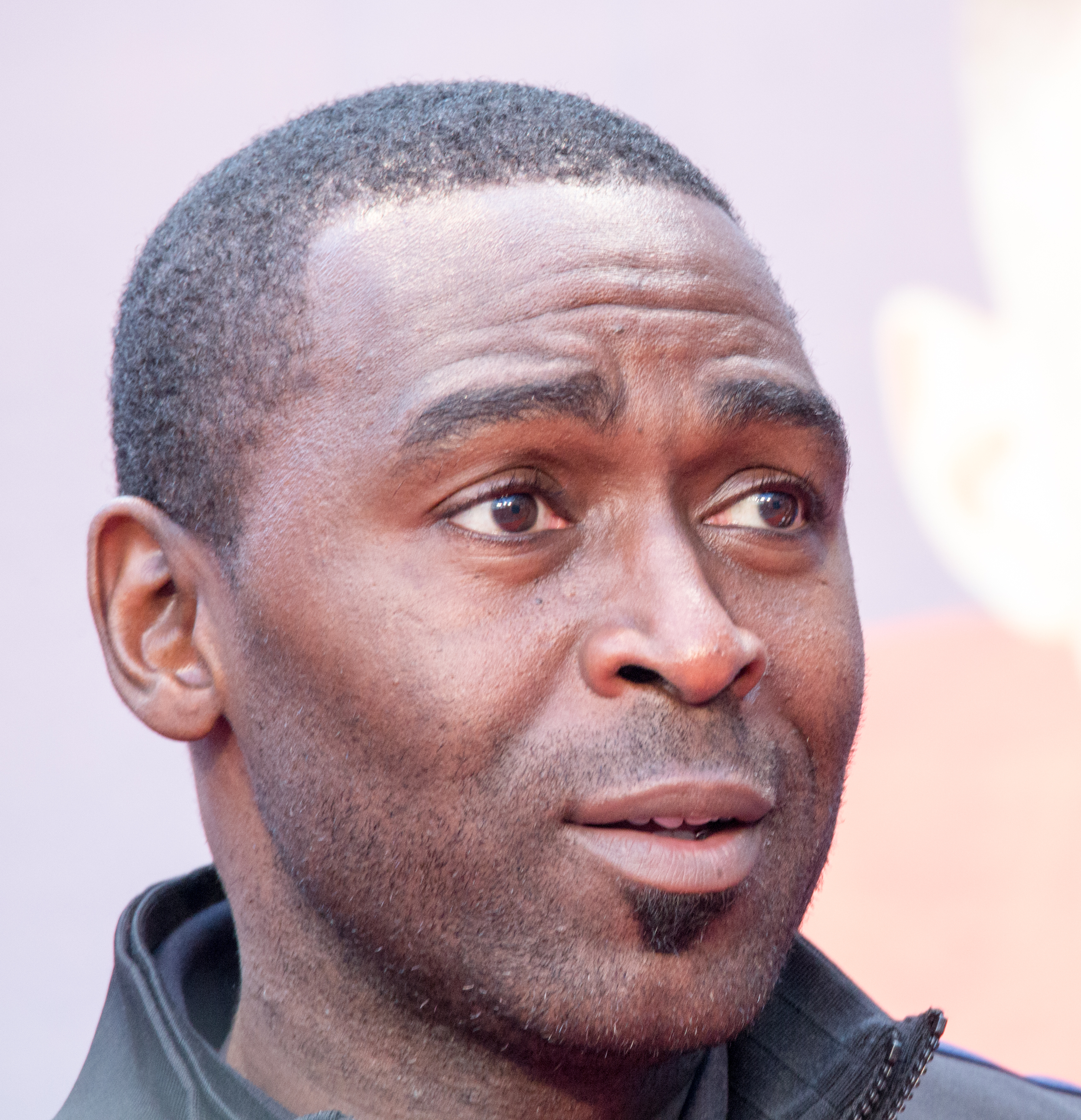
Andy Cole

- (Sweden) Mattias Asper, Swedish retired goalkeeper
- (Russia) Valeri Karpin, Russian retired midfielder, current coach of FC Torpedo Armavir
- (Turkey) Nihat Kahveci, Turkish retired footballer
- (Turkey) Tayfun Korkut, Turkish retired footballer and manager
- (Serbia) Darko Kovačević, Serbian retired footballer
- (Argentina) Gabriel Schürrer, Argentine retired defender
- (Netherlands) Sander Westerveld, Dutch retired goalkeeper, current coach of Ajax Cape Town
- (United Kingdom) Andy Cole, English former footballer
- (Argentina) Gabriel Heinze, Argentine former footballer, account with his mother.
- (United Kingdom) Kevin Keegan, English former footballer and manager
- (Argentina) Lionel Messi, Argentine footballer for Inter Miami FC, and his father Jorge Horacio Messi
- (Denmark) Brian Steen Nielsen, Danish former footballer and sports director of Aarhus Gymnastikforening
- (Denmark) Marc Rieper, Danish retired footballer
- (Netherlands) Clarence Seedorf, Dutch retired footballer
- (Argentina) Leonardo Ulloa, Argentine footballer
- (Brazil) Willian Borges da Silva, Brazilian footballer formerly of Chelsea, now playing for Fulham
- (Chile) Iván Zamorano, Chilean retired footballer, account during Real Madrid years
- (Uruguay) Diego Forlán, Uruguayan footballer who plays for Peñarol, as well his mother Pilar Corazo and his brother Pablo

=== Motorsports ===
- (Spain) Àlex Crivillé, Spanish former Grand Prix motorcycle road racer
- (Germany) Nico Rosberg, German 2016 Formula 1 World Champion
- (Italy) Jarno Trulli, Italian former Formula 1 driver

=== Other sports ===
- (United States) Bobby Fischer, late American former chess grandmaster and 11th World Chess Champion
- (United Kingdom) Nick Faldo, English professional golfer on the PGA European Tour, now mainly an on-air golf analyst
- (Republic of Ireland) Pádraig Harrington, Irish professional golfer on the European Tour and the PGA Tour who has won three major championships
- (Romania) Ion Țiriac, retired Romanian professional tennis player and businessman
- (Dominican Republic) Alfonso Soriano, American Major League Baseball player

=== Media personalities ===
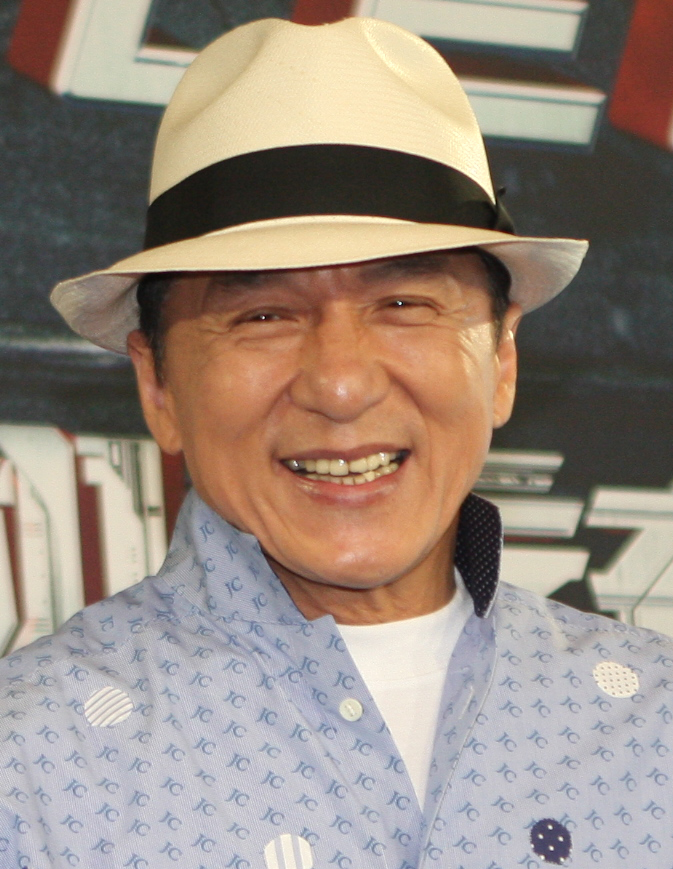
Hong Kong actor Jackie Chan

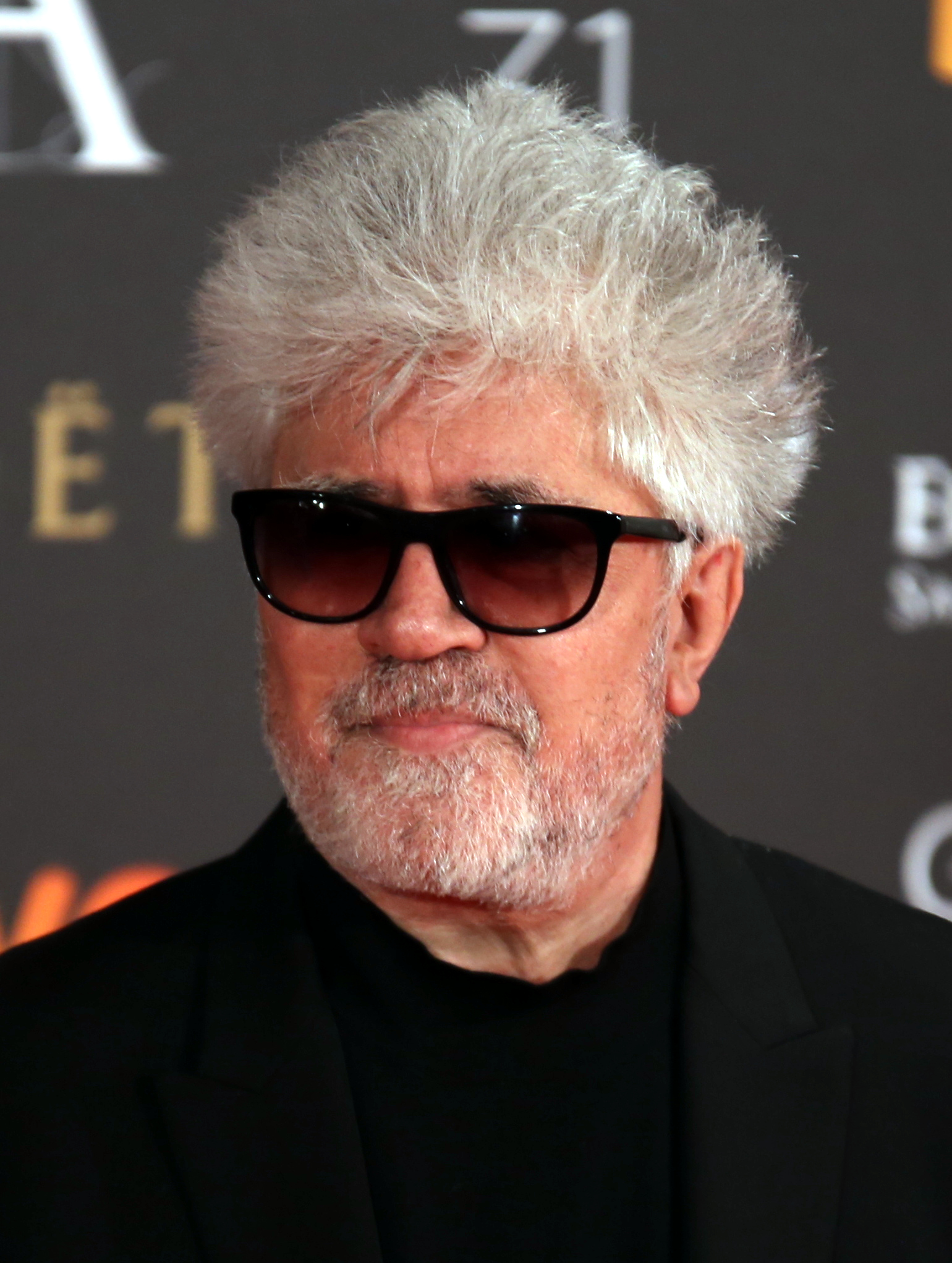
Pedro Almodovar

Simon Cowell

- (Republic of Ireland) Paul McGuinness, Irish manager of Irish rock group U2
- (Spain) Bertín Osborne, Spanish singer and TV personality
- (Spain) Pedro Almodóvar, Spanish film director, screenwriter, producer and former actor
- (Spain) Agustín Almodóvar, Spanish film producer and younger brother of filmmaker Pedro Almodóvar
- (Spain) Imanol Arias, Spanish actor
- (Spain) (Peru) Mario Vargas Llosa (d. 2025), Spanish-Peruvian writer, winner of the Nobel Prize in Literature
- (Spain) Juan Luis Cebrián, Spanish journalist, co-founder of El País, CEO of Prisa, Spanish media conglomerate
- (Spain) Carmen Lomana, Spanish celebrity and socialite
- (India) Amitabh Bachchan, Indian actor
- (India) Aishwarya Rai Bachchan, Indian actress and former Miss World
- (United States) Stanley Kubrick, American filmmaker
- (United States) Emilio Estevez, American actor, director, and writer
- (United States) David Geffen, American business magnate, producer, film studio executive, philanthropist and co-founder of DreamWorks
- Jackie Chan, Hong Kong actor
- (United Kingdom) Emma Watson, English actress
- (United Kingdom) Simon Cowell, English reality television personality, entrepreneur, film, record, and television producer
- (United Kingdom) Paul Burrell, former butler to Princess Diana
- (Italy) Barbara D'Urso, Italian television actress and singer
- (Italy) Franco Dragone, Italian-Belgian theatre director, best known for his work for Cirque du Soleil
- (Italy) Carlo Verdone, Italian actor, screenwriter and film director
- (Mexico) Edith González, Mexican actress and dancer.
- (Mexico) Alfonso de Angoitia, Mexican Executive Vice President of Grupo Televisa, S.A.
- (Puerto Rico) Daddy Yankee, Puerto Rican singer, songwriter, record producer and actor
- (Dominican Republic) Juan Luis Guerra, Dominican singer
- (Colombia) Juanes, Colombian singer
- (Uruguay) Orlando Petinatti, Uruguayan entertainer and radio host
- (Taiwan) Nicky Wu, Taiwanese actor

=== Business people ===
Bahamas

- Solomon Humes, Bahamian bishop of the Church of God of Prophecy

Canada

- Louise Blouin, Montreal native, former businesswoman
- Frank Giustra, Canadian mining magnate
- David Ho, Vancouver billionaire facing criminal charges

China

- Ng Lap Seng, Macau-based real estate businessman

France

- Gérard Autajon, French businessman
- Robert Louis-Dreyfus, French former CEO of Adidas
- Pierre Papillaud, French billionaire businessman

India

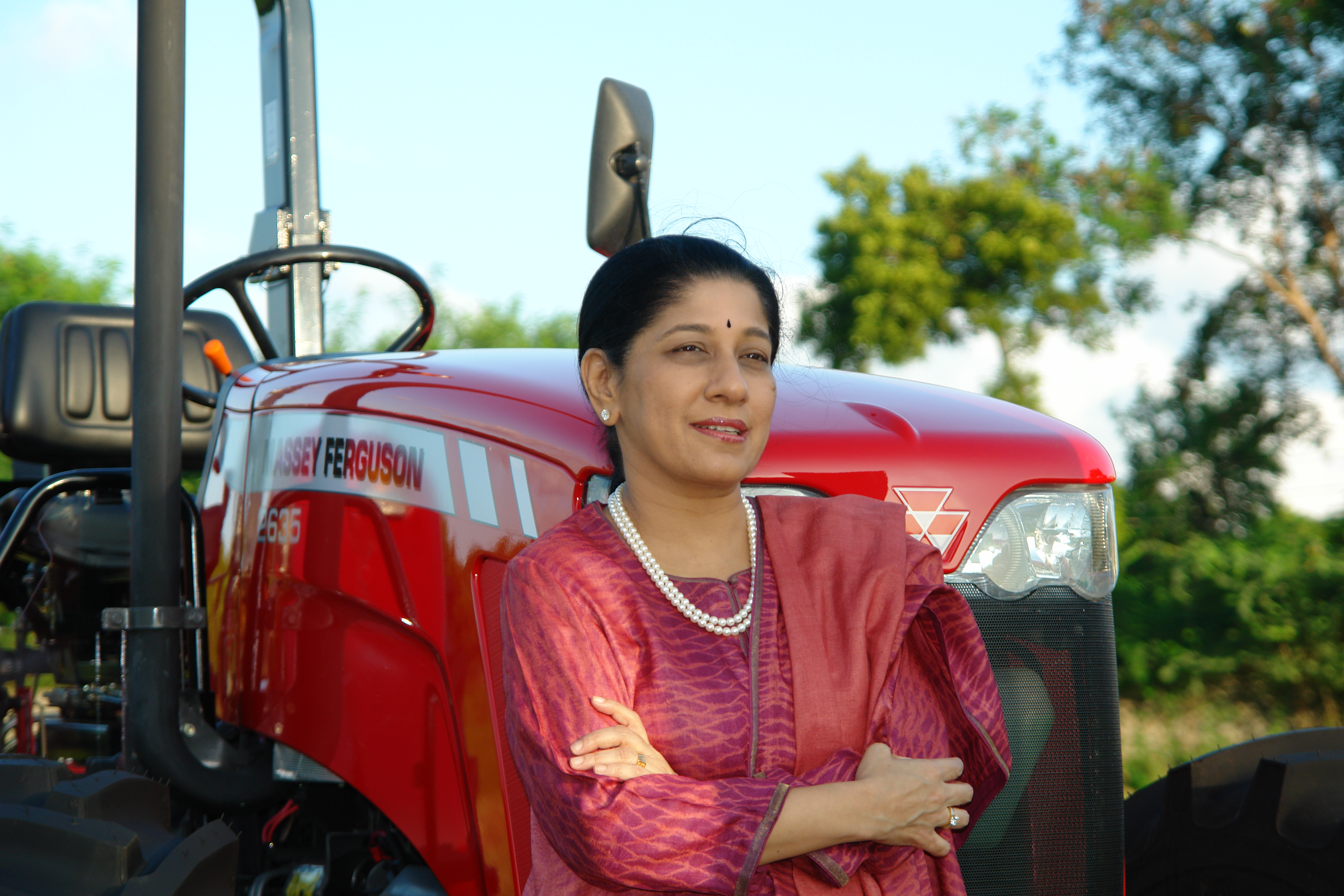
Mallika Srinivasan

- Shishir Bajoria, Indian promoter of SK Bajoria Group, which has steel refractory units
- Mohan Lal Lohia, Indian, father of Sri Prakash Lohia, founder and chairman of Indorama Corporation
- Rattan Chadha, Indian-born Dutch businessman, founder of Mexx clothing
- Abdul Rashid Mir, kashmiri founder and CEO of Cottage Industries Exposition Limited (CIE) and Tabasum Mir
- Abasaheb Garware family from India's Maharashtra state
- Onkar Kanwar, Indian chairman & MD of Apollo Tyres
- Mallika Srinivasan, chairman and CEO of TAFE - Tractors and Farm Equipment Limited and Indira Sivasailam
- K P Singh, chairman and CEO of DLF (company).
- Vijay Mallya, Indian businessman and former Member of Parliament of the Rajya Sabha

Indonesia

- Robbyanto Budiman, Indonesian businessman

Ireland

- Sean Mulryan, Irish property developer

Israel

- Idan Ofer, London-based Israeli business magnate, founder of Tanker Pacific
- Teddy Sagi, a London-based Israeli billionaire businessman founder of Playtech and the majority shareholder of Market Tech Holdings, which owns London's Camden Market, and of two AIM-listed technology companies
- Bank Leumi's Israeli bank: representatives and board members
- Jacob Engel, Israeli businessman active in the African mining industry
- Dan Gertler, Israeli billionaire businessman, founder and president of the Dan Gertler International
- Jacob Weinroth, Israeli attorney, founding partner of Dr. J. Weinroth & Co law office, and owner and director of Sapir Holdings
- Lev Avnerovich Leviev, Israeli businessman, philanthropist, investor and owner of Lexinter International Inc., which holds shares in Vauxhall Securities Inc, and chairman of the Africa-Israel Investments corporation.
- Beny Steinmetz, Israeli businessman, with diamond-mining, engineering and real estate companies, and his business partner and brother Daniel Steinmetz

Italy

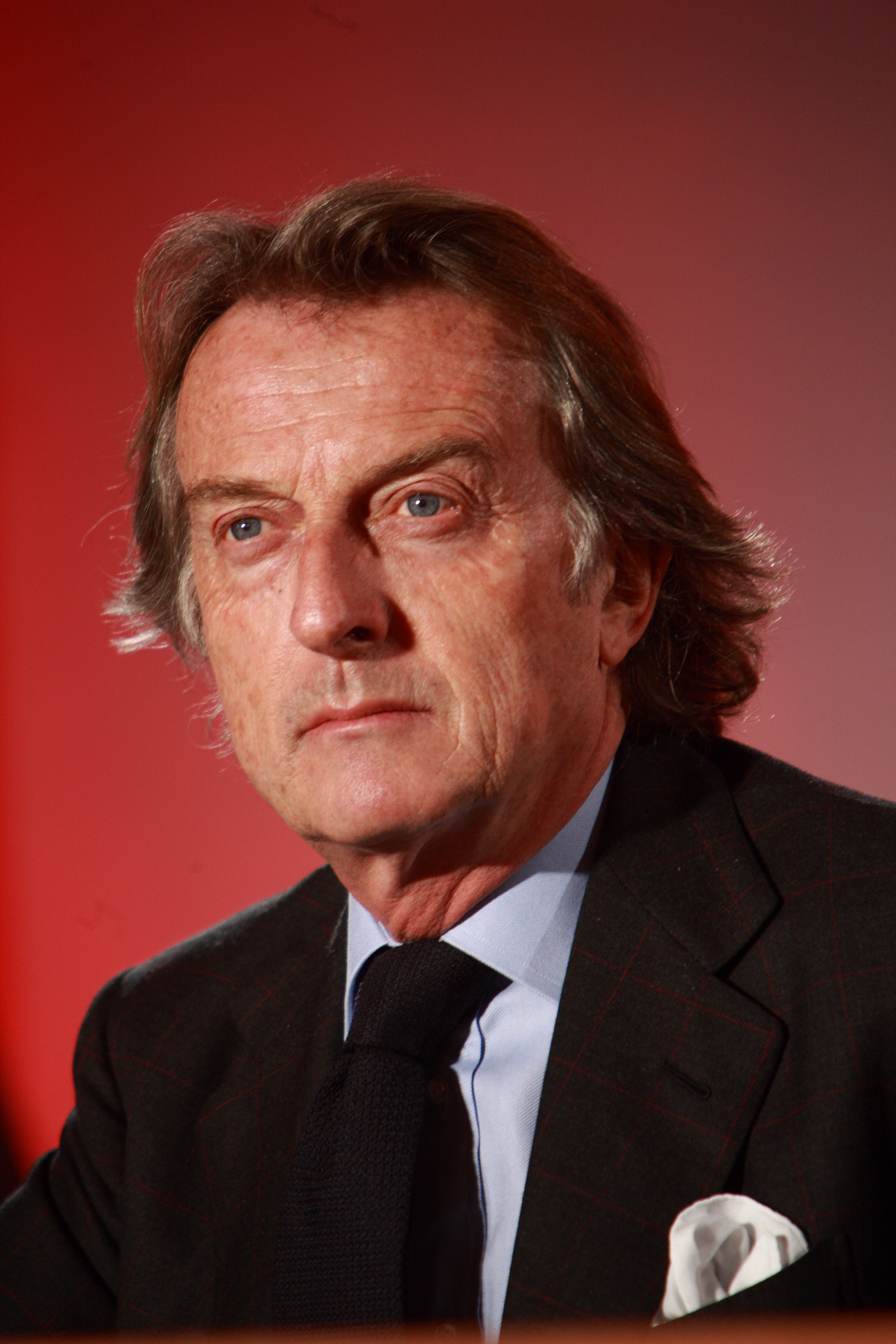
Luca Cordero di Montezemolo

- Adriano Chimento, Italian jeweler
- Luca Cordero di Montezemolo, Italian businessman and politician
- Valentino Garavani, Italian fashion designer and founder of the Valentino SpA brand and company, and his partner Giancarlo Giammetti
- Gabriele Volpi, Italian-born Nigerian businessman

Malaysia

- Vishen Lakhiani, co-founder and CEO of Mindvalley, and author of The Code of the Extraordinary Mind

Mexico

- Ricardo Salinas Pliego, Mexican billionaire business mogul, who is owner of Felicitas Holdings Limited, a company incorporated in the British Virgin Islands

Morocco

- Richard Attias, Moroccan businessman and husband of Cecilia Attias, former wife of French president Nicolas Sarkozy

Netherlands

- Bert Meerstadt, board member of ABN-AMRO bank and former head of Dutch Railways

Nigeria

- Ronald Chagoury, CEO of Nigerian construction company Chagoury Group.

Pakistan

- Sadruddin Hashwani, Pakistani businessman, chairman of Hashoo Group, and his son Murtaza Hashwani
- Hussain Dawood, Pakistani businessman, chairman of Dawood Hercules Corporation Limited, Engro Corporation Limited, Hub Power Company Limited, Pakistan Poverty Alleviation Fund and the Dawood Foundation

Panama

- Ramón Fonseca Mora, co-founder of law firm Mossack Fonseca which is central to the investigation
- Jürgen Mossack, co-founder of law firm Mossack Fonseca which is central to the investigation

Saudi Arabia

- Omar Aggad, Saudi businessman and former director of Arab Palestinian Investment Company (APIC), and his son Tarek Aggad, current chairman, CEO and owner of 27% of the company

Serbia

- Roksanda Ilincic, Serbian fashion designer

Spain

- Alberto Cortina and his cousin Alberto Alcocer, Spanish businessmen, owners of Grupo ACS, the biggest construction company in the world and of 21% of Ence, the largest paper pulp and biomass energy company in Europe
- Javier de la Rosa and his daughter Gabriela de la Rosa, Spanish businessman and lawyer.
- Miguel Blesa, Spanish financial officer, banker and president of the board of Caja Madrid from 1996 to 2009, which since 2013 is being investigated by judicial irregularities during his tenure and arrested by this corruption scandal.
- Eufemiano Fuentes, Spanish sports doctor, implicated in the Operación Puerto doping case
- Carlos Ortega, CEO of Pepe Jeans, Spanish clothing group

Sweden

- Percy Barnevik, Swedish businessman, former CEO and chairman of ABB
- Anders Wall, Swedish financier, former chairman of Volvo

Switzerland

- Glencore, Swiss company of formerly fugitive multinational hedge fund manager Marc Rich

United Kingdom

- Arron Banks, British political donor to the Tories and UKIP
- David and Frederick Barclay, British retail and media moguls
- Rocco Forte, British hotelier
- Peter Goldstein, British co-founder of Superdrug
- Stuart Thomson Gulliver, British banking business executive, CEO of HSBC
- Anthony Gumbiner, British businessman, chairman of Hallman Group
- John Jennings, former chairman of Shell
- Soulieman Marouf, British-Syrian businessman
- Heather Mills, British entrepreneur and environmentalist
- Richard Morris, British industrialist
- Nigel Rudd, British businessman
- Div Murti, UK based businessman

United States of America

- Sanford I. Weill, when he was CEO of Citigroup, set up an offshore company for his yacht
- Kjell Gunnar Finstad, Texas resident with an offshore oil business
- Igor Olenicoff, American billionaire
- Benjamin Wey, Chinese American financier, and president of New York Global Group
- Nakash family members

Uzbekistan

- Patokh Chodiev, Uzbek billionaire, oligarch; and two of his relatives, Alexander Machkevitch and Alijan Ibragimov

Venezuela

- Javier Bertucci, evangelical pastor, businessman and presidential candidate.

Dual nationals

- (Germany) (United Kingdom) Ronald Grierson, German-born British banker
- (Lebanon) (Monaco) David Nahmad, Lebanese-Monegasque retired art dealer
- (Romania) (Australia) Frank Timiș, Romanian-born Australian businessman

Non-governmental organizations

=== Organized crime ===
- (Mexico) Rafael Caro Quintero, Mexican drug trafficker and one of the founders of the now-disintegrated Guadalajara Cartel
- Iqbal Mirchi, right-hand man of India's most wanted criminal, Dawood Ibrahim
- (Mexico) Gerardo González Valencia, suspected Mexican drug lord and money launderer; former member of the Jalisco New Generation Cartel (CJNG).
- (Mexico) Abigael González Valencia, suspected Mexican drug lord and money launderer; former leader of the CJNG.
- (Mexico) Nemesio Oseguera Cervantes, suspected Mexican drug lord and leader of the CJNG.

== See also ==
- List of people and organisations named in the Paradise Papers
- List of people named in the Pandora Papers
