= Aggad =

Aggad (Arabic: العقاد, romanized: al-ʿAqqād, lit. 'the rope-maker') is an Arabic surname. Notable people with the surname include:

- Foued Mohamed-Aggad (c. 1992–2015), French terrorist
- Omar Aggad (1927–2018), Saudi-Palestinian businessman
- Tarek Aggad (born 1971), Saudi businessman

== See also ==
- Aggadah
- Al-Aqqad
- Alaqad
- Akkad (disambiguation)
