= John Rudey =

American businessman

- Education: Harvard Business School, MBA
- Occupation: Businessman
- Spouse: Laurie Rudey

John Rudey is an American businessman in the timber business.

== Biography ==
=== Early life ===
He graduated from Harvard University and received an M.B.A. from the Harvard Business School.

=== Career ===
Since 1992, he has been Chairman of the U.S. Timberlands Services Company, Manager of the U.S. Timberlands Klamath Falls of Klamath Falls, Oregon, and Chief Executive Officer of Garrin Properties Holdings. Since 2003, he has been Chairman, CEO and President of Inland Fiber Group. He also serves as Chairman, CEO and President of the American Forest Services.

He sits on the Board of Directors of the Harvard Business School Club of Greater New York.

=== Personal life ===
He is married to Laurie Rudey.

In 1985, he purchased Copper Beech Farm, an estate in Greenwich, Connecticut, from the family of Harriet Lauder Greenway. It was sold in April 2014 for US$120 million. In January 2013, they also sold their corner apartment at 1030 Fifth Avenue in Manhattan to Mexican media mogul Alfonso de Angoitia for US$16.5 million.
