= Siniora (company) =

Multinational food industry company

Siniora Food and Manufacturing
- Native name: شركة سنيورة للصناعات الغذائية
- Company type: Public Limited Company
- Founded: 1920; 105 years ago in Palestine (as Siniora Jerusalem)
- Website: http://www.siniorafood.com/

Siniora Food and Manufacturing plc. Is a multinational food industry company that produces meat products in Palestine, Jordan, and Saudi Arabia.

Siniora (Also spelled Sanyoora, Sinyoora, Sunyoora, and Sanyoura) is well known in the Arab World for its Mortadella.

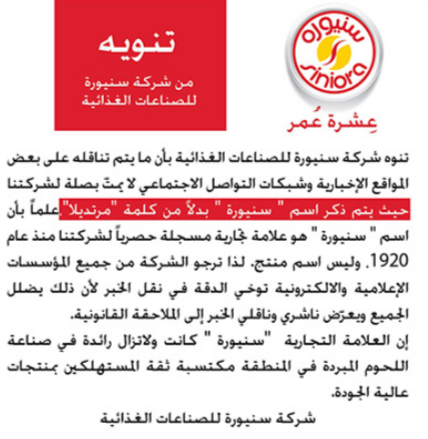
Screenshot of the prompt in Siniora's website warning the viewer that the name "Siniora" had become synonymous with "Mortadella" and warns that any allegations made on the internet about "Siniora" can actually be allegations about Mortadella as a whole and not the company itself.

== Name Change ==
Siniora Jerusalem was a very reputable name in the Arab World until 1996 when the Arab Palestinian Investment Company (AIPC) acquired the Palestinian branch of Siniora Jerusalem and renamed it to its current name.
