= Ndahiro =

Ndahiro is a Rwandan name. Notable people by that name include:

- Emmanuel Ndahiro, chief of the intelligence agency of Rwanda until 2011.
- Ndahiro II Cyamatare, Mwami of the Kingdom of Rwanda at the end of the fifteenth century and father to Ruganzu II Ndoli.
