= Finstad =

Finstad is a surname of Norwegian origin. Notable people with the surname include:

- Arnstein Finstad (born 1978), Norwegian cross-country skier
- Brad Finstad (born 1976), American politician
- Eva R. Finstad (1933–1998), Norwegian politician
- Jonny Finstad (born 1966), Norwegian politician
- Kjell G. Finstad (born 1939), Norwegian businessman
- Morten Finstad (born 1967), Norwegian former ice hockey player
- Ole J. Finstad (1878–1960), American lawyer and politician
- Suzanne Finstad (born 1955), American author, biographer, journalist, producer, and lawyer
- Thomas Finstad (born 1978), Norwegian footballer
