= Marouf (surname) =

Marouf is a surname. Notable people with the surname include:

- Saeid Marouf (born 1985), Iranian volleyball player
- Soulieman Marouf (born 1972), British businessman
- Taha Muhie-eldin Marouf (1924–2009), Iraqi politician

== See also ==
- Marouf (given name)
