= Akkad =

Akkad may refer to:

- Akkad (city), the capital of the Akkadian Empire
- Akkadian Empire, the first ancient empire of Mesopotamia
- Akkad SC, Iraqi football club

== People with the name ==
- Abbas el-Akkad (1889–1964), Egyptian writer
- Abdulrahman Akkad (born 1998), Syrian LGBT activist
- Hassan Akkad, Syrian-British photographer and filmmaker
- Mohammed Akkad, Syrian politician, Governor of Aleppo 2012 to 2014
- Moustapha Akkad (1930–2005), Syrian-American film producer and director
- Omar El Akkad (born 1982), Egyptian-Canadian novelist and journalist

== See also ==
- Aggad
- Alaqad
- List of kings of Akkad
- "Akkad Bakkad", a song from the 2016 Indian film Sanam Re
- Akkad Bakkad Bambey Bo, an Indian television series
- Akkad Bakkad Rafu Chakkar, an Indian web series
- Akkadian language, an ancient language of Mesopotamia
