= Marouf (given name) =

Marouf is a given name. Notable people with the name include:

- Marouf al-Bakhit (born 1947), Jordanian politician
- Marouf Nodeyi (1753–1838), Kurdish poet and scholar
- Marouf Tchakei (born 1995), Togolese footballer

== See also ==
- Marouf (surname)
