= Panama Papers and South America =

Countries with politicians, public officials or close associates implicated in the leak on April 15, 2016 (As of May 19, 2016)

The Panama Papers are 11.5 million leaked documents that detail financial and attorney-client information for more than 214,488 offshore entities. The documents, some dating back to the 1970s, were created by and taken from, Panamanian law firm and corporate service provider Mossack Fonseca, and were leaked in 2015 by an anonymous source.

This page details related allegations, reactions, and investigations, in South America.

== Argentina ==
=== Mauricio Macri ===
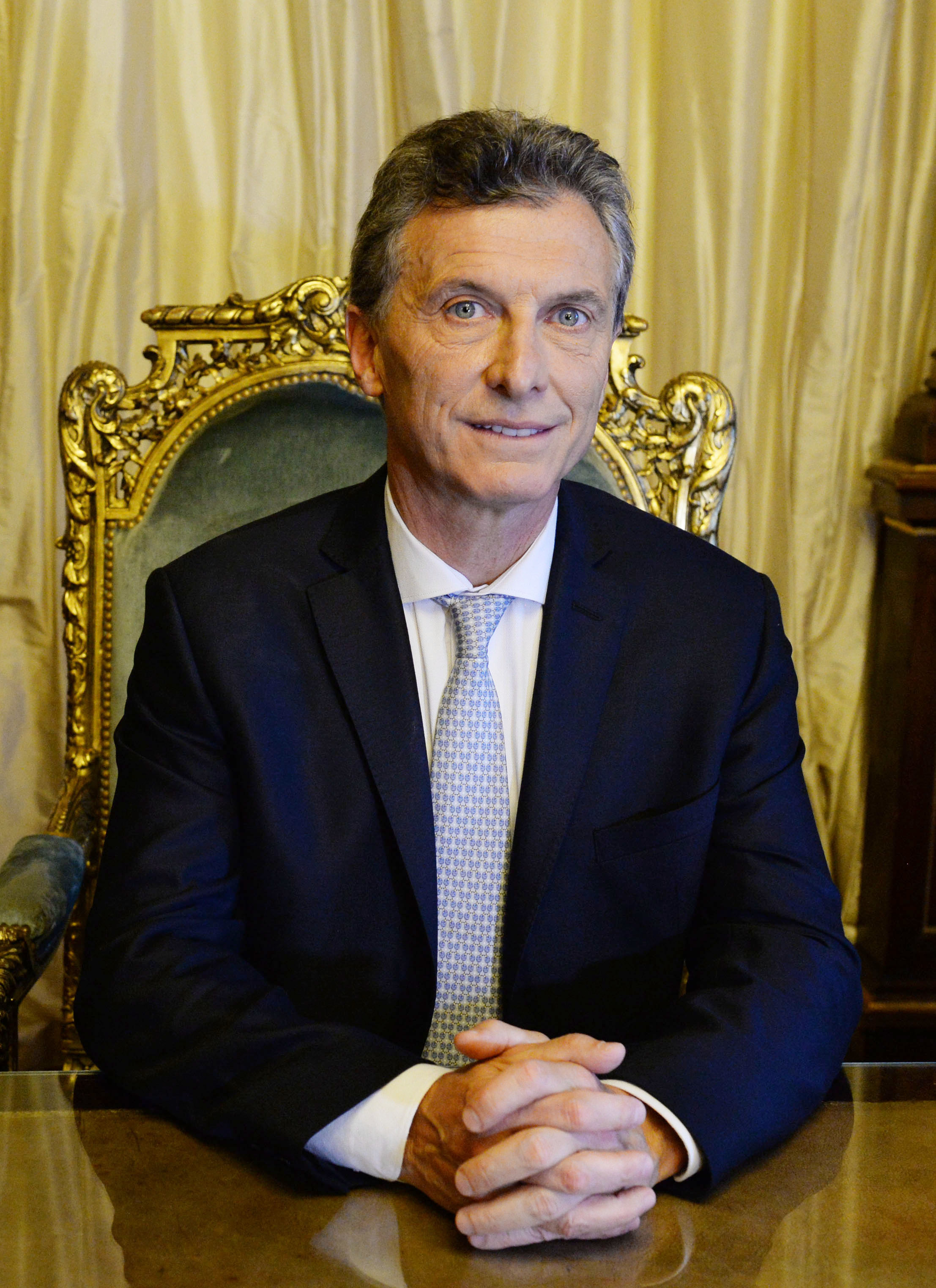
Argentine President Mauricio Macri

Argentine President Mauricio Macri is listed as head of a trading company based in the Bahamas that he did not disclose during his tenure as Mayor of Buenos Aires; it is not clear whether disclosure of non-equity directorships was then required under Argentine law.

On April 7, 2016, federal prosecutor Federico Delgado began a formal investigation into Macri's involvement with Fleg Trading Ltd., the company registered in Panama for which President Macri was listed as director. Judge Sebastián Casanello was asked to start the file on the inquiry. The initial petition was made by Neuquén representative Darío Martínez. Martínez claims Macri could be guilty of perjury due to omissions in his sworn statement. Martínez also referenced another offshore company, Kagemusha SA (named after Akira Kurosawa's 1980 film), which was established in 1981 and to which President Macri also had connections.

=== Daniel Muñoz ===
Daniel Muñoz, the private secretary and confidant of former Argentinian president Néstor Kirchner later also served for two years as an aide to Néstor Kirchner's wife, Cristina Fernández de Kirchner, who was president of Argentina from 2007 to 2015. Muñoz and his wife were linked to Gold Black Limited, a company incorporated in the British Virgin Islands in 2010 to invest in US real estate. The origin of the company's funds was listed as "personal savings". From 2010 to the beginning of 2015, the company's ownership was through bearer shares, a financial instrument that can be used to hide an owner's identity. One of the directors, Sergio Tadisco, told ICIJ partner Canal Trece that he was just a figurehead who said he agreed to his name being used in 2011 because of his friendship with Muñoz and his wife. In January 2015, Muñoz and his wife became named shareholders, owning 50 percent each. By that time, Mossack Fonseca had become the registered agent of Gold Black. However, only three weeks later, its compliance department proposed resigning because Muñoz was identified in connection with the governments of the Kirchners. The resignation became effective in June 2015.

In 2009, Muñoz was investigated for illicit enrichment, a charge that was later dropped. In 2013, Argentinian media reported that Muñoz had helped transfer "bags of money" belonging to President Néstor Kirchner from Buenos Aires, the Argentine capital, to Santa Cruz, Kirchner's home state. Charges about the matter were dismissed in July 2015 for lack of evidence. On May 25, 2016, he died from cancer that he had for the last four years.

=== Lionel Messi ===
The family of Argentine Barcelona football player Lionel Messi said they would file a complaint after reports said Mossack Fonseca set a company up for him in 2012 named Mega Star Enterprises Inc. The family denied Messi had been involved and called the accusations slanderous. They said that the company referred to in the Panama Papers was inactive and that Messi had declared all income from image rights before and after proceedings with the Argentine Tax Agency. Messi alongside his father Jorge stood trial on three counts of tax evasion in May 2016. Spanish prosecutors say he tried to evade €4.1m in taxes on income from his image rights by assigning them to front companies in Belize and Uruguay. On 6 July 2016, Messi and his father were both found guilty of tax fraud and were handed suspended 21-month prison sentences, and respectively ordered to pay €1.7 million and €1.4 million in fines. However, by 2017, these were later reduced to €252,000 and €180,000 respectively, along with the removal of their sentences.

== Brazil ==
Five billionaires from Brazil, the sons of two Brazilian billionaires, and four former billionaire Brazilian families appear in the Panama Papers leak, according to Forbes. The Brazilian news website UOL has access to the leaked documents and has published an article and a list. Like many Panama Paper reports, their story cautions that some of the people mentioned in the documents may be doing nothing wrong: "In general there is nothing illegal per se in having an offshore company and in fact it is very common for an international business to set one up for transactions and joint ventures when they're doing business all over the world," said Brazil-based Marcello Hallake, a Brazil-based partner of the law firm Jones Day.

However, six out of ten members of Congress now face one criminal investigation or another. High-profile construction executives and a senator are among the 84 people arrested in the Petrobras scandal, a number that reflects the job protections in the 1988 Constitution for judges and prosecutors.

Three men (Marcel Herrmann Telles, Carlos Alberto Sicupira and Jorge Felipe Lemann, son of their long-time business partner Jorge Paulo Lemann, Brazil's richest man and a controlling shareholder of Anheuser-Busch InBev) set up three offshore companies in the British Virgin Islands and the Bahamas tied to private equity firm 3G and to beer firm AmBev, a unit of Anheuser-Busch Inbev, according to UOL. Two of the companies are no longer active and the men are no longer tied with the third. They told UOL the companies had been publicly disclosed and registered. Documents described Lemann as an advisor to Brazilian firm Sao Carlos. His father and father's business partners own a controlling stake.

The Panama Papers reveal that a former Supreme Court judge, Joaquim Barbosa, bought an apartment in downtown Miami.

Police raided the São Paulo offices of Mossack Fonseca in January 2016, seeking records about offshore companies the firm opened for two former executives of Petróleo Brasileiro S.A. (Petrobras) who were convicted in 2015 of corruption and money laundering. Police say the companies were used to hide illegally diverted funds.

=== Operation Car Wash ===
In January 2016, even before the Panama Papers were published, the Brazilian Federal Police, as part of a corruption investigation known as Operation Car Wash, had already accused Mossack Fonseca's law firm of helping suspects create offshore entities to hide corrupt money. They alleged that the firm used a real estate company to help hide criminal proceeds from the scheme involving Petrobras.

==== Impeachment ====
The leak complicated an already volatile political situation in Brazil, where a tanking economy had led to calls for the impeachment of President Dilma Rousseff amid many revelations of political corruption. As impeachment proceedings began, it became clear that the next two people in the order of succession have been implicated in the Petrobras scandal. According to O Estado de São Paulo, a company belonging to Eduardo Cunha, speaker of the lower house of the legislature and a leader of the impeachment drive, has surfaced in the Panama Papers. Rousseff herself is not mentioned in the papers.

Politicians from seven different political parties in Brazil were named as clients of Mossack Fonseca. Leaked files mention politicians from Brazil's largest party, the PMDB, which broke away from President Dilma Rousseff's coalition in 2016. Political figures from the PSDB, the most prominent opposition party in the country, were also mentioned in the leaks, as well as others from the PDT, PP, PSB, PSD and the PTB parties. No politicians from Rousseff's party were mentioned in the leaks.

=== FIFA bribes ===
A group of Dutch journalists from the daily newspaper Trouw found evidence in the Panama Papers showing that TV Globo is cited "many times" in a money laundering investigation of the De Nederlandsche Bank which revealed that for years the media outlet conducted "irregular financial transactions" through tax havens in order to pay for broadcast rights for the Copa Libertadores.

== Chile ==
The head of the Chilean branch of Transparency International, which campaigns against corporate secrecy, resigned when his name was linked to five firms in tax havens by the leaked documents.

== Colombia ==
The National Directorate of Taxes and Customs launched an investigation into all 850 clients of Mossack Fonseca Colombia, a subsidiary of Mossack Fonseca that was established in 2009. In 2014, Colombia had placed Panama onto its blacklist of tax havens. The leaked documents also led Panama to move forward with ongoing negotiations with Colombia on tax information-sharing.

== Ecuador ==
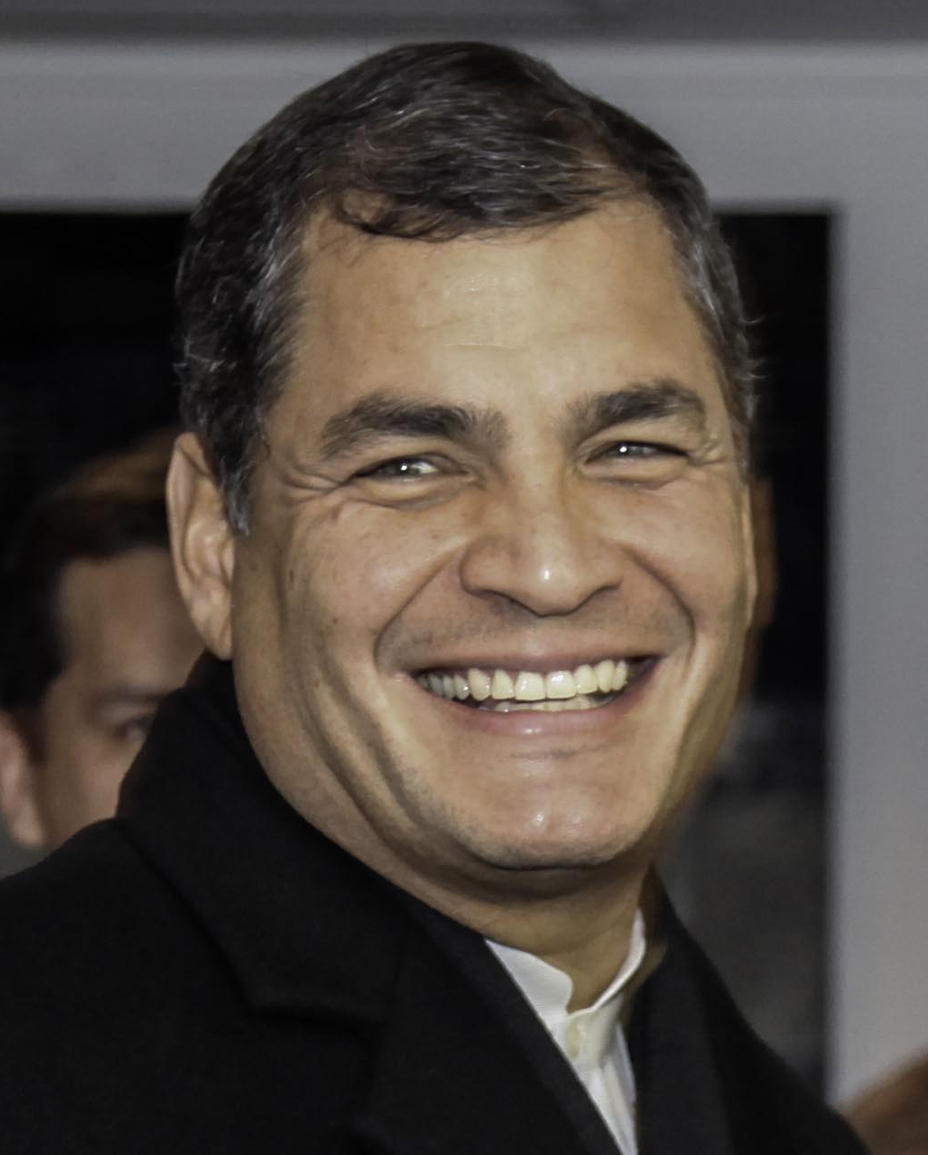
President Rafael Correa

Ecuadorian journalists have published the names of three current government officials, and the Panama Papers also reveal that in 2012 the Panamanian government believed that a Mossack Fonseca company the anti-corruption prosecutor was investigating for embezzlement, Orlion S.A., had been sold to president Rafael Correa Delgado and his brother Fabricio Correa in 2006. Mossack Fonseca had been asked for shareholder information but did not have it, and so contacted Legalsa & Asociados, a law firm in Guayaquil, Ecuador which had set up the offshore for a client. Shortly afterwards the firm dropped the offshore due to lack of information.

Correa's cousin, Pedro Delgado Campana, convicted in absentia in Ecuador for embezzlement, bought a home in North Miami Beach through a Mossack Fonseca company with his wife, who was Consul of Ecuador in Miami at the time.

Arturo Torres, investigative editor of El Comercio, told the Knight Center his newspaper published two stories connected to the Panama Papers:

- Grupo Ortega Trujillo offshore companies in Panama
- a Chinese company, with government contracts and ties to companies that operate in tax havens

He and the rest of the six journalists from Ecuador report they have received summonses and subpoenas from little-known anticorruption agency Council of Citizen Participation and Social Control (CPCCS), demanding all documents. A scheduled hearing was postponed due to the earthquake April 16. The National Assembly's Commission of Justice has also opened an investigation.

Mónica Almeida of El Universo said that the government has taken coverage of the Panama Papers as an attack on itself. Stories in the Ecuadorian media have mentioned attorney general Galo Chiriboga; Pedro Delgado Campaña, the former president of the Central Bank of Ecuador and Correa' cousin; and Javier Molina, a former adviser of the Ministry of Intelligence and one of the founders of Mossack Fonseca in Quito.

== Peru ==
Two supporters of leading candidate Keiko Fujimori have undeclared interests on Mossack Fonseca companies, according to ICIJ partner OjoPúblico, which said as well that three renowned chefs and Peru's largest timber company were also implicated.

Mario Vargas Llosa, who also has Spanish nationality, and his wife bought an offshore company through the buffer Mossack Fonseca. The couple appears linked to this from September 1, 2010, to October 6 of that year, shortly after Vargas Llosa won the Nobel Prize for Literature. After appearing linked, they denied using any tax havens.

== Uruguay ==
Five people were arrested on April 22, on suspicion of laundering funds for a Mexican drug cartel. A Uruguayan investigation had been underway, but authorities decided to move because of reports in an ICIJ partner, the weekly Búsqueda, that Gerardo González Valencia had used Mossack Fonseca companies to buy real estate in Uruguay. The head of the Los Cuinos cartel, his brother Abigael González Valencia, is now imprisoned in Mexico and the United States has designated him a drug kingpin, as well as his brother-in-law Nemesio Oseguera Cervantes, who leads the Jalisco New Generation Cartel (CJNG).

== Venezuela ==
Many of the boliburguesía, individuals who became wealthy under the Hugo Chávez and Nicolás Maduro administrations were included in the scandal.

Josmel Velásquez, brother of a security official under the late Hugo Chávez, was arrested April 15 trying to catch a flight out of the country due to an offshore company revealed by the Panama Papers. His mother Amelis Figueroa was also arrested, but allowed to return home due to her health. Venezuelan news site Armando.info reported that Josmel's brother Adrián, a former aide to late President Hugo Chávez, had opened a shell company though Mossack Fonseca in the Republic of the Seychelles with a $50,000 deposit. Their report was based on the documents leaked from Panamanian law firm Mossack Fonseca. Velásquez was Indicted April 20.

Franklin Durán, notorious in Venezuela and Argentina for his part in el maletinazo, or "suitcase scandal" involving an alleged illicit contribution from Venezuelan president Hugo Chávez to Cristina Fernández de Kirchner of $800,000 from the Venezuelan state-run oil company, PDVSA, was able to open a shell company from a jail cell in the United States, where he was serving a sentence for operating as an unregistered foreign agent.
