= Cottage Industries Exposition Limited =

Multinational company

- Type: Public
- Industry: Carpets and Handicrafts
- Founded: 1978
- Headquarters: Dubai, UAE
- Key people: Abdul Rashid Mir, Founder and CEO
- Website: CIE, Miraj Islamic Art Centre SAGA World Dubai, SAGA Departmental Stores

Cottage Industries Exposition Limited (CIE) is a multinational company that sells carpets, handicrafts and other heritage items from India and the Middle East.

Cottage Industries Exposition Ltd was established in 1980 as an export-trading house.

Alongside India, Cottage Industries Exposition has established emporia in Thailand, Mauritius, Indonesia, Cambodia, Africa, the Middle East, United Kingdom and the United States, providing an opportunity not only to view and share the Indian heritage from days gone by, but also provide an opportunity to purchase items such as carpets, Pashmina shawls, silk, gilded artifacts, reproductions of Islamic art and miniatures.

== Group Companies ==
- Cottage Industries Exposition Limited
- SAGA Department Stores Limited
- SAGA World Dubai
- Miraj Islamic Art Centre Dubai

== See also ==
- Max Group
- Libas
