= Waldo Wolff =

Argentine politician

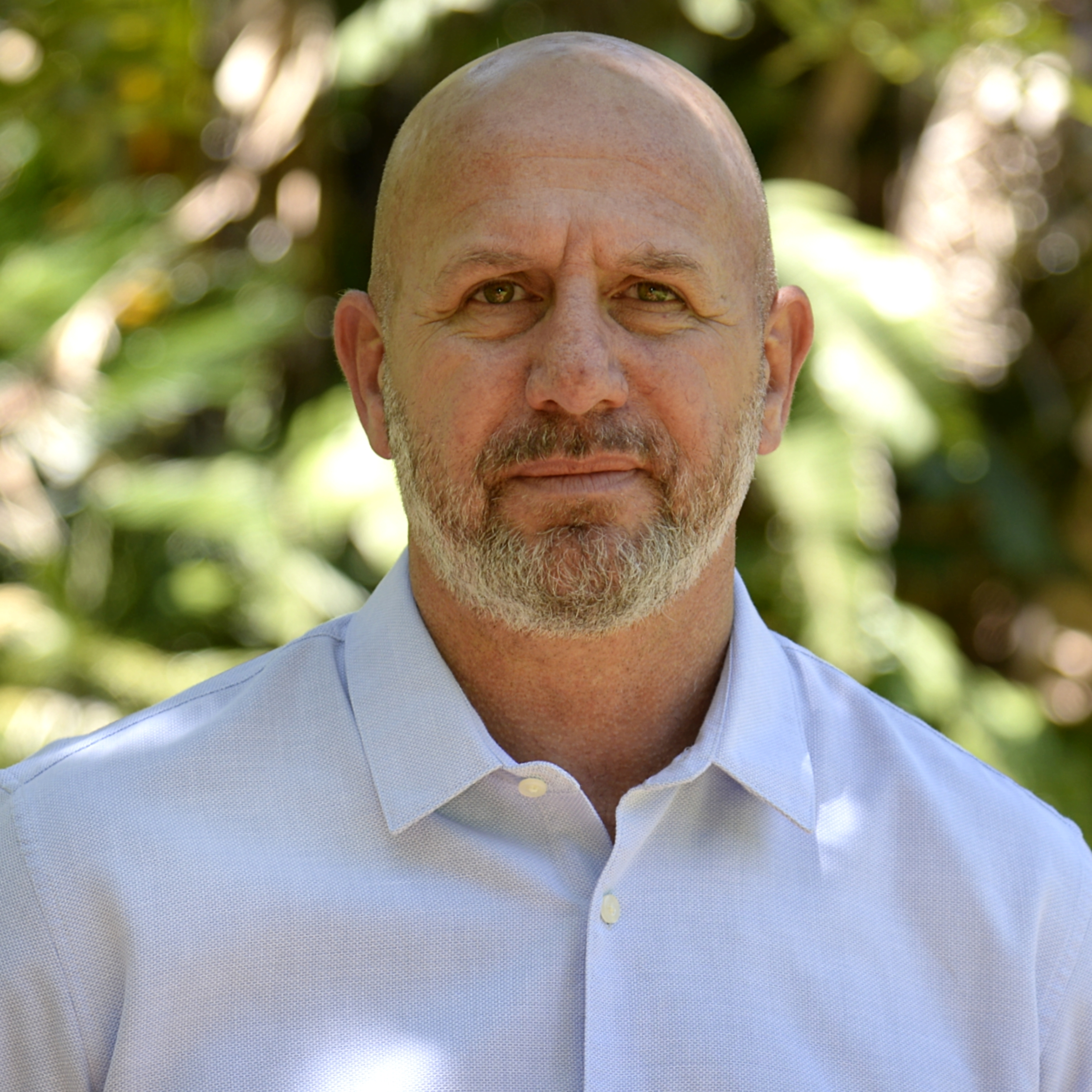

National Deputy
- In office 10 December 2015 – 27 December 2022
- Constituency: Buenos Aires

Personal details
- Born: 21 September 1968 (age 58) Buenos Aires, Argentina
- Party: Republican Proposal
- Education: University of Belgrano

Waldo Ezequiel Wolff (born 21 September 1968) is an Argentine politician who was a member of the Chamber of Deputies of Argentina from 2015 to 2022.

== Early life and career ==
Wolff was born on 21 September 1968. In his early years, he played professional football. At the University of Belgrano, he graduated with a degree in Business Administration and as a Public Auctioneer.

== Political career ==
Wolff was one of many politicians listed in the Panama Papers scandal.

Wolff was elected to the Argentine Chamber of Deputies in 2015 and re-elected in 2019. He had resigned in 27 December to work in the government of Buenos Aires.

== Electoral history ==
Electoral history of Waldo Wolff
Election	Office	List	#	District	Votes			Result	Ref.
Election	Office	List	#	District	Total	%	P.	Result	Ref.
2015	National Deputy	Cambiemos	11	Buenos Aires Province	3,037,552	33.75%	2nd (Note: Presented on an electoral list. The data shown represents the share of the vote the entire party/alliance received in that constituency.)	Elected	
2019	National Deputy	Juntos por el Cambio	5	Buenos Aires Province	3,668,580	37.77%	2nd	Elected	
2025	City Legislator	Buenos Aires First	6	City of Buenos Aires	261,595	15.92%	3rd	Not elected	
