= Jesús Villanueva =

Jesús Villanueva is a Venezuelan businessman who is a former director of Petróleos de Venezuela, S.A. He has been Vice President of PDVSA Finance Ltd. since 2005. He received international certification in 1999 as Internal Auditor by the Institute of Internal Auditors. He was recognized as a Certified Fraud Examiner in 2004. Villanueva has a BA in Public Accounting and a Master's in Hydrocarbon Economy and Management from the Central University of Venezuela in 1988.
