= Gérard Autajon =

French businessman

- Occupation: Businessman

Gérard Autajon is a French businessman. He is the chief executive officer of Autajon C.S., a Montélimar-based packaging company founded by his father in 1964. His name appeared in the Panama Papers in April 2016.

== Biography ==
Gérard Autajon was born on May 1, 1953.

Since 1992, he has been the discreet CEO of the Autajon family group, founded in 1964 by his parents Alain and Suzanne, and headquartered in Montélimar in the Drôme region of France. Specializing in packaging, the group went international under Gérard Autajon's impetus and had 4,000 employees in 2016.

In 2004, he and his family were included in the 500 plus grandes fortunes de France list (compiled by Challenges magazine).

His name came up in 2016 (he was then France's 401st richest man) in the Panama Papers scandal: documents from Mossack Fonseca showed that he had a Swiss bank account holding 25 million Swiss francs (around €22 million), concealed from the French tax authorities; when banking in Switzerland was relaxed in 2013, he successively moved this money to several shell companies in tax havens (Hong Kong, the Bahamas, the Netherlands Antilles and Luxembourg), at the same time as closing a plant for economic reasons – as reported in the television program Cash Investigation.

After being the target of a tax audit before 2016, he was investigated by the National Financial Prosecutor's Office (Parquet national financier) and sentenced in 2017 to a one-year suspended prison sentence and a €2 million fine as part of a procedure of prior recognition of guilt, in addition to a tax reassessment.
