= Abdul Rashid Mir =

Indian businessman (born 1940)

- Born: August 1940 (age 85)
- Occupation: Businessman
- Known for: Founder & CEO of Cottage Industries Exposition Limited

Abdul Rashid Mir (born August 1940) is a Kashmiri businessman, founder & CEO of Cottage Industries Exposition Limited (CIE).

Mir has been named in connection with the Panama Papers.
