= Libas =

Indian fashion brand

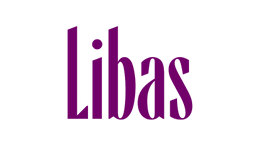
- Type: Private
- Industry: Fashion, Retail
- Founded: 1985; 41 years ago
- Founder: Sunil Keshwani
- Headquarters: Noida, India
- Key people: Sidhant Keshwani (CEO); Sunil Keshwani
- Products: Ethnic wear, fusion wear
- Owner: Zivore Apparel Pvt Ltd
- Number of employees: 1,500
- Website: www.libas.in

Libas is an Indian fashion brand specializing in ethnic and fusion wear for women. The brand was founded in 1985 by Sunil Keshwani. It is led by Sidhant Keshwani, who is the CEO. It operates in India under the parent company Zivore Apparel Pvt Ltd.

== History ==
Libas was established in 1985 by Sunil Keshwani. In 2013, his son Sidhant Keshwani assumed the role of CEO and expanded the brand's digital presence. The company launched on e-commerce platforms Myntra and Flipkart in 2014. By 2019, Libas became a fast-fashion D2C (Direct-to-Consumer) company in the Indian wear segment with the launch of its official website. In 2020, Libas introduced its mobile shopping app for browsing, selecting, and purchasing Indian wear and launched the sub-brand Libas Extra Love, which focuses on plus-size apparel.Libas expanded its horizons and went global with the launch of ShopLibas. This marked a significant step in taking Indian wear to international customers, across the world.

The brand entered the offline retail sector in 2021 with the opening of its first standalone store and expanded into multi-brand outlets (MBOs). In 2022, Libas introduced the Libas Art sub-brand, a premium line of occasion wear that includes hand-embroidered garments and pieces created using artisanal techniques. By 2023, Libas expanded its retail operations into large-format stores (LFS) and became a mass brand with products ranging from Rs 1000 to 8000, providing wardrobe options for all seasons and occasions. In 2024, the brand entered into the kid’s ethnic wear market by launching Libas Kids, a line of ethnic wear for girls aged 3 to 12 that includes kurta sets, lehenga sets, sharara sets and Anarkali suits in various prints and colours. The brand also expanded its presence on Amazon Fashion, TataCliq, and Nykaa Fashion.In 2026, Libas launched its new workwear brand – Gerua – using AI-led insights to meet the needs of the modern working women.

== Overview ==
Libas is focused on ethnic and fusion wear, including kurtas, kurta sets, suits, sarees, and contemporary styles. The brand operates through an omnichannel strategy, combining online marketplaces, direct-to-consumer platforms, and offline retail stores. Libas delivers over 4,000 live SKUs and launches 100-150 new styles weekly.

The company exports its products to several international markets, including the USA, UK, UAE, and Australia and has collaborated with Bollywood celebrities for brand campaigns, including Kiara Advani, Sanjeeda Sheikh, Vaani Kapoor, and Avneet Kaur were featured in marketing campaigns. In 2022, actress Sara Ali Khan became the brand ambassador.

== Operations ==
Libas is headquartered in Noida, India. It operates more than 40 exclusive brand outlets (EBOs) and has a presence in over 500 large-format stores and multi-brand outlets across the country. The company employs approximately 1,500 individuals. In May 2024, Libas secured its first external funding of INR 150 crore from IAF Series 5, managed by ICICI Venture. Libas has received several industry awards, including a Platinum Green Building rating from the Indian Green Building Council (IGBC). The company won the Best Customer Engagement Strategy Award in Fashion Services by Quantic.
