= Abdeslam Bouchouareb =

Algerian politician

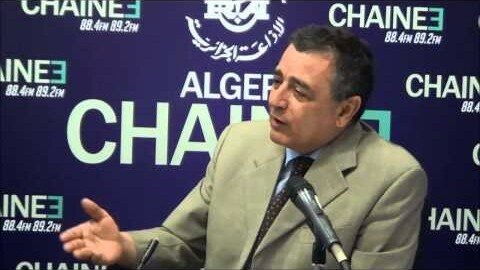
- Abdeslam Bouchouareb on July 30, 2015 at the Alger Chaîne 3

Minister of Industry and Mines
- In office 2014–2017

Abdeslam Bouchouareb (born 3 June 1952) is an Algerian politician who had serverd as a Minister of Industry and Mines of Algeria.

== Political career ==
Bouchouareb started his political career in 1994. He served in several different ministerial positions, Minister of Industry from 1996, Minister of Employment from 2000, and vice president of the National Assembly starting in 2012.

== Panama Papers ==
He was named in the 2016 Panama Papers leak. Bouchouareb was the sole owner of Royal Arrival Corp. through which he held a Swiss bank account at NBAD Private Bank SA. The management of the company was executed through a Luxembourg company called Compagnie d'Etude et de Conseil. The Swiss bank account held approximately 700,000 euros which was illegal under Algerian law.

On 1 July 2020, Bouchouareb was sentenced to 20 years in prison on corruption charges.

In March 2025, the French courts refused to extradite Abdeslam Bouchouareb to Algeria, believing that an extradition could have "exceptionally serious consequences" due to his health and age.
