= Jacob Engel =

Israeli businessman

- יעקב אנגל
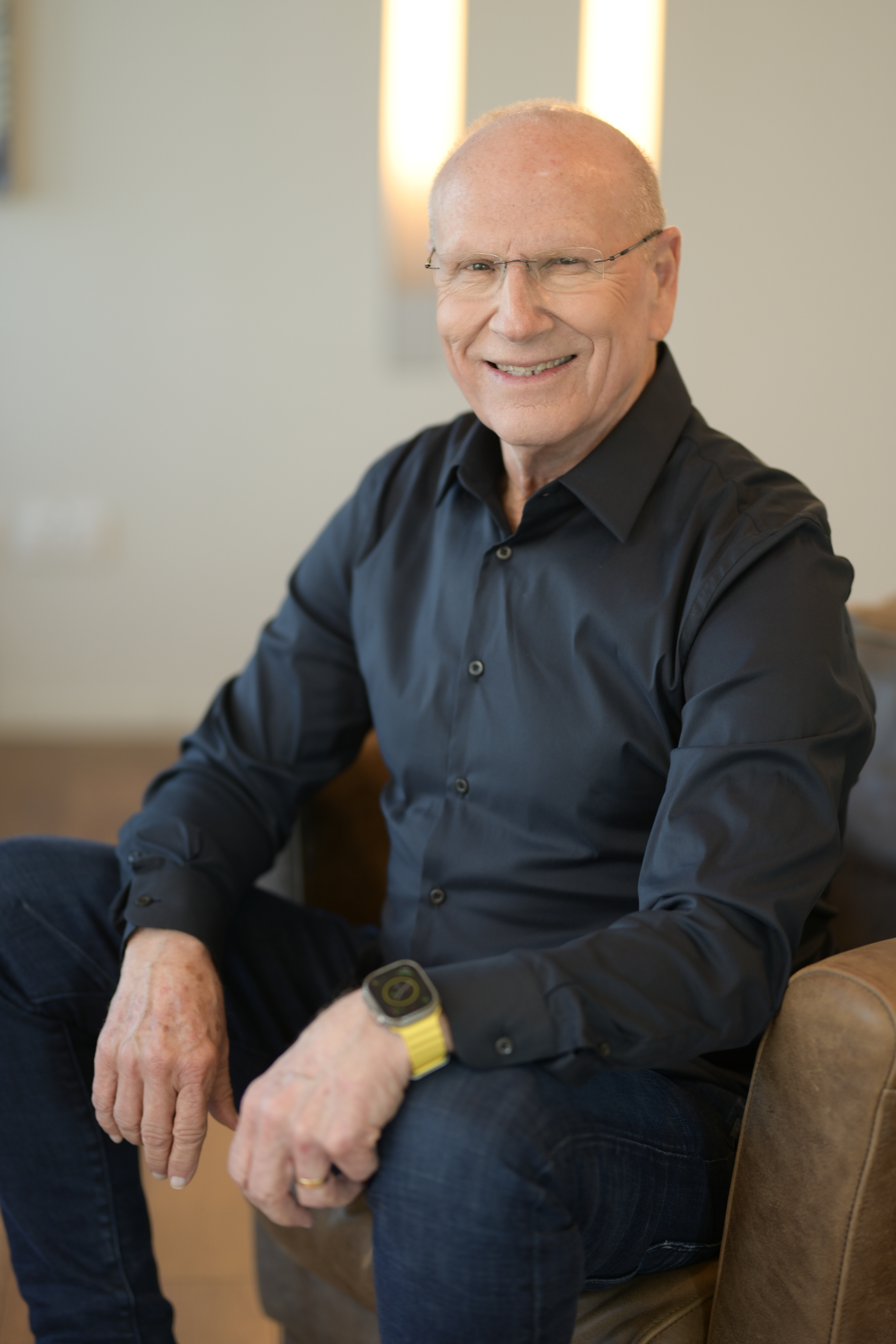
- Jacob Engel
- Born: Zagreb, Croatia
- Education: BSc in Mechanical Engineering; Technion – Israel Institute of Technology
- Occupation: Businessman
- Known for: Chairman of Engelinvest Group
- Children: 4

Jacob Engel (Hebrew: יעקב אנגל) is an Israeli billionaire primarily involved in the real estate, infrastructure, technology, and mining fields. He is the chairman of Engelinvest Group.

== Biography ==
Engel was born in Zagreb, Croatia. At the age of two, he immigrated to Israel with his family. They initially lived in Ma'abara at Kfar Hasidim and moved to Krayot near Haifa. He earned a BSc in Mechanical Engineering from the Technion – Israel Institute of Technology. His first business venture was Dalton, a company that developed security doors and Intercom; after a few years, he sold the company, and Engel became a property developer. During the 1990s post-Soviet aliyah, he built tens of thousands of apartments for the new immigrants in billions of shekels. In 1991, he listed his company on the Tel Aviv Stock Exchange under the name Lagna Resources; in 1997, it was registered at the Nasdaq, New York. in 2005, it was registered as an IPO at the London AIM Stock market. His next initiative was property development in Eastern Europe; he constructed and sold tens of thousands of residential units in Bulgaria, the Czech Republic, Hungary, Poland, Romania, and Serbia. In 2007, he sold the Lagna company to Azorim for NIS 430 million.

In 2007, Engel founded the Engelinvest group focused on real estate opportunities and investments and began investing in real estate in the United Kingdom with Hezi Hermoni, creating a portfolio valued in hundreds of millions of pounds and also established Engelinvest Renewal, which develops residential projects mainly in central Israel. The company has a portfolio of projects with thousands of residential units. In 2021 and 2022, it was joined by Bank Leumi and Shamrock Holdings. in 2007, Engel founded Elenilto Group, which is involved in the mining sector. 2008, the company acquired 75 percent of Tanzania’s copper mines and 72 of its gold and copper mine franchises. The company also had chromium, copper, iron, gold, and zinc mining licenses for over 9,000 square kilometers in Albania, Congo, Ghana, Ethiopia, Israel, Liberia, and Tanzania. It operated gravel and sand quarries in Eastern Europe and the south and center of Israel. In 2010, Elenilto won one of the world’s most significant iron ore mining tenders in Liberia. In 2011, the company sold it. In 2015, Engel established Tenlot, a company that acts as a technology platform for gaming and lottery activity. It has government licenses and operates in Latin America and Africa. In 2020, White Sands Industries, a subsidiary of Elenilto Group, won an Israel Land Authority tender to operate the Hanaton quarry for 20 years, it will pay $570 Million. Engel, the leading investor in Atooro Fund, invests in technology and start-up companies.

== Personal life ==
Jacob Engel is married, is a father to four children, and lives in Ramat HaSharon.
