= Pedro Delgado Campaña =

Ecuadorian economist (born 1962)

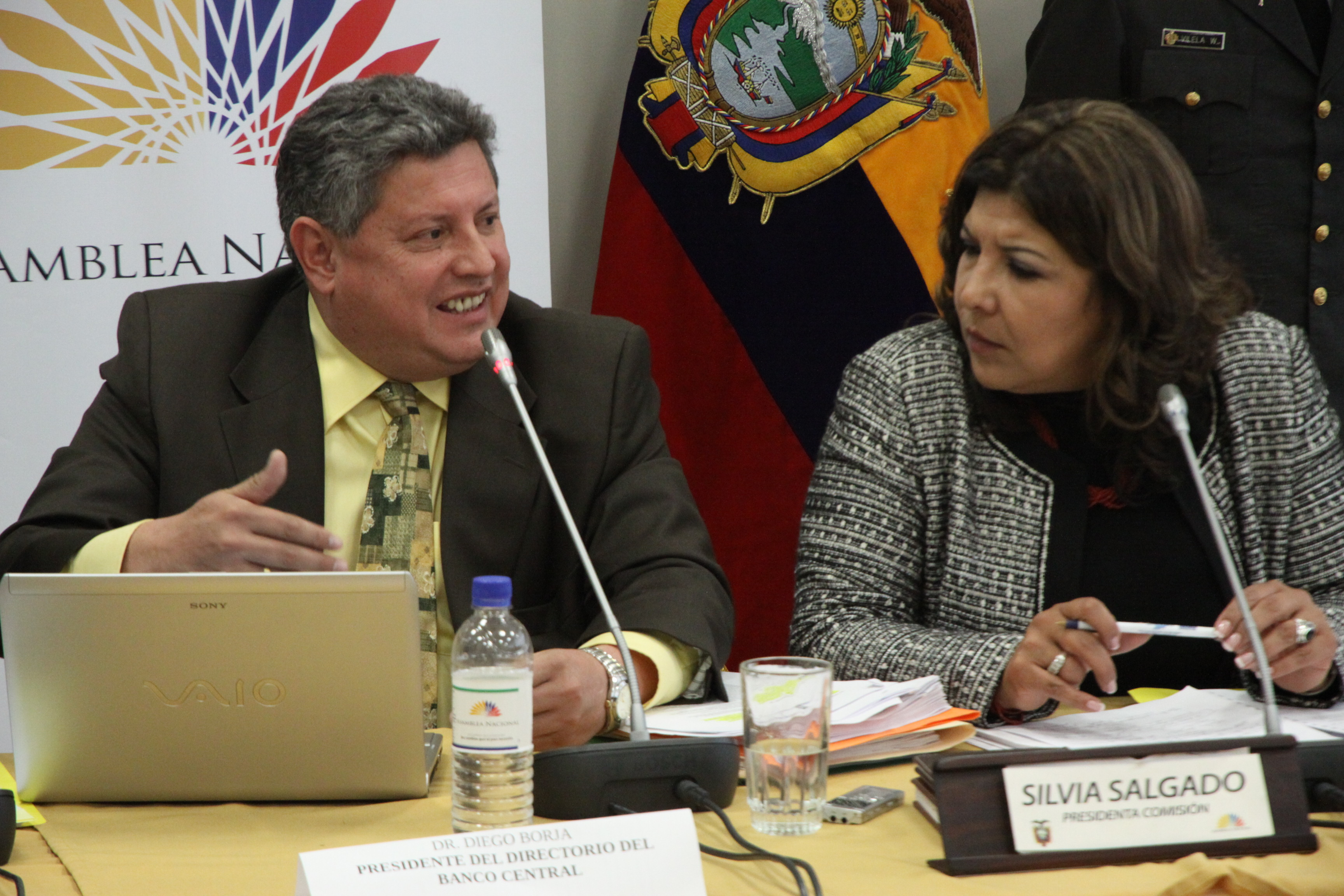
- Campaña (left) in 2011
- Known for: Governor of the Central Bank of Ecuador (2011-12)
- Relatives: Rafael Correa (cousin)

Pedro Delgado Campaña (born November 10, 1962), a prominent figure in Ecuadorian politics and finance, served as the President of the Central Bank of Ecuador from November 10, 2011, to December 19, 2012. He is also known for his familial connection to former Ecuadorian President Rafael Correa, being his second cousin.

Delgado held several important positions in Ecuador's financial sector, including Risk Manager at the National Financial Corporation (CFN) during the governments of Abdalá Bucaram and Jamil Mahuad. Also, Delgado has served as National Superintendent of Financial Institutions. Additionally, he has been involved in projects with international organizations such as the Inter-American Development Bank (IDB), World Bank (WB), and International Monetary Fund (IMF).

Delgado's tenure at the Central Bank came to an abrupt end in December 2012 when he resigned after admitting to falsifying his economics degree from the Pontifical Catholic University of Ecuador. This scandal not only led to his resignation but also resulted in the revocation of his master's degree in administration from INCAE Business School.

Following his resignation, Delgado's legal troubles escalated. In 2015, he was sentenced in absentia to eight years in prison for embezzlement of public funds. This conviction stemmed from an illicit loan of $800,000 granted to Argentine businessman Gastón Duzac in 2011, during Correa's presidency. Additionally, in 2019, Ecuador's National Court of Justice sentenced Delgado to five years in prison for illicit association and ordered him to repay approximately $788,000.

After fleeing Ecuador in 2012, Delgado became a fugitive from Ecuadorian justice. His time as a fugitive ended on August 27, 2021, when he was arrested by U.S. Immigration and Customs Enforcement (ICE) officials in Miami, Florida, for allegedly violating U.S. immigration laws.
