= Soulieman Marouf =

British businessman (born 1972)

Soulieman Marouf (born August 1972 ) is a British businessman.

Marouf is a friend of the Syrian President, Bashar al-Assad, and has been called his "London fixer". In October 2012, his assets were frozen, and he was banned from travelling in European Union member states. He was the first UK resident to be subjected to EU sanctions against Syria. This ban was lifted in May 2014.

His 2016 holdings included several luxury flats in London, valued at approximately £6m.

He lives in St John's Wood, London, with his wife and children.
