= Tarek Aggad =

Saudi businessman

- طارق عقاد
- Born: Tarek Omar Abdul Fattah Aggad; 1971 (age 54–55); Lebanon
- Education: Harvard University
- Occupations: Chairman, Arab Palestinian Investment Company
- Spouse: Shirine Aggad
- Children: 4
- Father: Omar Aggad

Tarek Omar Abdul Fattah Aggad (Arabic: طارق عمر عبد الفتاح عقاد, romanized: Ṭāriq ʿUmar ʿAbd al-Fattāḥ ʿAqqād; born 1971) is a Saudi businessman. He is the executive director of the Aggad Investment Company (AICO) and chairman of Arab Palestinian Investment Company, two firms founded by his father, Omar Aggad.

== Biography ==
Aggad was born in Lebanon in 1971, the son of Omar Aggad, and grew up in Riyadh, Saudi Arabia, where he attended local schools. He holds a bachelor's degree in economics from Harvard University, U.S.

Aggad was a director on a number of boards including Aggad Investment Company, Palestine Power Generation Company, Palestine Electric Company, Bank of Palestine, King Hussein Cancer Foundation, King's Academy as well as other companies in Palestine, Jordan, and Saudi Arabia.

In 2019، Aggad was awarded the "Star of Merit" of the Order of the State of Palestine from President Mahmoud Abbas of Palestine.

In 2023, Aggad was awarded an honorary doctorate in humanities from Birzeit University.

== Personal life ==
He is married to Shirine Aggad, and they have four children.
