= Alfonso de Angoitia =

Mexican businessperson

- Born: Alfonso de Angoitia Noriega; January 17, 1962 (age 64); Mexico City, Mexico
- Occupations: Co-CEO of Grupo Televisa; Co-CEO of TelevisaUnivision Mexico
- Website: www.alfonsodeangoitia.com

Alfonso de Angoitia Noriega is co-CEO of Grupo Televisa, one of the main cable TV operators in Mexico (Izzi Telecom), the leading satellite pay television system in the country (Sky México), and the leading media company in the Spanish-speaking world.

== Board memberships ==
Angoitia has been on the Board of Televisa and Member of the Executive Committee since April 1997. Mr. de Angoitia is a member of the Board of Directors of various companies including Univision, Grupo Financiero Banorte, Fomento Economico Mexicano (FEMSA), and Liberty Latin America.

== Career ==
Before taking over as co-CEO, Angoitia was Executive VP (2003-2017) and was Chief Financial Officer (1999-2003) . Prior to joining Grupo Televisa, S.A., he worked at White & Case LLP in New York City, and then co-founded Mijares, Angoitia, Cortés y Fuentes, S.C., one of Mexico's leading law firms. Angoitia was the personal attorney of Emilio Azcárraga, the current Chairman of Grupo Televisa; after the death of Azcárraga's father, Emilio Azcárraga Milmo, Angoitia worked together with Emilio Azcárraga to financially and legally restructure the company and regain operating control.

Mr. Angoitia is considered Televisa's financial strategist and a key ally of owner Emilio Azcárraga Jean. He played a key role in negotiating a $1.2 billion deal between Univision and Televisa, which expanded Televisa’s access to US Hispanic market.

Mr. de Angoitia's vision has been key to the Company's diversification, strategic positioning, profitability, and financial strength. As co-CEO, he has the shared responsibility of leading the transformation and repositioning of the Company's content business.

Alfonso de Angoitia is a regular annual attendee of the Allen & Company Sun Valley Conference media summit in Idaho, an annual conference hosted by private investment firm Allen & Company which typically features business, political, philanthropic and cultural heavyweights.

== Philanthropy ==
Mr. de Angoitia is Chairman of the Board of Trustees of Fundación Kardias, a Mexican non-for profit organization dedicated to improving the quality of care for children who suffer from congenital heart defects. In addition, Mr. de Angoitia is a member of the Board of the Mexican Foundation for Health and of the UNAM Foundation, and a member of the Board of Trustees of the Paley Center for Media.

== External Pages ==
- Televisa, Univision Deal Ushers in New Era
- Televisa chiefs quit Univision
- Televisa to Take Stake in Univision
