= Kjell G. Finstad =

Norwegian businessman and convicted fraudster

Kjell Gunnar Finstad
- Born: 4 October 1939 (age 87)
- Known for: Fraud
- Convictions: Multiple counts of fraud, including securities and accounting fraud

Kjell Gunnar Finstad (born 4 October 1939) is a Norwegian businessman and a convicted fraudster.

Finstad is educated as a geologist and started his career in the petroleum industry. He has also been involved in real estate speculation in Norway. He became known when his investment company Norex went bankrupt with 820 million NOK in debts. The case was major news in Norway for several years. The bankruptcy was described as one of the largest in Norwegian history.

In 2010 he was convicted on multiple counts of fraud, including securities and accounting fraud, in connection with the bankruptcy. The case also led to an investigation of Ernst & Young over their accounting practices. Finstad formerly owned the Ekeberg restaurant in Oslo. In 2016 Norway's largest newspaper Aftenposten and The New York Times highlighted Finstad's use of offshore corporations in connection with the Panama Papers controversy.
