= Emmanuel Ndahiro =

Rwandan soldier

- Military career
- Allegiance: Rwanda
- Commands: Intelligence agency of Rwanda

Emmanuel Ndahiro is a Rwandan soldier. He was the chief of the intelligence agency of Rwanda until 2011.
