= Omar Aggad =

Saudi Palestinian businessman

- Born: Omar A. Aggad; 20 April 1927; Jaffa, Mandatory Palestine
- Died: 1 February 2018 (aged 90); Canada
- Education: University of Manchester
- Occupation: Businessman
- Known for: Founder of Arab Palestinian Investment Company and Aggad Investment Company (AICO)
- Spouse: Malak Aggad
- Children: 3, including Tarek Aggad

Omar A. Aggad (sometimes Umar Aqqad; Arabic: عمر العقاد, romanized: ʿUmar al-ʿAqqād; 20 April 1927 – 1 February 2018) was a Saudi-Palestinian businessman, the founder of Aggad Investment Company (AICO), and the founder and former chairman of Arab Palestinian Investment Company (APIC).

== Early life ==
Aggad was born in Jaffa, Mandatory Palestine, in 1927, and attended Alrashidieh College in Jerusalem. He subsequently received a scholarship to attend the University of Manchester in the UK where he graduated with degrees in electrical and mechanical engineering.

== Career ==
After working for a few years in the UK, he moved to Saudi Arabia in 1950 where he joined the Juffali Group as a senior manager. In 1975, he ventured out on his own and created what would become one of the leading investment groups in Saudi Arabia. He established over 40 industrial and trade ventures in Saudi Arabia, most of which still exist.

He was the founder of Aggad Investment Company (AICO) in 1975, and the founder and former chairman of the Arab Palestinian Investment Company (APIC). He led a group of investors to purchase 25% of Smith Barney in 1982, and served on its board of directors.

The Wall Street Journal noted that "Aggad is considered one of Saudi Arabia's most savviest and professional managers. In a book about Arabian merchants, British writer Michael Fields called him "bold and impulsive, an intuitive decision-taker with a huge head for detail." As a partner with other Saudi and foreign investors, Aggad operated 23 manufacturing plants scattered across Saudi Arabia."

He was a founding shareholder and director of InvestCorp Bank and a founding director of the Saudi British Bank while serving on the board of directors for 20 years.

After the Oslo process, and having been historically supportive of Palestine, Aggad decided to create an entity to invest and create jobs in his historic homeland, and thus he founded the Arab Palestinian Investment Company (APIC).

Since its founding, APIC has become one of the largest operators in Palestine, employing over 3000 people. Subsidiaries of APIC offer a wide array of products and services through distribution rights agreements with multinational companies that include Philip Morris, Procter & Gamble, Kellogg's, Hyundai, Chrysler, Dodge, Jeep, Alfa Romeo, Fiat, Fiat Professional, XL Energy, Abbott, B. Braun, Eli Lilly, GlaxoSmithKline, Sanofi Aventis and Nivea, among many others.

APIC was registered in the British Virgin Islands in September 1994. In 1996, it was registered with Palestine's Ministry of National Economy as a foreign private shareholding company, and became into a foreign public shareholding company in 2013. In March 2014, APIC shares were listed on the Palestine Exchange (PEX: APIC). Its authorized capital is US$125 million, and its paid-up capital is US$112 million as of December 2022.

Aggad was a philanthropist, and the school of engineering at Birzeit University is named after him, and he served as an honorary trustee of the university. He was an honorary trustee of the Institute of Palestine Studies and other not-for-profits in Saudi Arabia and elsewhere in the Arab world.

== Personal life and death ==
Omar Aggad was married to Malak Aggad, and they had 4 children, Rana, Talal, Lama, and Tarek. Talal Aggad manages the family holding company (AICO), and Tarek Aggad is CEO of APIC.

He died on 1 February 2018 at the age of 90.

== Awards and merits ==
In 2018, Omar Aggad was posthumously decorated with the "Great star of Merit" of the Order of Jerusalem by President Mahmoud Abbas of Palestine in recognition of his philanthropy, pioneering role, and outstanding national commitment, and as an appreciation for his honorable lifetime struggle in defending his homeland Palestine, the Palestinian people, and the Palestinian just cause. The Award described Omar Aggad's passing as a "great national loss". Aggad's son Tarek received the Merit from President Abbas on his late father's behalf.
