= Arab Palestinian Investment Company =

Palestinian-Jordanian company

- Company type: Public
- Industry: Holding company
- Founded: September 1994
- Headquarters: Amman, Jordan
- Area served: Palestine, Jordan, Saudi Arabia
- Key people: Tarek Aggad (Chairman and CEO); Omar Aggad (founder)

Arab Palestinian Investment Company is a Palestinian–Jordanian company headquartered in Ramallah, Palestine. It was founded in September 1994 by several Arab businessmen to channel investment into Palestine. Since its founding, APIC has become one of the largest operators in Palestine, employing over 3000 employees. Subsidiaries of APIC offer a wide array of products and services through distribution rights agreements with multinational companies that include Philip Morris, Procter & Gamble, Kellogg's, Hyundai, Chrysler, Dodge, Jeep, Alfa Romeo, Fiat, Fiat Professional, XL Energy, Abbott, B. Braun, Eli Lilly, GlaxoSmithKline, Sanofi Aventis and Nivea, among many others. APIC is located in Amman, Jordan and Ramallah, Palestine.

APIC was registered in the British Virgin Islands in September 1994. In 1996, it was registered with Palestine's Ministry of National Economy as a foreign private shareholding company, and became into a foreign public shareholding company in 2013. In March 2014, APIC shares were listed on the Palestine Exchange (PEX: APIC). Its authorized capital is US$125 million, and its paid-up capital is US$112 million as of December 2022.

As an investment holding company, APIC's investments are diverse, spanning across the manufacturing, trade, distribution and service sectors, with a presence in Palestine, Jordan, Saudi Arabia and the United Arab Emirates through its nine subsidiaries, which include National Aluminum and Profiles Company (NAPCO); Siniora Food Industries Company; Unipal General Trading Company; Palestine Automobile Company; Medical Supplies and Services Company; Sky Advertising and Promotion Company; Arab Leasing Company; and the Arab Palestinian Storage and Cooling Company..
