= Panama Papers and Africa =

Countries with politicians, public officials or close associates implicated in the leak on April 15, 2016 (As of May 19, 2016)

The Panama Papers are 11.5 million leaked documents that detail financial and attorney–client information for more than 214,488 offshore entities. The documents, some dating back to the 1970s, were created by, and taken from, Panamanian law firm and corporate service provider Mossack Fonseca, and were leaked in 2015 by an anonymous source.

This page details related allegations, reactions, and investigations, in Africa.

Former South African president Thabo Mbeki, head of the African Union's panel on illicit financial flows, on April 9 called the leak "most welcome" and called on African nations to investigate the citizens of their nations who appear in the papers. His panel's 2015 report found that Africa loses $50 billion a year due to tax evasion and other illicit practices and its 50-year losses top a trillion dollars. Furthermore, he said, the Seychelles, an African nation, is the fourth most mentioned tax haven in the documents.

== Algeria ==
Minister of Industry and Mines Abdeslam Bouchouareb has been sole owner of a Panamanian-registered offshore company known as Royal Arrival Corp since 2015. The company, active in Turkey, Great Britain and Algeria, is managed through Compagnie d'Etude et de Conseil (CEC), based in Luxembourg, and has an account in the Swiss NBAD Private Bank. CEC confirmed the ownership of Royal Arrival and said it managed the minister's inherited assets with transparency.

Algeria estimates it has lost 16 billion dollars offshore between 2004 and 2014, a cause for concern given the drop in the price of oil, which accounts for 95% of Algeria's external revenue.

== Angola ==
The Panama Papers exposed a link between an American oil company's oil concessions and several powerful politicians in Angola. According to the leaked documents approximately fifteen shell companies funneled money through UBS bank accounts to elites in Portugal with direct ties to Helder Bataglia dos Santos of Escom, which describes itself as one of the largest investors in Angola and the Democratic Republic of Congo. The account of one company, Markwell Inc, received and sent on over $12 million in 2008 and 2009.

Petroleum Minister José Maria Botelho de Vasconcelos had power of attorney for an offshore company in 2002, when he became petroleum minister after previously being employed for a number of years as an executive at Sonangol, according to the leaked documents. He denies wrongdoing. ICIJ partner Le Monde says it has seen documents that show he was the proxyholder for Medea Investments Limited, founded in Niue in 2001, and moved to Samoa five years later. The company, which issued only bearer bonds, had a capitalization of $1 million, and closed in 2009. He has never previously been accused of corruption.

Angola's $5 billion sovereign wealth fund, the Fundo Soberano de Angola (FSDEA), promotes itself as a vehicle of development and prosperity for Angola. The FSDEA is headed by José Filomeno de Sousa "Zenu" dos Santos, the son of President José Eduardo dos Santos, who has been in power since 1979. Funded by the state-owned petroleum company Sonangol, the FSDEA has critics who say that its record-keeping is murky and that it seems to engage in nepotism and cronyism.

== Botswana ==
Ian Kirby, head of the Court of Appeal, owns seven holding companies in the British Virgin Islands. He has said they were intended for investment, and lost money.

== Republic of the Congo ==
In 2015, Congo produced 290,000 barrels of oil a day. Philia's attorney denied receiving advantageous pricing and said it only received 2.5% of Coraf oil.

=== Sassou-Nguesso ===
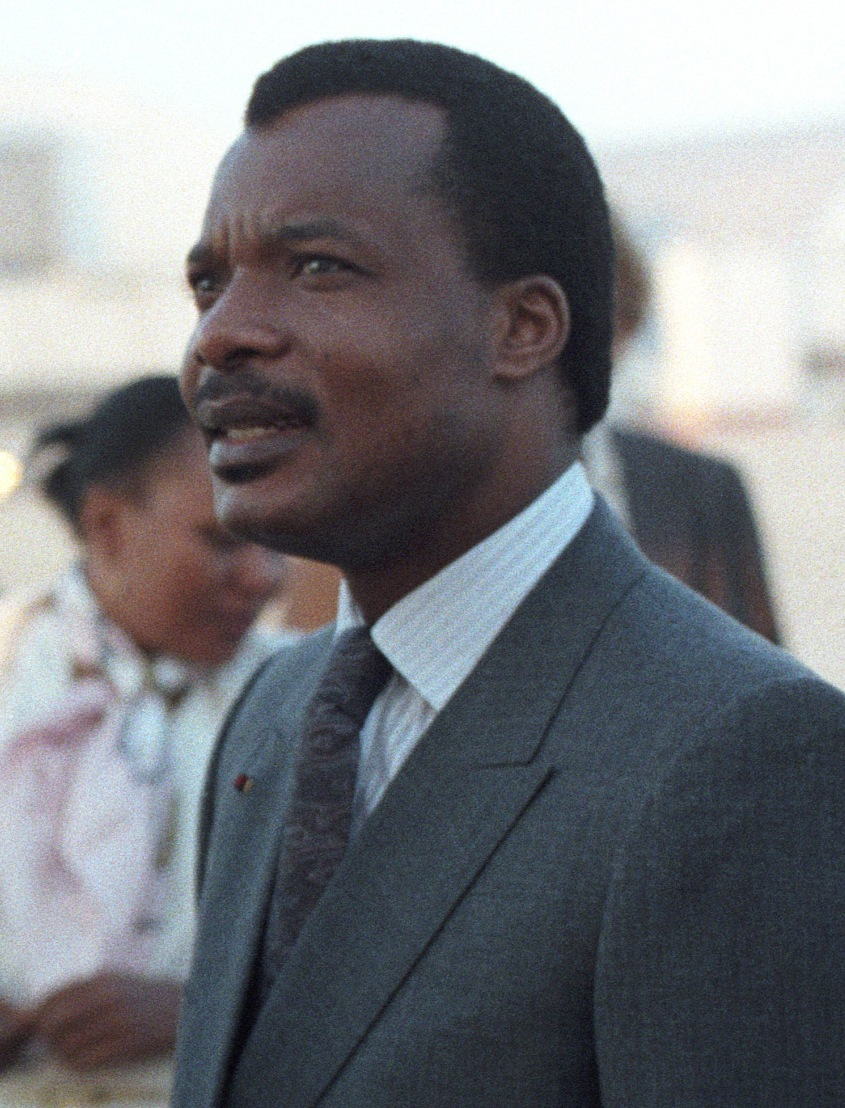
Denis Sassou Nguesso, President of Congo-Brazzaville

Denis Christel Sassou-Nguesso is the son of Denis Sassou Nguesso, in power for 32 years and re-elected in March in a disputed election. Daniel is a representative for Oyo, a member of the ruling Parti congolais du travail or Congolese Party of Labour. He is also the assistant director-general of the Société nationale des pétroles du Congo (SNPC), and general manager of the national refinery, Coraf. According to leaked documents he had Mossack Fonseca establish a shell company in the British Virgin Islands for him named Phoenix Best Finance Ltd.

His name also appears in 2002 as a director of Geneva-based Philia SA alongside oil merchant Jean-Philippe Amvame Ndong. He has denied all knowledge of any of these matters.

According to Swiss non-profit Berne Declaration, Philia has an exclusive no-bid contract for Congolese oil exports from the Coraf refinery, and for the last three years the country has not received any payment at all for oil shipped to the refinery.

=== Bruno Itoua ===
Bruno Itoua was the president's advisor on oil and director-general of the SNPC until 2005. A US federal court found that he diverted funds to fictitious companies, but he nonetheless became minister of energy. Panama Papers documents seen by Le Monde reveal he has also held the power of attorney since 2004 for Denvest Capital Strategies and Grafin Associated SA, registered by Mossack Fonseca in Panama and the British Virgin Islands. Itoua is currently minister for scientific research.

== Democratic Republic of Congo ==
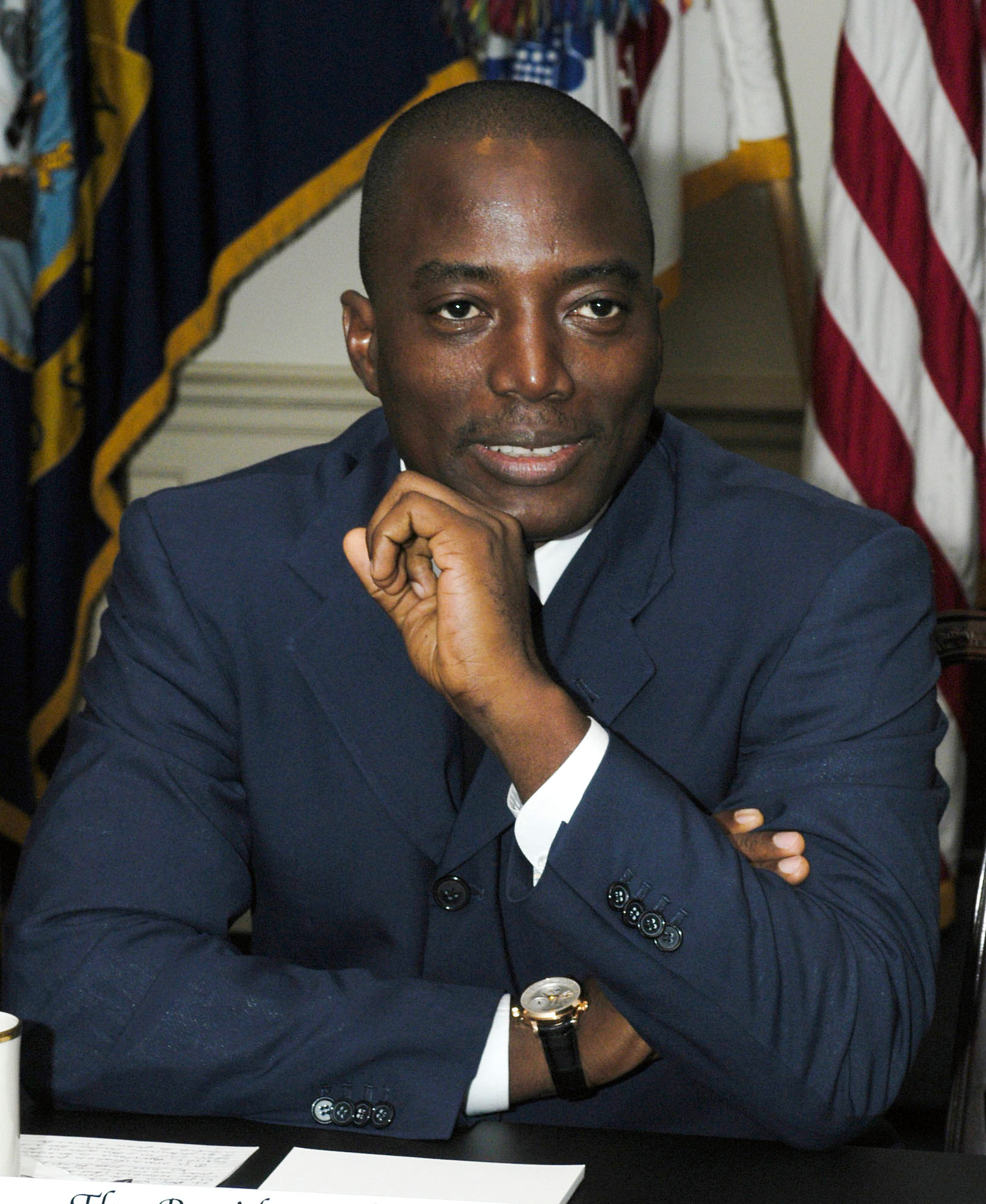
Laurent-Désiré Kabila's son and successor, Joseph Kabila

From 1999 to 2002, the Kabila regime "transferred ownership of at least $5 billion of assets from the state-mining sector to private companies under its control ... with no compensation or benefit for the State treasury", a United Nations investigation found.

The US Dodd–Frank Act was supposed to help bring about the end of conflict diamonds and minerals in the US. The idea was that public opinion would force divestment over time. Section 1502 does not require divestment, but does mandate disclosure. But instead the disclosure requirement has simply meant new business opportunities for money launderers.

As recently as 2014 the UN found that 70 percent of DRC gold was sold in Dubai without any problem, while gold continued to provide important funding for both the army and armed rebel groups.

=== Dan Gertler and Beny Steinmetz ===
In March 2005, Dan Gertler International formed a new company, Global Enterprises Corporate (GEC), with Global Resources, owned by Beny Steinmetz. A former DRC mines minister, Simon Tuma-Waku, was "special adviser". The company formed a joint copper and cobalt mining venture with DRC agency La Générale Des Carriers et Des Mines (Gécamines), which held 25%, and GEC 75%, which they placed into an Isle of Man holding company, Nikanor plc. The IPO raised £400 million in London and the company eventually reached a market capitalization of $1.5 billion for an initial investment of $3 million.

- In January 2010 Gécamines revoked a joint venture contract for the Kingamyambo Musonoi tailings copper project with First Quantum Minerals, a Canadian company which had spent $750 million on a treatment plant at the site.
- A majority stake was then sold to Highwinds Group, which paid $60 million and turned out to be owned by Gertler.
- Gertler sold Camrose, another offshore company that owned Highwinds, to a Kazakhstan entity for $689 million.
- A lawsuit, First Quantum vs Highwinds and others, subsequently recovered more than a billion dollars.

Steinmetz appears in 282 leaked documents; Gertler of Dan Gertler Inc, who had ties to Joseph Kabila and his closest aide, more than 200. The presidential decree that ratified the agreement was issued despite the recommendation against it by the anti-corruption Lutundula Commission.

=== Jaynet Désirée Kabila Kyungu ===
According to the Panama Papers, Kabila's twin sister owns part of an offshore company with interests in Congo that include a part of mobile-phone company Vodacom Congo. The government called a press conference to warn journalists against printing the names of any Congolese figures that might appear in the documents. Kabila's sister, Jaynet Désirée Kabila Kyungu and Feruzi Kalume Nyembwe, an advisor to their late father and former president Laurent-Désiré Kabila are both directors of Keratsu Holding Limited, a company registered in Niue through Mossack Fonseca a few months after the elder Kabila's assassination. Keratsu held 19.6% of the shares in Congolese Wireless Network, which held 49% of Vodacom Congo.

=== Lucien Ebata ===
Lucien Ebata, a Kinshasa businessman, runs Orion Group SA, registered in the Seychelles in 2009 by Mossack Fonseca through the Luxembourg-based Figed, according to the Panama Papers. Ebata, who receives a salary of a million dollars, does a business volume of around a billion, and counts both Shell and the Société nationale des pétroles du Congo (SNPC) among his customers.

== Dubai ==
In theory American and European buyers of gold in Africa are required to review their supply chain and report any use of conflict resources, such as gold from eastern Congo. In practice the requirement is widely ignored, and an investigation by African Network of Centers for Investigative Reporting (ANCIR) found examples in the leaked Mossack Fonseca documents of anonymous shell companies doing the sourcing. For a start, most of the DRC gold winds up in Dubai by way of Uganda. Dubai's $75 billion gold industry is regulated with a very light hand by the quasi-private Dubai Multi Commodities Centre (DMCC).

Kalotti, which exports about 40% of Dubai's gold, bought about $5.2 billion in gold in 2012 with little to no paperwork, according to Ernst & Young partner Amjad Rihan. Rijan has said that both the DMCC and his employer squashed his concerns, and the DMCC changed its audit procedures to ensure a more favorable outcome in the future. ANCIR journalists obtained records showing that Kalotti has sold "scrap gold" to other refiners including Valcambi. Leaked documents show PAMP Holding Mauritius signed an agreement with MKS Holding BV and two shell companies described as its beneficial owners: Panama-based Mountside Investment and Hong Kong-based Dynamic Bonus Limited. In 2010 MKS Holdings owned 72% of a joint venture between MMTC Ltd., owned by the State of India, and Switzerland's PAMP. This joint venture does supply big multinationals like Apple.

== Egypt ==
Alaa Mubarak, son of former president Hosni Mubarak, was cited as owning, through holding companies, real estate properties in London. The assets of his Virgin Islands-registered firm Pan World Investments were frozen in response to a European Union order when his father stepped down in 2011 during the Arab Spring. Mossack Fonseca was fined $37,500 in 2013 for lack of due diligence. Alaa and his brother were convicted last year of embezzling state funds and still face trial for insider trading.

Egyptian businessmen Mohamed Abu El-Enein, Ahmed Bahgat, Ashraf Marwan, Ibrahim Kamal, Mohamed Nosseir, Mohamed Mansour, Raouf Ghabbour, and Mohamed Al-Maghraby are all named in the leaked documents, as well as the Orascom Development Holding company, headed by Samih Sawiris, and also the Alexbank, Banque Misr, and Banque du Caire.

Former Sudanese President Ahmed al-Mirghani was a client of Mossack Fonseca also. Al-Mirghani lived in Egypt after the 1989 coup that ended his presidency and was active in the Democratic Unionist Party. Orange Star Corporation bought a long-term lease in a tony London neighborhood near Hyde Park for $600,000 the same year al-Mirghani created it, and at the time of his death held assets worth $2.72 million.

== Gabon ==
Every Ramadan he fed 500 people; he financed about 20 pilgrimages to Mecca every year. Described as a billionaire, Seydou Kane holds diplomatic passports from Senegal, Gabon and Mali. The protocol officer of the Senegalese Embassy in Paris was waiting for him when his plane landed at Roissy-Charles-de-Gaulle in November 2015. But Kane, a close associate of the Gabonese ruling family, was questioned and jailed in Nanterre for ten hours by anti-corruption agents in connection with an investigation opened in July 2007.

In January 2013 Kane was briefly questioned while in transit to Miami at Le Bourget by French authorities whose curiosity was piqued by €2.5 million cash he had on his person.

According to Senegalese daily Libération, the money-laundering unit Tracfin became interested in 2006 in a €300,000 payment from Groupe Marck, a French company specializing in military uniforms and anti-riot gear, to a Monaco-based entity called Citp. Citp was managed by Kane, a close friend of the president's chief of staff, Maixent Accrombessi, himself held in Paris and interrogated in August 2015. French officials wanted to ask Accrombessi about a contract between Marck and the Gabonese Ministry of the Interior for €7 million. The head of Marck, Philippe Belin, was also held and questioned. The investigation was assigned to Roger Le Loire, who also conducted the so-called "ill-gotten goods" investigation, which targeted a number of African leaders including the father and predecessor of Ali Bongo Ondimba, the current president of Gabon.

Mossack Fonseca opened two holding companies for Kane in 2013 and 2014: Maxi Gold International Limited and Smart Key LTD, which according to their paperwork traded in sundries on the one hand and gym equipment on the other.

== Ghana ==
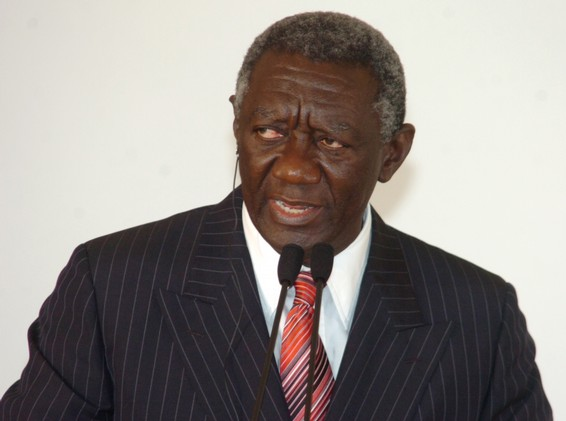
John Agyekum Kufuor, former President of Ghana

John Addo Kufuor, son of John Agyekum Kufuor, had Mossack Fonseca manage his trust starting in 2001 when his father took office. The trust held $75,000 in a bank account in Panama; his mother was also a beneficiary. He was linked to two other offshore companies also registered during his father's term. They are now inactive.

Kojo Annan, son of former Secretary-General of the United Nations Kofi Annan, appears with Laolu Saraki, the son of the late Nigerian senator Abubakar Olusola Saraki, as shareholders in Blue Diamond Holding Management Corp, registered by Mossack Fonseca in the British Virgin Islands in 2002. The two were directors of Sutton Energy Ltd, also registered in the British Virgin Islands in 2002, then transferred to Samoa. In 2015, Annan used another shell company first registered in the British Virgin Islands, then transferred to Samoa, to purchase an apartment in London for $500,000.

== Guinea ==
In 2008–2009, the Beny Steinmetz Group Resources (BSGR) and its owner Beny Steinmetz paid just $165 million for the mining rights to the northern portion of Simandou mine, located in the Nzérékoré region of Guinea's interior. Soon after, he sold 51 percent of the rights to Vale for $2.5 billion. Rio Tinto, which had previously held the concession, had invested $450 million into infrastructure at the site. Global Witness says BSGR in fact paid nothing for the rights, and the $165 million represents BSGR's self-reported investment in improvements at the site. It adds that either way BSGR's profit exceeded the national budget of Guinea.

US authorities say that Steinmetz paid Mamadie Touré $5.3 million for her help in obtaining the concession from her husband Lansana Conté, president of Guinea, shortly before he died. According to Global Witness, an offshore company belonging to Touré, Matinda, received a payment of $2.4 million from a company named Pentler Holdings. Several more payments were promised as well as 5% of BSGR shares in Simandou. Pentler owned 17.65% of BSGR Guinea.

Guinean President Alpha Condé launched an investigation after he was elected in 2010. Separately, so did the US Federal Bureau of Investigation (FBI) and the US justice department, suspecting violations of the Foreign Corrupt Practices Act. In August 2014 Mossack Fonseca received a Tax Information Exchange Agreement (TIEA) notice from the US government inquiring into ownership of Pentler and two other BSGR companies administered by Mossack Fonseca's Geneva office. However, the president of Pentler's financial management firm, Menachem Eitan, was a fugitive from the US SEC facing charges over a $55 million Ponzi scheme.

Guinea's Mines Minister Mohamed Lamine Fofana said in 2012 that BSGR "didn't follow the law".

== Ivory Coast ==
Jean-Claude N'Da Ametchi, an advisor to former president Laurent Gbagbo, who refused to accept that he lost an election in 2010, is also mentioned in the leaked documents. The European Union sanctioned banker N'Da Ametchi in 2011 for helping to finance the Gbagbo regime. His offshore company, Cadley House Ltd, was registered in the Seychelles with bearer bonds and a bank account in Morocco. N'Da Ametchi sent email in 2011 to the Geneva office of Mossack Fonseca, naming the Geneva-based Banque Pasche financial managers of the company. In September 2012 he acted as sole director to request they transfer its registration to Abidjan. Neither Mossack Fonseca nor the banks mentioned the European sanctions; these were eventually lifted in 2012. The company was apparently still active in 2015, according to documents seen by Le Monde. He is currently an advisor to former prime minister Charles Konan Banny, who lost the October 2015 presidential election.

== Kenya ==
Former Deputy Chief Justice Kalpana Rawal was a director or shareholder in four holding companies and was active in two after she took office. Her husband owns another seven. The companies were used for real estate transactions in Britain. Rawal and her husband were shareholders and directors of Highworth Management Services, where Ajay Shah, a former director of Trust Bank, was also a shareholder and director. The Central Bank of Kenya ordered Shah's assets auctioned to repay depositors after Trust Bank collapsed, but he went into hiding and the assets have not been recovered.

== Morocco ==
Mounir Majidi, personal secretary of King Mohammed VI was designated in March 2006 as the representative of SMCD Limited created in 2005 through Geneva financial advisor Dextima Conseils. According to the ICIJ, through SMCD Majidi bought the "Aquarius W", a 1930s-era luxury sailboat, which was then registered in Morocco as "El Boughaz", belonging to the king. SMCD, according to the ICIJ, also made a loan to a Luxembourg company, Logimed Investissements Co SARL, for which details are not available. Following this loan, SMCD was liquidated in 2013.

== Namibia ==
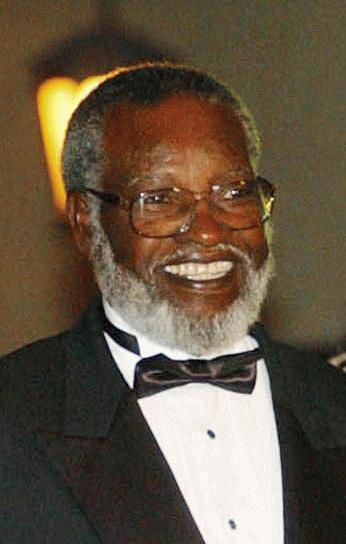
Sam Nujoma, former President of Namibia

Diamond Ocean Enterprises, a Mossack Fonseca entity set up in 2005, reported its purpose as financial consulting to a Namibian diamond manufacturer and polisher. According to the law firm's records, Deutsche Investment Consultants (Asia) Limited, a Mossack Fonseca company set up in the British Virgin Islands for the now-imprisoned Mafioso Vito Palazzolo by Wolf-Peter Berthold, a German banker based in Hong Kong, is a director of the firm. Its shareholders include Peter von Palace Kolbatschenko, Palazzolo's son, Berthold, and Giovanni Agusta.

Also in 2005, Zacharias (Zacky) Nujoma, youngest son of Sam Nujoma, set up two holding companies, Avila Investments and Marbella Investments, and licensed them to buy and cut diamonds. Shortly afterwards 90% of the stock was transferred to Diamond Ocean. In 2006 Nujoma established Ancash Investments, which obtained seven exclusive uranium prospecting licenses. Palazzolo loaned the company US$10 million. Canadian mining company announced it would partner with Ancash in its uranium contracts and said it based its decision in part on Ancash's strong international support in Natural Earth International Ltd. of Hong Kong. Natural Earth is another Deutsche Investment company.

== Nigeria ==
"Corrupt officials have stolen $150 billion from Nigeria in the last 10 years," said Nigerian President Muhammadu Buhari said April 7, 2016. He added that he planned to ask United States President Barack Obama for help.

=== Bukola and Toyin Saraki ===
President of the Nigerian Senate Bukola Saraki was found, through the Panama Papers leak, to have ties to at least four offshore companies he failed to declare to the Code of Conduct Bureau as Nigerian law requires. His wife Toyin also had shell companies listed in her name in the Mossack Fonseca documents: Girol Properties Ltd, Sandon Development Limited and *Landfield International Developments Ltd. Saraki has said that the assets in these holding companies belong to his wife's family and therefore he was not required to report them. ANCIR dismisses this because:

1. His close friend and aide is a shareholder in Sandon Development.
2. He has previously described himself, both in correspondence and in legal documents, as the shareholder of the Belgravia property owned by Sandon Development.
3. Toyin had her lawyers send a letter to ICIJ denying ownership of Girol Properties.

However, leaked documents do link her to the firm. But a handwritten note suggests Mossack Fonseca was aware that she was a nominee director.

=== Aliko Dangote ===
Aliko Dangote, chief executive of the Dangote Group, is tied in the leaked documents to four offshore companies, and to as many as 13 of his family and business associates are included. Dangote, with an estimated $17 billion worth, is currently involved in the construction of a $14 billion oil refinery in Lagos.

=== James Ibori ===
Former Delta State governor James Ibori is also mentioned in the leak. Ibori pleaded guilty in London in 2012 to siphoning $75 million out of Nigeria while he was in office from 1999 to 2007. All charges against him in Nigeria had been dropped in Nigeria following an election. Ibori was sentenced to 13 years. Mossack Fonseca, the registered agent for his four offshore entities, received a request in 2008 for information about his accounts from British Crown Prosecutors. His family's Julex Foundation was the shareholder in Stanhope Investments, a company incorporated in 2003 on the island of Niue, to which he funneled millions of dollars so he could buy a private jet. The United Kingdom returned £6.8 million to Nigeria from funds it had seized from accounts determined to have belonged to Ibori.

The anti-corruption taskforce of the Olusegun Obasanjo government, the Economic and Financial Crimes Commission, questioned at the time whether the Yar'Adua administration has refrained or was loath to pursue members of the Nigerian elite suspected of corruption, including leading financiers of the ruling party, or those like Ibori who had supported their election.

=== David Mark ===
Former Senate President David Mark was also listed as owner of eight shell companies in the leaked Panama Papers: Sikera Overseas S.A., Colsan Enterprises Limited, Goldwin Transworld Limited, Hartland Estates Limited, Marlin Holdings Limited, Medley Holdings Limited, Quetta Properties Limited and Centenary Holdings Limited.

=== Hakeem Belo-Osagie ===
A portion of the wealth owned by former Chairman of the United Bank for Africa (UBA), Hakeem Belo-Osagie, is domiciled in trusts and shell companies in some notorious tax havens around the world.

== Rwanda ==
The government of Rwanda uses an offshore company to lease a private jet for its senior politicians. Leaked documents show that Brigadier-General Emmanuel Ndahiro, using a London address, become a director of a British Virgin Islands company, Debden Investments Ltd. in 1998, owner of a jet aircraft. Ndahiro, a close advisor of president Paul Kagame, was then spokesman for Kagame's military. According to the Panama Papers the owner of the company was Hatari Sekoko, who ran a number of real estate and hotel ventures such as the Marriott in Kigali.

== Senegal ==
=== Karim Wade ===
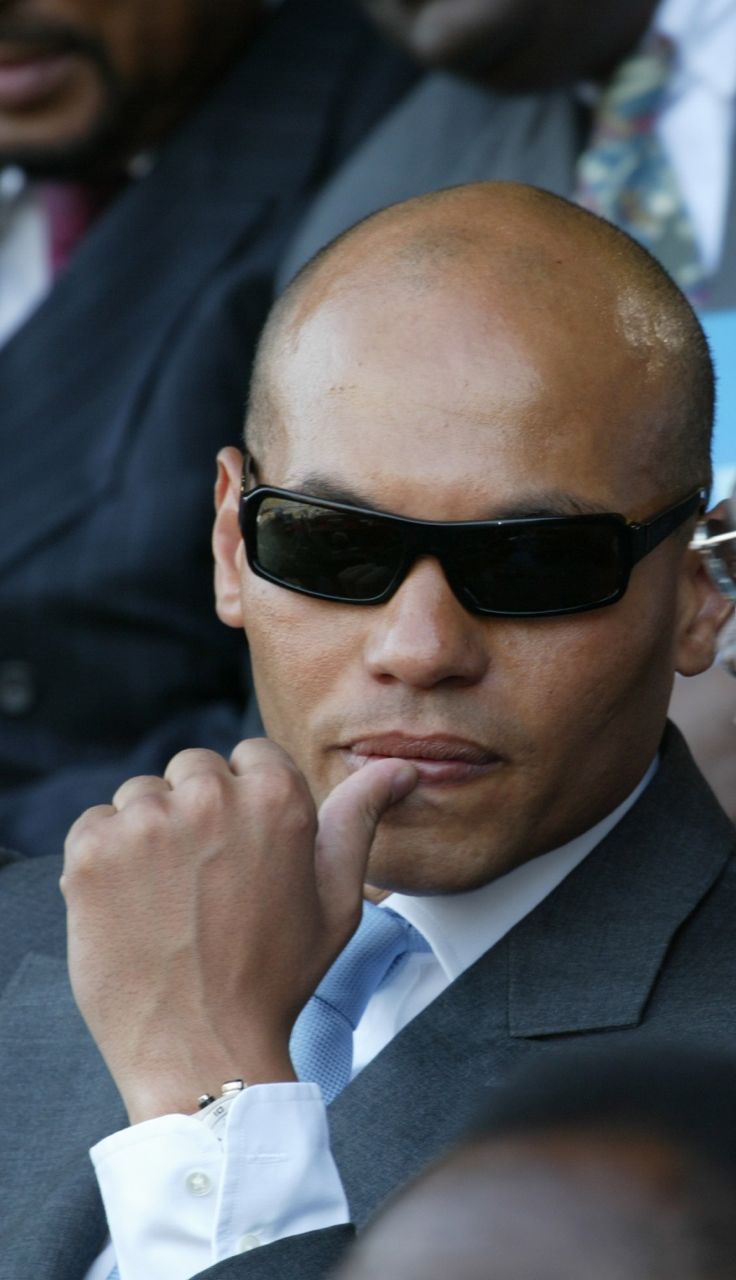
Senegalese politician Karim Wade

ICIJ partner Ouestaf.com was able to establish through the Panama Papers the existence of secret contracts between and DP World FZE (DP)and Mamadou Pouye, the bribery codefendant of Karim Wade, son of former prime minister Abdoulaye Wade. This information was not available at their trial; Ouestaf confirmed their financial ties to the corporation for the first time during the Panama Papers investigation. Wade was sentenced in 2015 to a six-year prison term by the Cour de répression de l'enrichissement illicite (Crei), a specialized anti-corruption court. Wade was accused of illegally amassing assets of more than $240 million; and his childhood friend Pouye was sentenced to five years for allegedly helping him. Both denied wrongdoing and the United Nations and Amnesty International said their rights had been violated at trial. Ouestaf's investigation did not address the legality of their trial. It did conclude that they had succeeded in tracing a payment to Pouye's oversea shell company from a subsidiary of DP.

Wade remains a member of the Senegalese Democratic Party (PDS) and is still the PDS candidate for the 2017 presidential election.

Mossack Fonseca documents show that Pouye owned three offshore companies, Seabury Inc, Regory Invest and Latvae Inc.

- Through Seabury, a consulting contract worth €7.2 million with DP World materialized.
- A second contract for 2013–2015 was to focus on DP's African holdings, and would have paid Wade and Puye $3 million at signing; however the pair were arrested.

Seabury seems to have been set up solely for doing business with DP World. It was started in 2008, a year after Senegal signed a contract with DP World for rights to the container terminal at the Autonomous Port of Dakar. In April 2009 Wade became minister of international cooperation, of territorial development, air transport and infrastructure, which he remained until his father's defeat by Macky Sall in the 2012 election. Regory Invest acted as a Seabury subcontractor, receiving €65,000 a month, according to the documents.

According to Ouestaf the documents make it clear that while Crei investigators were interested in the funds in Pouye's Monaco account, they did not know that their source was an offshore account he created himself. The two contracts prove that there was in fact a relationship between the defendants and DP World. Investigator Papa Alboury Ndao told the court in February that he had discovered two payments of $13 million each from a subsidiary of DP World FZE to a Singapore bank account belonging to Karim Wade. However the bank in Singapore refused to cooperate and Ndao was forced to drop that line of inquiry.

=== Others ===
Mossack Fonseca opened several offshore companies for multinationals. For example: Anglogold, owner of Anglogold Investments Senegal Ltd and Anglogold Exploration Senegal Ltd (both based in the British Virgin Islands).

Senegalese architect Pierre Atepa Goudiaby, a special advisor to former president Abdoulaye Wade, is also mentioned in the leaked documents. The Swiss law firm Fidinam SA had Mossack Fonseca open the offshore Atepa Engineering Corp in 2006, the same year Goudiaby opened his Paris office on the Champs-Elysées.

== Sierra Leone ==
The ICIJ investigation traces out many levels of offshore holdings in multiple countries related to the business dealings of Beny Steinmetz, with many serious findings such as a request that Mossack Fonseca backdate the revocation of a power of attorney. Mossack Fonseca records show that Sierra Leone diamond exporter Octea, based in the British Virgin Islands with the Steinmetz family as its beneficiaries, is wholly owned by Guernsey-based BSGR Resources, linked to a bribery scandal in Guinea. Foundations in Switzerland and Liechtenstein, among them Nysco and Balda, own BSGR. In 2007, one of Nysco's bank accounts contained $27.7 million.

Steinmetz, who has a personal fortune of $6 billion, supplies diamonds to Tiffany and DeBeers and is Sierra Leone's largest private investor. Yet, according to a detailed report in The Namibian, his Octea subsidiary owes, among other debts, property taxes of $700,000 to the city of Koidu. These unpaid taxes are discounted, according to mayor Saa Emerson Lamina, because Octea promised a 5% profit−sharing agreement, and payment of 1% of its annual profit to a community development fund, but it did not do this either.

Octea's subsidiary, Koidu Holdings, obtained the mine for $28 million, which was supposed to be a deposit, in 2002. Fighting had stopped in Sierra Leone, and the mine had previously been held and worked by South African firm Branch Energy, in payment for the services of its parent company, Executive Outcomes, "effectively...a military battalion for hire," against rebel fighters in the area. Steinmetz has since put $300 million into the project.

According to reporting by the African Network of Centers for Investigative Reporting (ANCIR), the company produces 60–90% of Sierra Leone's diamond exports, and in some months between 2012 and 2015 exported more than US$330 million in rough diamonds. Octea owes US$150 million in unpaid loans. Although government records show taxes paid by other diamond companies, none are listed for Octea.

The National Mineral Agency (NMA) until 2005 valued diamonds for export using a price book based on 1996 figures. Companies also often seek to minimize the value of their diamond exports to reduce taxes and move profits abroad. Once transferred to a subsidiary elsewhere where their value is not taxed, the same diamonds are frequently worth more.

Diamonds from Koidu average $330 a carat, roughly 50% more than De Beers's Jwaneng mine in Botswana, the world's biggest. Tiffany has first pick of some of the best stones mined at Koidu and the remainder are sold to other trade buyers, according to Bloomberg.

According to the World Bank, Sierra Leone for a long time based its growth forecasts on the success of two companies, one of which was Octea parent BSGR

== South Africa ==
Two men linked to Fidentia, a South African asset management company that looted 1.2 billion rand from pension funds meant to provide for 46,000 widows and orphans of mineworkers, had accounts with Mossack Fonseca, which was willing to help hide the money even after South Africa made their names public. The former chief executive of Fidentia, J. Arthur Brown, was sentenced in 2014 to concurrent 15-year sentences. The FBI arrested one man, Steven Goodwin, in Los Angeles in 2008. Sent back to South Africa, Goodwin was sentenced to 10 years in prison for fraud and money laundering. The other, Graham Maddock, was also later jailed in South Africa for fraud.

Khulubuse Zuma, nephew of South African President Jacob Zuma, has links in the documents to an offshore company with oil interests in the Democratic Republic of the Congo. He has denied any wrongdoing. According to leaked documents President Zuma also has ties to an oil mining deal between a British Virgin Islands-based oil company, Caprikat Limited, and Joseph Kabila, President of the Democratic Republic of Congo (DRC), and helped Caprikat obtain oil fields in the DRC then sent his nephew to the DRC to run the firm.

== Sudan ==
Former president Ahmed al-Mirghani surfaced as a client of Mossack Fonseca. Al-Mirghani, who was president from 1986 to 1989, created Orange Star Corporation in the British Virgin Islands through the Panama firm in 1995, when he was living in Egypt after the coup that ended his presidency. He was active in the Democratic Unionist Party there. Orange Star Corporation bought a long-term lease in a tony London neighborhood near Hyde Park for $600,000 the same year al-Mirghani created it, and at the time of his death held assets worth $2.72 million.

== Tunisia ==
The trial court prosecutor in Tunis ordered a judicial inquiry into the Panama Papers and Tunisian political figures suspected of hiring the firm. A judge from a Tunisian court specializing in financial crimes was assigned to the case. The Tunisian Assembly of the Representatives of the People established a parliamentary commission of inquiry as well

Newspaper Inkyfada had access to the documents and reported a dozen politicians, former government officials and lawyers had been implicated, as well as a leading media figure. Monday April 4, 2016, it reported that the former secretary-general of the Nidaa Tounes political party, Mohsen Marzouk, who was also the coordinator of the new political party, Machrouu Tounes, was on the point of creating his own account in December 2014, in the first presidential elections. Marzouk had written Mossack Fonseca about a company in the Virgin Islands, emphasizing a desire to hold funds and conduct business overseas. Marzouk denies this and has filed a defamation complaint.

Inkyfada was forced to briefly shut down its website following the report due to a cyberattack that attempted to insert names of politicians who had not been mentioned in the leaked documents.

== Uganda ==
Mossack Fonseca documents provide new insight and confirmation for a previously-litigated tax case where an offshore company transferred its registration to avoid paying capital gains tax in Uganda. The documents show that Heritage Oil and Gas Limited (HOGL) knew in advance of a capital gains tax that Uganda planned to enact. HOGL was then operating in Uganda and planned to sell half its Ugandan assets. It "urgently" moved its registration from the Bahamas to Mauritius to avoid the tax. Mauritius has a double taxation agreement with Uganda, meaning that HOGL would pay tax in only one of the two countries. But Mauritius does not have a capital gains tax, so by moving there Heritage reduced its capital gains tax to zero. Emails clearly show that this was the reason for the transfer, although company attorneys deny it.

In 2010, HOGL sold its 50 percent stake in Ugandan oil fields to Tullow Uganda for US$1.5 billion. The Uganda Revenue Authority (URA) applied a US$404 million capital gains tax on the transaction and HOGL refused to pay. A four-year battle in various courts ensued. Ugandan officials, including President Yoweri Museveni and the then-URA Commissioner-General Allen Kagina demanded the payment from Tullow, threatening not to renew its exploration licenses, which were about to expire, unless it deducted the tax from its payment to Heritage and remitted it to the URA. Eventually Tullow made a down payment and deposited the rest in escrow, pending legal resolution of its appeal, which came in 2013. Tullow also successfully sued HOGL to recover taxes they had paid on its behalf.

Heritage Gas and Oil is a subsidiary of Heritage Oil, founded by Conservative Party donor Tony Buckingham, who has given the party more than £100,000. As of December 31, 2008, he still owned 33.1% of Heritage Oil.

Uganda's ratio of tax to gross domestic product, at less than 14%, is one of the lowest in East Africa.

== Zimbabwe ==
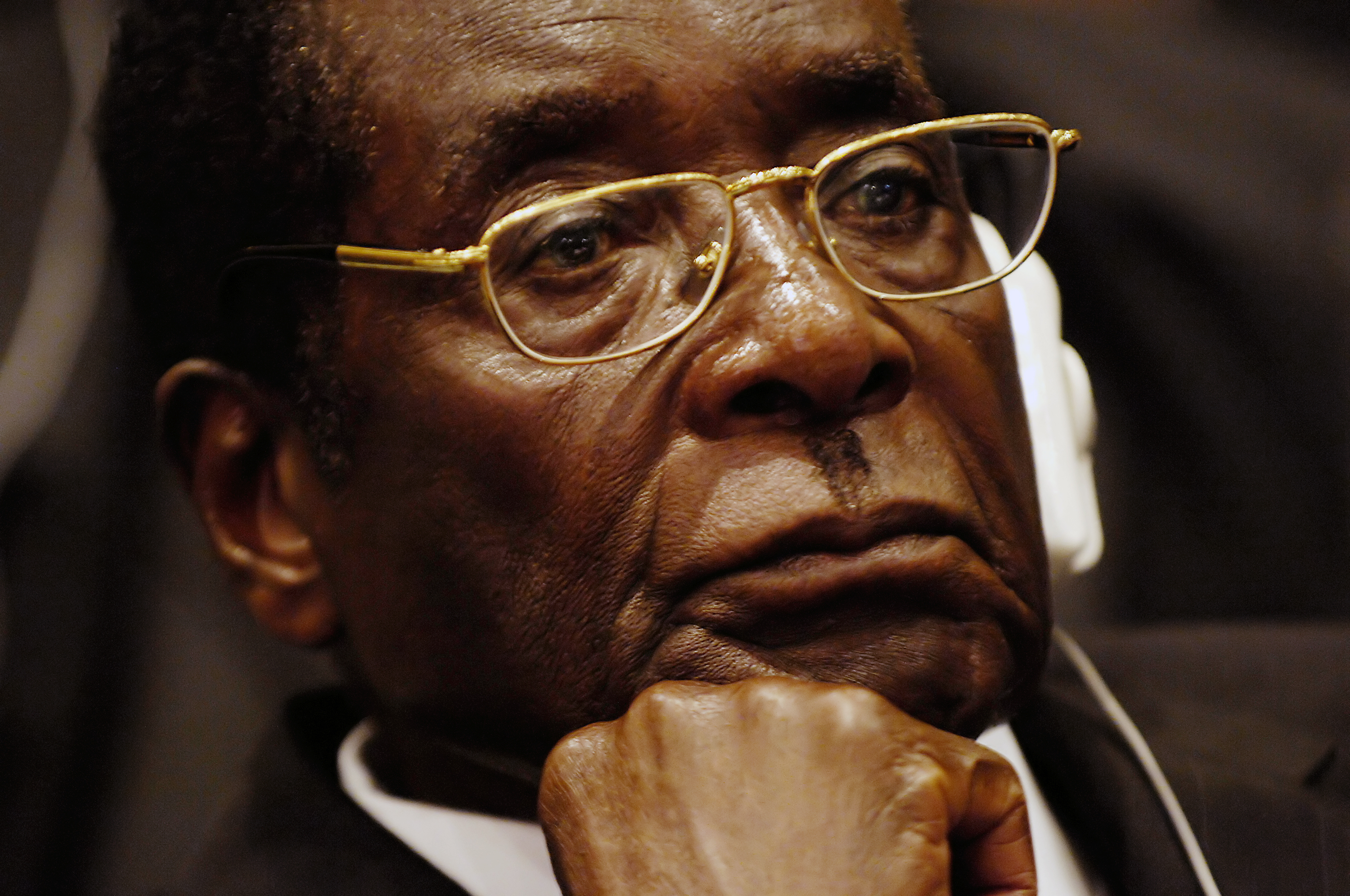
President Mugabe

An arms dealer and a mining tycoon with close links to President Robert Mugabe operated offshore companies despite US and European sanctions against them until 2013, more than four years after the sanctions were announced, according to the leaked documents.

According to the Panama Papers, Zimplats Holdings, a large platinum mining concern, set up a shell company to pay the salaries of its senior managers. Zimplats denies knowledge of the company, HR Consultancy. The company, which was still active in 2015, was unknown to the Reserve Bank of Zimbabwe, which may indicate externalization of funds and tax evasion if, as it appears, the salaries were for citizens of Zimbabwe performing work in Zimbabwe.
