= Mining industry of Guinea =

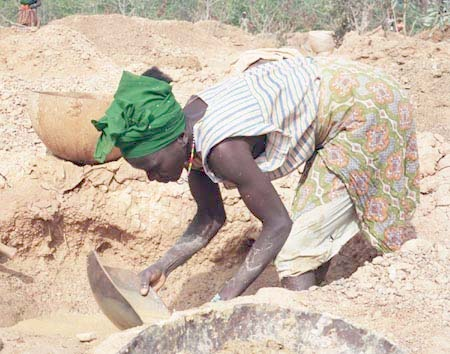
Mining in Siguiri, Guinea

The mining industry of Guinea was developed during colonial rule. The minerals extracted consisted of iron, gold, diamond, and bauxite. Guinea ranks first in the world in bauxite reserves and 6th in the extraction of high-grade bauxite, the aluminium ore. The mining industry and exports of mining products accounted for 17% of Guinea's gross domestic product (GDP) in 2010. Mining accounts for over 90% of its exports. The country accounts for 94% of Africa's mining production of bauxite. The large mineral reserve, which has mostly remained untapped, is of immense interest for international firms.

In recent years, the mining industry in Guinea has suffered from controversy, specifically with respect to the iron ore mining industry and the block of mines in Northern Guinea.

In 2019, the country was the world's 3rd largest producer of bauxite. In 2023, Guinea became the top source of bauxite for China.

== History ==
The mining tradition of Guinea is ancient and can be traced to a period before the Middle Ages, when gold and salt were trading commodities between Guinea and Ghana. Following the independence of Guinea from colonial rule, the economy of the country was largely dependent on the mining industry, in spite of political turmoil racking the country since 2011. The 1986 Mining Code was revised in 1995.

In September 2011 the Mining Code was reviewed once more and a new code implemented that took effect in 2012. Changes to the code included increases in state ownership in joint ventures from 15% to 35%.

In 2008, former model, Tigui Camara bought a 28% share in a mining company, and began her career in the sector. She established the Camara Diamond Traiding Network in 2009, and a holding company Tigui Mining Group (TMG) in 2012, and is the first woman in Guinea to own a mining company. In a 2018 interview, Camara discussed how: "... in the USA ... I worked as a model and representative of many jewelry houses. Which led me to ask quite a few questions about the origin of the jewelry, the practices, the impact that mining can have on local communities. The answers I got pushed me to get involved in this sector."

== Production and impact ==
Guinea's bauxite reserve is 7.4 billion metric tons, which is 26.4 percent of global reserves. High-grade iron ore reserves account for more than 4 billion tonnes. Diamond and gold deposits, as well as uranium, have also been reported. The mineral industry has provided job opportunities to 10,000 people. In the export sector, mining has contributed to as much as 90% of earnings from foreign exchange. Guinea now ranks sixth globally in the production of bauxite. Despite holding large mineral resources, Guinea, with more than 12,000,000 people, has a low income level, with the average wage less than one dollar a day.

There are two dozen international companies associated with mining operations in Guinea. The domestic agencies involved with mining are the Association pour la recherche et l'Exploitation du Diamant et de l'Or, Friguia Sal, Siguri Gold, and Société AMIG Mining International SARL.

== Commodities ==
Minerals extracted in the country by private-public joint enterprises in collaboration with the Government of Guinea include bauxite, iron ore, and diamonds. Other resources mined are cement, gold, salt, graphite, limestone, manganese, nickel, and uranium.

Large amounts of easily available (almost negligible soil and overburden) and high-quality (low silica content) bauxites are located in Boké Region in the so-called Boké Bauxite Belt. A major developer in the field of bauxite mining is the Alumina Company of Guinea (ACG-Fria), which is located in Fria; the government of Guinea holds a 49% share while the Reynolds Metals Company holds the 51% balance in this enterprise. Another partner in bauxite mining is Compagnie des Bauxites de Guinée (CBG). It is a joint venture of Alcoa, Rio Tinto, and Dado Mining holding a 51% share, and the Guinean government holding a 49% share. Its exports of bauxite are the largest in the world, reportedly in excess of 13.5 million tonnes in 2008.

Guinea has large reserves of iron ore with high potential for extraction. These largely remains untapped, and its quality grade is more than 60%. Rio Tinto's joint sector enterprise in the iron ore sector is the Simandou mine project, with a value estimated at $6 billion. In 2012, Simandou mine was projected to produce 90 million tons of iron ore annually. The Mount Nimba mine, also in the iron ore sector, is located in the Nzérékoré Region, while the Kalia mine is in the Faranah Region.

Diamond potential is estimated at 40 million carats. In 2012, production was 266,800 carats as per the Kimberley Process Certification Scheme, and it is listed as the 13th-largest producer.

A large number of gold mines are located in northeastern Guinea; the estimated production in 2011 was 15,695 kilograms. One of the country's largest gold mines is the Lefa mine in the Faranah Region. The Kalia Mine is owned by Bellzone Mining.

== Controversies and corruption in the mining industry ==
=== Dispute Involving Rio Tinto and BSGR ===
In 2008, the government revoked the Rio Tinto licence for the Simandou mine, awarding it instead to BSGR, a company associated with Beny Steinmetz. After the election of President Alpha Condé in 2010, investigations were launched into several allegations of corruption within the mining industry and the government of Guinea expropriated BSGR's rights to mine at Simandou. But in November 2016, Rio Tinto came under fire for alleged corruption, involving a $10.5 million bribe paid to an aide and close advisor of President Condé to influence him to give the Simandou licence back to Rio Tinto. Rio Tinto admitted making the payment and fired two senior executives. In February 2019, President Condé and BSGR reached an agreement to withdraw the mutual allegations of corruption. The agreement had BSGR relinquish its rights to Simandou and to the smaller Zogota deposit while allowing Niron Metals head Mick Davis to develop Zogota.

=== Dispute Involving Vale and BSGR ===
On the sidelines of this affair, Vale filed a claim against BSGR in 2014 at the London Court of International Arbitration to recover an upfront payment it had made to BSGR and money it invested in Guinea. The court decided in favor of Vale and awarded it $2 billion. In May 2020, BSGR filed discovery request documents at the court in New York based on transcripts of conversations with former Vale executives that were obtained by the Black Cube private intelligence company. BSGR claims that the documents prove that Vale was aware of potential problems with how the rights to develop Simandou had been obtained, but chose to ignore them and proceeded to buy 51% of the iron-ore licenses. This could undermine Vale's claims to compensation.

=== Accusations Against Och-Ziff and Government of Alpha Condé ===
There have been further corruption allegations levelled at President Condé's government involving bribery from the U.S. hedge fund Och-Ziff. In August 2016, Samuel Mebiame, who worked for the company, was arrested and charged in the U.S. with bribing Guinean and other African officials on behalf of Och Ziff to receive mining rights and access to secret information. According to the U.S. prosecutors, Mebiame was also part of a conspiracy to form a Guinean state-owned mining company and was involved in rewriting Guinea's mining code. Mebiame pleaded guilty to conspiring to make corrupt payments to African members of government in December 2016.

In 2017, Och-Ziff Capital Management Group came under investigation for several instances of bribery in the Guinean mining industry as well as widespread bribery across Africa. In September, a unit of Och-Ziff pled guilty to engaging in a multi-year bribery scheme; the judgement handed down included regulatory sanctions against Och-Ziff founder Daniel Och. In 2018, Michael Cohen, head of Och-Ziff European operations, was charged with ten counts of fraud. This followed a lengthy investigation by the Securities and Exchange Commission (SEC).

In September 2015, an investigation was launched into Mohamed Alpha Condé, the President's son. The French Financial Public Prosecutor charged him with embezzling public funds and receiving benefits from French firms that are involved in the Guinean mining industry.

=== Accusations Against Sable Mining ===
Another case of alleged corruption in the country's mining industry is based on the findings of an NGO called Global Witness. According to their report Sable Mining, an AIM-listed company, got close to President Condé prior to the elections and bribed his son in order to receive iron ore mining rights to the Mount Nimba mine. These allegations have been under investigation by Guinean authorities since March 2016.

== See also ==
- Simandou mine
- 2013 Guinea clashes
- Alpha Condé
- Vale
- Beny Steinmetz
- Corruption in Guinea

== Bibliography ==
- KPMG Global Mining Institute (2014). "Guinea: Country Mining Guide" (PDF). Strategy Series. KPMG International.
- Soumah, Ibrahima (1 January 2009). The future of Mining Industry in Guinea. Editions L'Harmattan. ISBN 978-2-296-21573-3.
