= Mick Davis =

British-South African businessman, financier and philanthropist

Sir Mick Davis

Chief Executive of the Conservative Party
- In office 27 June 2017 – 24 July 2019
- Deputy: Mike Chattey
- Leader: Theresa May
- Chairman: Patrick McLoughlin; Brandon Lewis
- Preceded by: Office established
- Succeeded by: Mike Chattey (Acting)

Treasurer of the Conservative Party
- In office 27 June 2017 – 24 July 2019
- Leader: Theresa May
- Deputy: Mike Chattey
- Chairman: Patrick McLoughlin; Brandon Lewis
- Preceded by: Andrew Fraser
- Succeeded by: Ehud Sheleg

CEO of Xstrata
- In office 2001–2013
- Succeeded by: Glencore

Personal details
- Born: Michael Lawrence Davis; 15 February 1958 (age 68) South Africa
- Party: Conservative
- Spouse: Barbara Davis
- Children: 3
- Education: Rhodes University
- Occupation: Businessman; financier; philanthropist; politician (former)
- Website: Party website

Sir Michael Lawrence Davis (born 15 February 1958) is a British-South African businessman, financier, philanthropist, and former politician. Davis was the chief executive officer (CEO) of Xstrata, an Anglo-Swiss multinational mining company, until its merger with Glencore in 2013, and former chief executive and treasurer of the Conservative Party. After leaving Xstrata, he formed the mining venture X2 Resources. He was the Chairman of the British Conservative Party until he exited that post in July 2019 along with outgoing Prime Minister Theresa May. Davis is the founder and CEO of Vison Blue Resources, a commodities investment company.

== Early life and education ==
Mick Davis was born to a South African Jewish family on 15 February 1958. He was educated at Theodor Herzl School, Port Elizabeth, South Africa. He has a bachelor of commerce degree from Rhodes University and is a qualified accountant.

== Business career ==
Davis was a senior manager with Peat Marwick Mitchell & Co, from 1980 to 1986. Davis was an executive director of the South African state-owned Eskom, one of the world's largest electricity utilities, before joining Gencor in 1994. Davis fixed Eskom's finances; however he left the company after not being selected as the CEO. He was executive chairman of Ingwe Coal Corporation from 1995, until appointed in July 1997 as chief financial officer and an executive director of Billiton.

Davis was CEO of Xstrata from 2001 until he left in 2013, after the company was taken over by Glencore in a merger that was characterized by some as "forced". This also caused a rift between Davis and Ivan Glasenberg, the then-CEO of Glencore, with whom Davis previously had a close business partnership. He gained GBP£75 million after his departure due through a combination of cash payments, share options and shares previously sold by him. He was noted for taking Xstrata from a mining company worth GBP£250 million into one of the world's largest natural resources companies that was worth GBP£37 billion on the London Stock Exchange in 2010.

In 2013, Davis formed the mining venture, X2 Resources, with former colleagues including former Xstrata finance director Trevor Reid and executives Thras Moraitis, Andrew Latham, Ian Pearce and Benny Levene. In 2015, he raised US$5.6 billion for X2 Resources to create a mining and metals group. In 2016, Davis shut X2 Resources after the company failed to make any deals.

Davis has extensive capital markets and corporate transactions experience. During his career, he has raised almost US$40 billion from global capital markets and completed over US$120 billion of corporate transactions. Some of his successes are the creation of the Ingwe Coal Corporation in South Africa; the listing of Billiton on the LSE; the merger of BHP and Billiton into the largest diversified mining company in the world; the initial public offering of Xstrata plc on the LSE in 2002 and Xstrata's subsequent acquisitions of MIM Holdings and Falconbridge Nickel Mines, amongst others. He was also noted for being responsible for the successful merger of Xstrata and Glencore.

In 2017, it was reported that Davis was being considered for the position of chairman of Rio Tinto. In 2021, Davis founded Vision Blue Resources, a commodites investment company. Since 2021, the company has invested in various mining and commodities companies, and has raised over US$650 million.

=== Ties to BSGR-Guinean bribery scandal ===
In May 2019 it was revealed by Global Witness that the mining firm Niron Metals, of which Davis was director and co-founder, was to take over the mining rights at the Zogota property in Guinea from the Israeli mining billionaire tycoon Beny Steinmetz' company BSGR after a surprise resolution to the bribery case between BSGR and the Guinean government in February 2019.

In 2008, BSGR bribed Mamadie Touré, the wife of Guinea’s then-president Lansana Conté, with millions of dollars to enlist her help in obtaining rights to develop one of the world's largest iron ore deposits worth an estimated $10 billion in the Simandou Mountains now called the Simandou mine. After obtaining the rights to prospect the region in December 2008 for $150 million, Steinmetz sold a 51% share to mining conglomerate Vale for $2.5 billion. Under a new president, Alpha Condé, BSGR's rights were revoked in 2014 and a court case was opened against the company by the Guinean government accusing them of bribing Mamadie Touré to obtain the mining rights. In September 2014 BSGR started an international arbitration proceeding against the Republic of Guinea in the International Centre for Settlement of Investment Disputes, challenging the government's decision to revoke its mining rights.

In February 2019, BSGR together with Guinean President Alpha Condé agreed to drop the pending arbitration case and all allegations of wrongdoing. As part of the agreement, BSGR would relinquish its rights to the Simandou deposit but maintain an interest in the Zogota deposit. This was to be developed by Davis at the head of Niron Metals, founded in 2018, after a payment of $50 million to the Guinean government.

Davis walked away from the company in 2021 after the Financial Times of London report said that "Davis had come to the view that it could take many years before Niron would be able to secure a route to market for Zogota’s iron ore and that he wanted to focus on other projects”.

== Charitable work ==
From 2009 to 2017 Davis was president of the council of members and chairman of the board of trustees of the Jewish Leadership Council of the United Kingdom, the umbrella body of the largest Jewish charities and Institutions in the UK responsible for the strategic imperatives of UK Jewry. He is also chairman of the Holocaust Memorial Commission of the United Kingdom. He is a trustee of the Foundation and Friends of the Royal Botanic Gardens, Kew. Davis is also a member of the Brookings International Advisory Council and a trustee of the Institute of National Security Studies. He is also a trustee of the Davis Foundation.

In February 2018 Davis came under criticism for allegedly participating in a cover-up in 2013 of alleged financial impropriety at the Jewish Leadership Council charity where he was Chair. The Jewish Chronicle subsequently published parts of emails by Davis outlining his proposed resolution to have the CEO resign on the grounds of ill health and that he hoped the full details would not be leaked.

== Politics ==
In 2016, Davis was appointed treasurer of the British Conservative Party. In June 2017, he was also appointed CEO of the party. In October 2017, commentator Iain Dale placed Davis at number 83 in 'The Top 100 Most Influential People on the Right'. In March 2018, along with David Brownlow, Davis donated money to pay Ben Bradley's legal bills resulting from Bradley's tweet falsely accusing Jeremy Corbyn of "selling British secrets to communist spies in the 1980s". Davis resigned as CEO and Treasurer of the Conservative Party on 24 July 2019.

== Personal life ==
His wife Barbara is a solicitor. They live in London. He has three children, Sarah, Ronit and Eitan.

In the 2015 Queen's Birthday Honours, he was appointed a Knight Bachelor 'for services to Holocaust Commemoration and Education'.

He holds an honorary doctorate from Bar Ilan University.
