= Suzdal (disambiguation) =

Suzdal is a historical town in Vladimir Oblast, Russia.

Suzdal may also refer to:

- Suzdal Urban Settlement, a municipal formation which the town of Suzdal in Suzdalsky District of Vladimir Oblast, Russia is incorporated as
- Suzdal mine, a gold mine in Kazakhstan
- Commander Suzdal, a fictional character from The Crime and the Glory of Commander Suzdal, a 1964 sci-fi short story by Cordwainer Smith

== See also ==
- Vladimir-Suzdal Principality (1168–1389), one of the major principalities that succeeded Kievan Rus'
- Principality of Suzdal—Nizhny Novgorod
- Suzdal Kremlin, the historical kremlin of the town of Suzdal, Russia
- Suzdalsky (disambiguation)
