= Corruption in Guinea =

In 2016, Guinea was ranked 142nd out of 176 countries on the Corruption Perceptions Index published by Transparency International. According to the index Guinea scored a 27 out of 100 for the perceived level of public sector corruption. This is the highest corruption score the country has received since 2006. The lowest score, 16 points, was reached in 2008.

== Political background ==
In 1958 Guinea gained its independence from France and Ahmed Sékou Touré, leader of the Democratic Party of Guinea-African Democratic Rally (PDG), became president. France left the country in grave economic crisis and Touré received extensive financial assistance from the communist bloc and later from Western nations as well.

In 1971 following a coup attempt, Touré began violently oppressing any sort of opposition to his rule. He remained in power until he died, in 1984. In April of the same year, hours before another president was to be elected from the PDG, Colonels Lansana Conté and Diarra Traoré took power in a coup, though there was a power struggle and corruption allegations between the two. Once in power, Conté instituted a number of reforms, including a return to civilian rule, and retained firm control over Guinea’s natural resources. He remained in power until his death in 2008.

In 2010 Alpha Condé, the leader of the opposition party Rally of the Guinean People (RGP), was elected president after a lengthy election period which was full of accusations of corruption and violence. His election campaign promises included reform of the state, tackling corruption and reviewing mining contracts. However, his administration has been plagued by corruption allegations including bribes paid by international corporations in order to receive mining rights.

There are many doubts regarding the lawfulness of Condé's election. For example, in March 2011, the army briefly took over Conakry port, which had been under the management of the French firm NCT Necotrans. The government breached their long-term contract with Necotrans and gave the managing rights to a different French company, the Bolloré Group. There are many speculations about the political and financial promises that were exchanged in order to secure this redistribution of power over the port. Necotrans has claimed in court that Condé was rewarding Bollore for having financed his 2010 political campaign.

In 2012 Condé suspended elections that had been postponed time and again since mid-2011, for an indefinite period due to alleged "technical problems", that he claimed could jeopardize the transparency and credibility of the democratic process.

The long delays led to clashes between police, opposition parties, and the ruling party as well as an increase in ethnic tension and violence in some regions of Guinea. At least 400 people were injured and up to 60 people were killed. On September 28, 2013 the election finally took place, however several international observers, including groups from the US, France, the European Union (EU) and the United Nations (UN) stated that the voting process was plagued with irregularities, technical problems and corruption. President Alpha Condé dismissed the allegations as "political rhetoric" and said he would not allow anyone to destabilize his country.

Guinea's vast natural resources have ensured that international interest in Guinea, specifically in the mining sector, remains high, but has also led to many corruption scandals over the past sixty years. While Guinea is one of the ten most mineral-rich countries in Africa it ranks among the poorest countries of the world. 73.8% of the population are multidimensionally poor and an additional 12.7% live near multidimensional poverty.

== Corruption in the energy industry ==
Hyperdynamics Corporation is a Houston-based independent energy company. The company’s primary focus is oil and gas exploration in Guinea. In 2013 Hyperdynamics was investigated by the US Securities and Exchange Commission (SEC) and the United States Department of Justice in relation to their business in Guinea. According to the SEC, in 2007-2008 Hyperdynamics paid $130,000 for PR and lobbying services in Guinea to two supposedly unrelated local entities, but the company could not produce documentation that proved the services were actually provided. Towards the end of 2008, Hyperdynamics disclosed that a Guinean-based employee controlled both entities, but still could not determine if and how the money was spent and whether any services were provided. They also couldn't recover the funds. In 2009 Hyperdynamics made major internal changes; they replaced the senior management and entire board of directors, conducted an overall policy revision, and more. In 2015 the SEC and Hyperdynamics resolved the case internally. Hyperdynamics agreed to pay a $75,000 penalty without admitting or denying the findings. The company spent roughly $7.5 million on the investigation.

== Corruption in the finance industry ==
In May 2012, Aïssatou Boiro was appointed national director of the state treasury with a mandate to end corruption at the highest levels of government including Minister of Finance Kerfella Yansane and a group of corrupt employees of the Central Bank. She was investigating the disappearance of over 13 billion Guinean francs from state banks. As a result of her investigations, nine government employees were arrested on charges of corruption. During her short tenure she started receiving death threats, but she was not afforded government protection. On November 9, 2012 Boiro was assassinated in Conakry by a group of armed men in Guinean army uniform.

The U.S. State Department spoke out after the murder, urging the Guinean government to investigate fully.

Two weeks after Boiro's murder her husband Ibrahima Boiro was appointed Minister of the Environment for Lakes and Forests.

== Corruption in the security industry ==
In January 2017, acting CEO of IRIS Corporation Berhad, Datuk Hamdan Mohd Hassan, was arrested by the Malaysian Anti-Corruption Commission in relation to an e-passport project the company was conducting in Guinea. Iris had signed a 15-year contract with the Guinean government for the full implementation of the project. According to the charges, Hamdan was involved in corrupt practices as part of the project. The company distanced itself from Hamad's alleged illegal actions and stated the project would continue as planned.

== Corruption in the mining industry ==
The mining industry in Guinea is the source of both its wealth and corruption at all levels of government. Guinea has massive bauxite reserves as well as untapped gold, diamond and uranium deposits. International mining companies control much of Guinea’s mining wealth and there are over two dozen such companies involved in the industry. Nominally, the mining industry operates under public-private joint ventures, but corruption allegations, charges and cases have been brought against all of Guinea’s presidents, including current president Alpha Condé.

In 2017, the Securities and Exchange Commission (SEC), accused Och-Ziff executives of participating in a far-reaching bribery scheme to win business in the mining sector in many African countries including Guinea. In 2018, the head of European operations for Och-Ziff Capital Management Group, Michael Cohen, was indicted and charged with fraud by the Securities and Exchange Commission (SEC). He was charged with ten counts of fraud, including investment adviser fraud and conspiracy to commit wire fraud.

In August 2016 Samuel Mebiame, son of former Gabonese prime minister, pleaded guilty to bribing government officials in Chad, Guinea and Niger. Mebiame started working as go-between for Africa Investments, a joint venture of Och Ziff and Palladino Holdings in 2008. Under this capacity, he bribed senior government officials in Guinea to obtain mining deals and confidential information.

According to court reports, Mebiame was in close contact with Guinean government members including Minister of Mines Thiam and President Conde before his election and during his tenure.

Court documents also state that Mebiame and Walter Hennig, founder of Palladino, were involved in rewriting the Guinean mining code after Condé assumed office, and that they used correspondences they had written on official state letterhead and signed by a Guinean minister against their competitor mining firms.

In 2011 Hennig signed a contract with Guinean Government, lending the state $25 million to set up a state-owned mining company. According to the agreement, in the event of a default in payment, Hennig's Palladino would obtain a 30% share in the Guinean company at a very large discount. However, in 2012, after the conspicuous loan was widely reported, Condé repaid it in full and the partnership was halted.

=== Simandou Mine ===
In 2008, Rio Tinto had its license revoked for the mineral rich Simandou mine. The license was then awarded to BSGR. In 2014 after a four-year-long investigation of the legality of BSGR's mining license, the Guinean government revoked the company's mining rights in Simandou and re-awarded them to Rio Tinto. A month later, BSGR sought arbitration over the government's decision, claiming the allegations were baseless. In 2019, BSGR reached an agreement with the Guinean government to withdraw the mutual allegations of corruption and to drop the arbitration case. BSGR consented to relinquishing its rights to Simandou while Niron Metals head Mick Davis would be allowed to develop it.

In 2016, Rio Tinto admitted to bribing a government official to influence President Condé to give the mining rights back to Rio Tinto. President Condé denied these allegations and stated that he was not aware that Rio Tinto was paying his adviser. However, France 24 then published a collection of recordings that proved that the Guinean government knew of the transactions and was actively involved in them.

Rio Tinto launched an internal investigation into the matter and in November, suspended a senior executive and accepted the resignation of a second. In 2017, the Serious Fraud Office, the UK’s anti-fraud regulator, launched an investigation into Rio Tinto’s business in Guinea's mining industry, to examine the conduct of the company's management, employees and associates due to suspicions of widespread corruption.

=== Mount Nimba mine ===
NGO Global Witness reported that Sable Mining, which is part of AIM though currently suspended from the London-based index, paid bribes to Alpha Mohammed Condé, son of President Condé, and helped Condé in his election campaign to persuade him to award them the license for the iron ore concession at Mount Nimba.
