= Mike Chattey =

Chief Executive of the United Kingdom's Conservative Party

Mike Chattey OBE
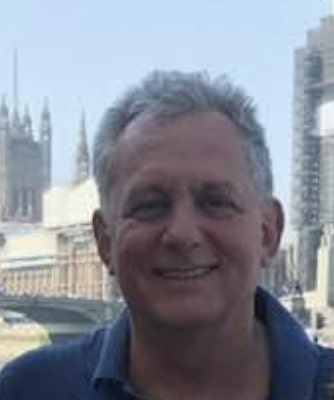

Chief Executive of the Conservative Party
- Acting
- In office 24 July 2019 – 1 March 2020
- Leader: Boris Johnson
- Chairman: James Cleverly; Ben Elliot; Amanda Milling
- Preceded by: Sir Mick Davis
- Succeeded by: Darren Mott

Head of Fundraising and Deputy Treasurer of the Conservative Party
- Incumbent
- Assumed office 21 December 2001
- Leader: Iain Duncan Smith; Michael Howard; David Cameron; Theresa May; Boris Johnson; Liz Truss; Rishi Sunak
- Treasurer: Sir Mick Davis; Sir Ehud Sheleg; Malik Karim; Graham Edwards
- Preceded by: Jane Keene

Personal details
- Born: 9 January 1961 (age 65)
- Party: Conservative
- Spouse: Baroness Vere of Norbiton (m. 2016)
- Education: University of North Carolina at Chapel Hill

Michael Stanley Kemp Chattey OBE (born 9 January 1961) has been the head of fundraising at the Conservative Party since 2001. He was the deputy of Mick Davis,

In June 2016, Chattey was awarded an OBE in David Cameron's resignation honours list for "political service" in his role as head of fundraising.

Chattey has been married to Charlotte Vere since 2016.

== Responsibilities ==
Chattey, as head of fundraising, has responsibility for the donation and fundraising efforts of the Conservative Party.

He conducts his role of head of fundraising from the party's central office, known as CCHQ in the Treasurer's Department.

== Early life ==
Chattey was educated at Milton Abbey School in Dorset between 1974 and 1979, before attending the University of North Carolina at Chapel Hill in 1980, followed by the University of the West of England from 1980 to 1984, gaining a 2:1 in business studies.

== Career ==
Chattey spent two years as regional salesman in the southwest for Calor Gas. He then moved to London to start a 15-year career in advertising, predominantly for Evans Hunt Scott and Leo Burnett Advertising, working on South African Airways, COI, Kelloggs, Procter & Gamble, McDonald's, Kodak, Sun Alliance and Commodore Computers. He was hired by Lord Ashcroft in 2002 to join The Conservative Party's Treasurers' Department. He was promoted to head of fundraising in 2012.
