= Treasurer of the Conservative Party =

United Kingdom office

The office of Treasurer of the Conservative Party was established in 1911, along with that of Chairman, as part of a wider reorganisation of the Conservative and Unionist Party's machinery following the party's failure to win the general elections of January and December 1910.

The officeholders are responsible for fundraising, and in recent years, have sat on the Conservative Party Board.

== List ==
This is a list of treasurers of the Conservative Party.

Name	From	To	Deputy	Notes
The Lord Farquhar	1911	1923		Created Viscount Farquhar in 1917, and Earl Farquhar in 1922
Sir George Younger	1923	1929		Created Viscount Younger of Leckie in 1923
Sir Samuel Hoare MP	1929	1931		MP (1910-44); created Viscount Templewood in 1944
The Lord Ebbisham	1931	1933		
The Lord Greenwood	1933	1938		Created Viscount Greenwood in 1937
The Lord Marchwood	1938	1946		Created Viscount Marchwood in 1945
Christopher Holland-Martin	1947	1960		Also an MP from 1951-1960; Died in office
The Lord De L'Isle and Dudley	1948	1952		Created Viscount De L'Isle in 1956
Oliver Poole	1952	1955		Created Baron Poole of Aldgate in 1958
Sir Henry Studholme MP	1956	1962		MP (1952-66); created a Baronet in 1956
Robert Allan MP	1960	1965		MP (1951-66); created Baron Allan of Kilmahew in 1973
Richard Stanley	1962	1965		Former MP (1950-6)
The Lord Chelmer	1965	1977		
Sir Tatton Brinton MP	1966	1974		MP (1964-74)
Sir Arnold Silverstone	1974	1977		Created Baron Ashdown in 1975; Died in office
William Clark MP	1974	1975		MP (1959-66, 1970-92); created Baron Clark of Kempston in 1992
Alistair McAlpine	1975	1990		Created Baron McAlpine of West Green in 1984
The Lord Boardman	1979	1983		Former MP (1967-74)
Sir Oulton Wade	1982	1990		Created Baron Wade of Chorlton in 1990
Sir Charles Johnston	1984	1988		Created Baron Johnston of Rockport in 1987
Sir Hector Laing	1988	1993		Created Baron Laing of Dunphail in 1991
The Lord Beaverbrook	1990	1992		
Sir John Cope MP	1990	1992		MP (1974-97); created Baron Cope of Berkeley in 1997
Tim Smith MP	1992	1994		MP (1977-9; 1982-97); Resigned as Treasurer during the 1994 Cash-for-questions affair
Philip Harris	1993	1997		Created Baron Harris of Peckham in 1995
Charles Hambro	1993	1997		Created Baron Hambro in 1994
Sir Graham Kirkham	1997	1998		Created Baron Kirkham in 1999
Michael Ashcroft	1998	2001		Created Baron Ashcroft in 2000
Howard Leigh	2000	2005		Created Baron Leigh of Hurley in 2013
Sir Stanley Kalms	2001	2003		Created Baron Kalms in 2004
George Magan	2003	2007		Created Baron Magan in 2011
Jonathan Marland	2003	2007		Created Baron Marland in 2006
Michael Spencer	2007	2010		Nominated for a peerage in 2013, 2015 and 2016, but blocked on each occasion by the House of Lords Appointments Commission Created Baron Spencer at the fourth attempt in 2020
Richard Harrington	2008	2010		MP (2010-9); created Baron Harrington in 2022
Stanley Fink	2009	2013		Created Baron Fink in 2011
Catherine Meyer	2010	2015		Created Baroness Meyer in 2018
Peter Cruddas	2011	2012		Created Baron Cruddas in 2020. Had resigned as Treasurer in 2012 over a "cash for access" scandal; successfully sued the Sunday Times over their allegations in 2013, but in 2015 the Court of Appeal reduces the libel damages awarded earlier from £180,000 to £50,000, after they found the central "cash for access" allegation of the Sunday Times to be borne out by the facts, while other parts of their article were still deemed to be false and defamatory Cruddas' nomination to the Lords had been opposed by the House of Lords Appointments Commission, who cited the Court of Appeal's ruling; however, Prime Minister Boris Johnson became the first Prime Minister to disregard a veto from the vetting body, and announced Cruddas's peerage all the same.
Michael Farmer	2011	2015		Created Baron Farmer in 2014
James Lupton	2013	2016		Created Baron Lupton in 2015
Andrew Fraser	2016	2018	Jane Keene	Created Baron Fraser of Corriegarth in 2016
Sir Mick Davis	2016	2019	Mike Chattey OBE	Declined a peerage in 2019
Aamer Sarfraz	2019	2020	Jane Keene	Created Baron Sarfraz in 2019
Sir Ehud Sheleg	2019	2021		Knighted in 2019
Malik Karim	2021	2022		
Graham Edwards	2022	present		
