= Mamadie Touré =

- Spouse: Lansana Conté

Mamadie Touré is the widow and the youngest of former Guinean president Lansana Conté's four wives.

Her name appears in numerous investigations into the activities of Pentler Holdings, which is said to have transferred through a network of shell companies at least one payment of $2.4 million US—with more pledged—to her offshore company, Matinda, in return for her help obtaining a concession in Simandou mine from her husband shortly before his death.

Beny Steinmetz, an Israeli diamond mining magnate, was convicted of corruption for the bribe.
