= Graham Henry Edwards =

British businessman and politician (born 1964)

Graham Henry Edwards (Born January 1964) is a British businessman and Conservative Party official. He is the former chief executive of property company Telereal Trillium, and the current Treasurer of the Conservative Party of the United Kingdom.

Edwards is an ally of Conservative Party leader Kemi Badenoch. In August 2025 it was announced Badenoch planned for him to get a life peerage, alongside Olympic swimmer Sharron Davies and columnist Simon Heffer. Although ultimately he wasn't included in the announcement in December 2025 though Davies and Heffer were.
