= Lefa mine =

Gold mine in Faranah, Guinea

- Location: Faranah Region, Guinea
- Products: Gold

The Lefa mine is a Guinean gold mine. It is one of the world's largest. The mine is located in the center of the country, in Faranah Region. The mine has estimated reserves of 7.78 million oz of gold and is operated by Nordgold. On 7 March 2023, Russia said it was working with local authorities to settle a labor dispute that had hit output at the mine.

== See also ==
- Mining industry of Guinea
- https://www.nordgold.com/operations/production/lefa/
