= Nordgold =

Russian mining company

Nordgold N.V.
- Type: Societas Europea
- Industry: Gold mining
- Founded: 2007
- Founder: Severstal
- Headquarters: Moscow, Russia
- Key people: Nikolai Zelenski (CEO), David Morgan (Chairman), Alexey Mordashov (principal shareholder)
- Products: Gold
- Number of employees: 8,000
- Website: www.nordgold.com

Nord Gold S.E., (Nordgold) is a gold mining company with assets in Russia, Kazakhstan, Burkina Faso, Guinea and Canada.

== History ==
Nordgold was established as Severstal Gold, a gold producing subsidiary of Severstal, the Russian steel company owned by Alexey Mordashov.

In early 2007, Severstal acquired the Suzdal and Zherek mines in Kazakhstan, as well as the Aprelkovo and Neryungri mines in Russia. In August 2008, Severstal acquired control over the Balazhal mine in Kazakhstan as well as Irokinda, Zun-Holba and Berezitovy mines in Russia and the Taparko and Bissa mines in Burkina Faso. In late 2010 – early 2011, the company acquired control over the Lefa mine in Guinea.

In early 2012, Nordgold separated from Severstal and became a publicly listed company via the listing of Global Depositary Receipts on the London Stock Exchange.

In January 2013, Nordgold launched the new Bissa mine in Burkina Faso. Nordgold expanded its flagship Bissa mine with the launch of a heap leach operation at the nearby Bouly deposit in September 2016.

On 9 February 2017, the company announced its intention to cancel the listing of its Global Depositary Receipts (“GDRs”) from the official list and from trading on the LSE.

In September 2018, Nordgold launched the new Gross mine in Russia.

On 3 June 2021, the company announced plans to go public again, reportedly targeting market capitalisation of $5bn with the sale of up to 25% via a dual listing in London and Moscow. However, the company would not be issuing new shares, meaning that - in the short term - the deal was intended to raise cash for existing shareholders, rather than raise financing for development.

== Operations ==
Nordgold's production was originally concentrated in Russia and the CIS but later expanded to West Africa. The region generates about two thirds of the company's gold production.

As of 31 December 2017, proven and probable reserves of Nordgold stood at 15.2 Moz of gold while measured, indicated and inferred resources were estimated at 33.6 Moz.

=== Active mines ===
Mine	Country	2017 Production, koz	Proven and probable reserves, koz	Measured, Indicated and Inferred Mineral Resources, koz
Bissa	Burkina Faso	195.7	1,972	2,291
Bouly	Burkina Faso	124.2	1,696	4,762
Taparko	Burkina Faso	108.2	483	1,122
Lefa	Guinea	208.8	2,198	4,339
Buryatzoloto (Zun-Holba, Irokinda)	Russia	75.9	478	1,017
Berezitovy	Russia	94.3	363	492
Neryungri	Russia	67.4	1,164	2,238
Suzdal	Kazakhstan	91.8	685	1,168

=== Development projects and exploration ===
Gross is an all-season open-pit heap leach project, located in southwestern Yakutia, Russia, 4 km east of the Neryungri mine. The Feasibility Study confirmed the economic attractiveness of the project, giving an IRR of nearly 40% at a gold price of US$1,250/oz. Construction of the mine is nearly complete. The first Gross gold is expected to be poured in early September 2018 during the pre-commissioning process. At full production, Gross is expected to mine and process c. 12 million tonnes (“Mt”) of ore per year, producing over 200 koz of gold per year for 17 years.

In March 2017 Nordgold announced a positive bankable feasibility study (BFS) for the Montagne d’Or project in French Guiana. Montagne d’Or is a world-class ore body and the BFS demonstrated an open pit mining operation with average annual gold production of 237,000 ounces over the first 10 years of mine life, at an average grade of 1.73 g/t gold that results in an average AISC of US$749 per ounce. It benefits from straightforward metallurgy, excellent expected recovery rates, and a moderate stripping ratio. By completing the BFS and a minimum expenditure outlay of US$30 million, Nordgold fulfilled all the requirements of an option agreement with partner Columbus Gold Corporation, and in September 2017 acquired 55.01% stake in the Montagne d'Or project. At the same time Nordgold signed a Shareholder Agreement with Columbus outlining the rights and obligations of each joint venture partner in respect of the project management and development. Nordgold holds three out of five board seats on the Board of Directors of Compagnie Minière Montagne d’Or. Nordgold is also the operator of the project. Following the US sanctions on Nordgold consequently to the Russian invasion of Ukraine, Orea Mining urgently started negotiations with Nordgold to acquire 100% of the Montagne d'or project. The final agreement was signed in January 2023, making Nordgold lose its interests in the project.

Pistol Bay Gold Project is a high-grade exploration project located in Nunavut Territory, northern Canada, on the west coast of Hudson Bay. The Project is located within Arctic Canada. It is accessible by air or by sea with around a 5-month navigation period from southern Canada. There is a village, port and airstrip within ten kilometres of the property and an all season road in the eastern part of the project provides access to the Pistol Bay camp and to most of the known gold occurrences. Nordgold, through its Canadian subsidiary Northquest Ltd, is the 100% owner of the Pistol Bay Project. Total (Measured+Indicated+Inferred) Resources of 742 koz of gold at 2.94 g/t were estimated for the Pistol Bay deposit as at 31 December 2017 (Mineral Resources estimated within pit shell that is defined by a US$1,500/oz price (US$1,550/oz in 2016) and Au CoG of 1.25 g/t.).

Uryakh is an advanced exploration project located in the Irkutsk region of Russia, 60 km from the Baikal–Amur Mainline railway. The Uryakh gold licence lies in the ‘Lenskaya gold-bearing province’ of the northern Baikal mineralised belt. A contract has been signed with SRK Denver to complete a pre-feasibility study for Uryakh that is expected to be delivered in Q4 2018. Based on current In November 2021, Uriakh company, a part of Nordgold, came out on top in the auction for a Bakhtarnak prospect with expected 74 tons of hardrock gold in Transbaikal.

== Shareholders ==
Alexey Mordashov is the principal shareholder of Nordgold with a 99.08% stake in the company.

Following the Russian invasion of Ukraine in February 2022, Alexey Mordashov was sanctioned by the US, leading him to transfer control over 1.1 billion stakes to his wife, Marina Aleksandrovna Mordashova. In June 2022, Nordgold itself was sanctioned as well.
