= Lucien Ebata =

Congolese-Canadian businessman

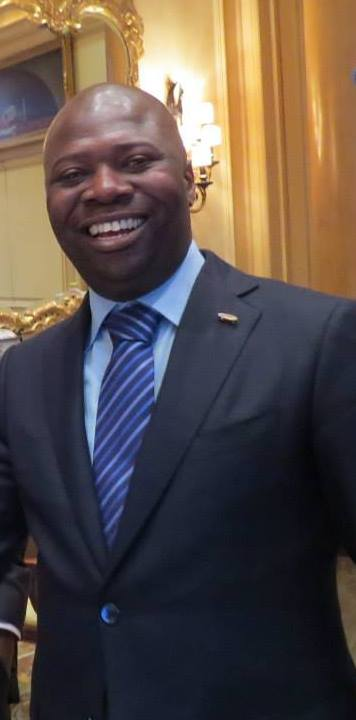
- Lucien Ebata at Paris Signing, October 2013
- Born: 12 March 1969 (age 57)
- Citizenship: Republic of the Congo and Canada
- Education: University of Havana; University of Ottawa; University of Montreal
- Known for: Forbes Afrique; Orion Group SA
- Partner: Philo Ebata
- Website: www.lucien-ebata.com

Lucien Ebata (born 12 March 1969, Ollombo, Republic of the Congo) is a Congolese-Canadian businessman and publisher. He is the founder and CEO of Orion Oil, and publisher of Forbes Afrique.

== Biography ==
Ebata was born in Ollombo, Republic of the Congo, on 12 March 1969. He emigrated to Cuba, where he attained a law degree from the University of Havana in 1994. He then emigrated to Canada and completed master's degree studies in commercial law at the University of Ottawa in 1996, and received an LLM degree in business law from the University of Montreal in 2004.

== Career ==
Ebata was variously employed at the Canadian Ministry of Natural Resources, Ministry of Human Resources, Commission for Public Service and Ministry of Environment.

Ebata left government service to form a private firm specializing in insurance and taxation, representing clients in the Tax Court of Canada. Between 2001 and 2004, he shifted his attention to lobbying on behalf of businesses and foreign governments.

Several years later, he founded the Orion Group SA and focused its activities on the trading of petroleum products, i.e. the purchase / resale of crude and refined petroleum products, mainly on the African continent. He later expanded the scope of the activities of his group to the leasing of aircraft and chauffeur driven cars in Africa and Europe.

Ebata launched Forbes Afrique on 24 July 2012, the Francophone African version of Forbes magazine, specializing in economic fortunes and ranking information.

In January 2023, the newspaper Liberation published an article on investigations carried out in France concerning the oil trading company Orion oil and its manager Lucien Ebata. Does it serve to siphon off the national oil company for the benefit of its leaders and those of the country? In any case, this is what the French investigators think, according to the daily. Lucien Ebata, also already implicated in the Panama papers tax evasion scandal, was indicted in October 2021 by the National Financial Prosecutor's office for "breach of the obligation to declare capital", "laundering" and " active bribery”. Following a large-scale investigation started in 2012 with his arrest at Roissy airport in possession of very large sums of undeclared money. In a statement to RFI, the Congolese government denounces "a defamatory publication" and announces that the Congolese government will file a complaint..

== Memberships ==
- Association of French Speaking Jurists of Ontario
- Association of University Students in Havana (Past President)
- Federation of Congolese Students in Canada (Past President)
- Journal of Residents of the University of Ottawa (past editor)
- Historical Society of the Americas
- Association of Friends of the Louvre
