= Mount Nimba mine =

Iron ore mine in Nzérékoré Region, Guinea

- Location: Nzérékoré Region, Guinea
- Products: Iron ore
- Opened: 2010

The Mount Nimba mine is a large iron mine located in southern Guinea in the Nzérékoré Region. Mount Nimba represents one of the largest iron ore reserves in Guinea and in the world having estimated reserves of 6 billion tonnes of ore grading 68% iron metal.
