= Suzdalsky =

Suzdalsky (masculine), Suzdalskaya (feminine), or Suzdalskoye (neuter) may refer to:

- Suzdalsky District, a district of Vladimir Oblast, Russia
- Suzdalskaya, a rural locality (a stanitsa) in Krasnodar Krai, Russia
