= Suzdal mine =

- Location: East Kazakhstan Province, Kazakhstan
- Products: Gold

The Suzdal mine is one of the largest gold mines in Kazakhstan and in the world. The mine is located in East Kazakhstan Province. The mine has estimated reserves of 4.93 million oz of gold and is operated by Nordgold.
