= Orion Group SA =

Petroleum-trading and investment company

- Industry: Energy (Oil and Gas)
- Founded: Paris France
- Founder: Lucien Ebata
- Headquarters: Kinshasa, DRC
- Number of locations: Congolese Democratic Republic, Congolese Republic, United States, France, Belgium, Switzerland, RSA
- Key people: Lucien Ebata, Andrew Young, Olusegun Obasanjo, Andrea Young
- Products: Crude oil
- Website: www.orion-oil.com

ORION GROUP SA, founded by Lucien Ebata, is an international investment and petroleum-trading company. Its core business is the marketing of crude oil and refined oil products.

== Overview ==
ORION GROUP SA was the result of a 2004 merger between Orion Enterprises and Minières Orion Enterprises, whose combined operations are processing and marketing of alluvial gold ore, jewellery diamonds, crude oil and refined products and logging. The company operates from various branches located in Abidjan, Brazzaville, Geneve and Kinshasa. In January 2023, the newspaper Liberation published an article on investigations carried out in France concerning the oil trading company Orion oil and its manager Lucien Ebata. Does it serve to siphon off the national oil company for the benefit of its leaders and those of the country? In any case, this is what the French investigators think, according to the daily. Lucien Ebata, also already implicated in the Panama papers tax evasion scandal, was indicted in October 2021 by the national financial prosecutor's office for "breach of the obligation to declare capital", "laundering" and " active bribery”. Following a large-scale investigation started in 2012 with his arrest at Roissy airport in possession of very large sums of undeclared money. In a statement to RFI, the Congolese government denounces "a defamatory publication" and announces that the Congolese government will file a complaint..

== Divisions ==
=== Orion Oil LTD ===
ORION OIL LTD has gross revenues of over $1.1 billion, and a member of the Infrastructure Partnerships for African Development (iPAD) whose principal activities include the physical trading of crude oil and refined products including diesel, premium gasoline, jet fuel, fuel oil and other petroleum products worldwide and especially all along the African coast, from Senegal to South Africa. It is on both sides of the Congo River, namely Kinshasa, Pointe-Noire and Brazzaville as well as across the West and Central African regions and worldwide. The company landed the largest loan syndication ever completed (as of December 2013) in Central Africa.

=== Orion Cars ===
Orion Cars provides a chauffeur, leasing, car rental and resale service for individuals and companies.

=== Orion Jet ===
This private charter service is Orion’s answer to the scarcity of frequent direct flights within and around Central and Western African regions.

=== Orion Investments ===
Orion has made investments in the construction of pipelines, petrol station, and on-shore and off-shore storage units.

=== Orion Construction ===
This new division of Orion has partnered with a Spanish building technology company to build two factories for the construction of prefabricated houses, one on each bank of the Congo River.

=== Orion Ecological ===
Advocating for sustainable development in collaboration with governments, corporations, agencies, and NGOs to combat the deforestation of the second largest tropical rainforest in the world, located within the Congo Basin
