= Aïssatou Boiro =

Guinean politician (1954 – 2012)

Aïssatou Boiro

Aïssatou Boiro (1954 – 2012) was a Guinean civil servant from Koundara. She was assassinated by armed men in Conakry on 9 November 2012. Four of her killers received life sentences in 2019.

== Career ==
Boiro was appointed National Director of the State Treasury of the Republic of Guinea by a decree of President Alpha Condé at the beginning of 2012. Aïssatou Boiro played a decisive role in dismantling a network which held around 13 billion Guinean francs (about 1.5 million euros) in May 2012. A number of employees of the Ministry of Finance, the State Treasury and the Central Bank were arrested.

She was described as a courageous and incorruptible woman of integrity seeking to put an end to corruption in the higher echelons of the state. Boiro received death threats, but she received no special protection. She had just her driver with her (and no guards) when she was killed.

== Response ==
"She is dead because she refused any compromise between the public interest and the sordid interests of mafia groups," declared Kerfalla Yansané, Minister of Finance.

The assassination of Aïssatou Boiro aroused great emotion in Guinea and the head of state visited her family in person. 13 November 2012 was declared a day of national mourning in her memory.

The assassination also aroused international opinion and condemnations from around the world, including the French ambassador to Guinea, M. Bertrand Cochery, the United States' State Department, the representative of the IMF in Guinea and the representative of the European Union in Guinea.

Human Rights Watch also denounced and condemned the assassination. "The murder of Aïssatou Boiro is more than an individual tragedy... The government should not give in to these acts of intimidation against their anticorruption efforts. This horrible murder should instead demonstrate the necessity of intensifying the conflict against corruption, which has cast a shadow over national development and respect for human rights in Guinea for decades," declared Corinne Dufka, Human Rights Watch's senior researcher for West Africa.

In December 2012, authorities released news of the arrest of two men in the murder because they had her mobile phone and memory stick. In 2016, the U.S. State department noted in their 'Country Reports on Human Rights Practices', that neither suspects had been brought to trial. One of the suspects was released after an employee of the court forged the prosecutor's signature on court documents.

In January 2019 Ibrahima Kalil Diakité closed the case and proposed to pass sentence in February on the ten accused. Six others who were accused were still on the run and vital witnesses had failed to testify. In February, Mohamed Sankhon = Mohamed Léonais, Elhadj Oumar Barry = El-Oumar, Thierno Boucher, Djibril Diallo = Foula Boy were each sentenced for life/30 years for charges including the murder of Boiro, Paul Temple Cole and the attempted murder of Mrs. Cole née Marguérite Seright.

== Personal life ==
Aïssatou Boiro was married to Ibrahima Boiro, professor of biology at the University of Conakry and director of the Centre of Study and Research on the Environment (CERE) and President of the Guinea National Committee for Bioethics. By a Presidential decree of 26 November 2012, Professor Ibrahima Boiro was appointed Minister of the Environment for Lakes and Forests. The couple had four children.
