= Ehud Sheleg =

British-Israeli businessman

Sir Ehud Sheleg
- אהוד שלג
- Born: November 1955 (age 70); Tel Aviv, Israel
- Other name: Udi Sheleg

Sir Ehud Sheleg (Hebrew: אהוד שלג; born November 1955), nicknamed Udi Sheleg, is a British-Israeli businessman, art dealer and political figure.

== Early life ==
Sheleg was born in Tel Aviv, Israel, but is quoted saying “I was brought up, albeit in Israel, with the sentiment of very strong ties to Britain. In the family of nations, this has to be my favourite one. Second to my homeland, of course". His father served with the Royal Air Force in the Second World War.

== Career ==
Sheleg is a director of the Halcyon Gallery in London. It is 50% controlled through a British Virgin Islands company by the Tov Settlement, the Sheleg family trust. He donated over £3.4 million to the Conservative Party, between 2017 and 2019.

In July 2019, he was appointed a Knight Bachelor by Theresa May in the 2019 Prime Minister's Resignation Honours and was named by Boris Johnson as the new Treasurer of the Conservative Party. In April 2021, he completed his tenure as Treasurer and was succeeded by Malik Karim.

== Investigations ==
In 2022, Labour Party Chair Anneliese Dodds used her parliamentary privilege in The House of Commons to announce that she had written to her Conservative counterpart Oliver Dowden to raise questions over Sheleg's 2018 donation to the Conservative party. The source for her allegation was a New York Times story, based on the illegal disclosure of a Suspicious Activity Report (SAR). The article claimed Sheleg's donation came from his Ukrainian father-in-law, Sergei Kopytov, as part of Russian money infiltrating the UK.

However, this claim was investigated by the National Crime Agency with the NCA's Director of Operations, Steve Rodhouse, stating “As you will be aware, provided a donation comes from a permissible source, and was the decision of the donor themselves, it is permitted under PPERA. This remains the case even if the donor’s funds derived from a gift from an overseas individual”.

The Electoral Commission also investigated the claim and has publicly stated that they have ‘looked into the donation’ and that there is ‘no evidence’ that the party has broken any rules and that they have ‘no plans to investigate further’.

== Personal life ==
Sheleg has been married twice: his first wife was English, and he married his second in 2014.
