= Andrew Fraser, Baron Fraser of Corriegarth =

UK Conservative Party official and investment banker (1946–2021)

The Right Honourable The Lord Fraser of Corriegarth
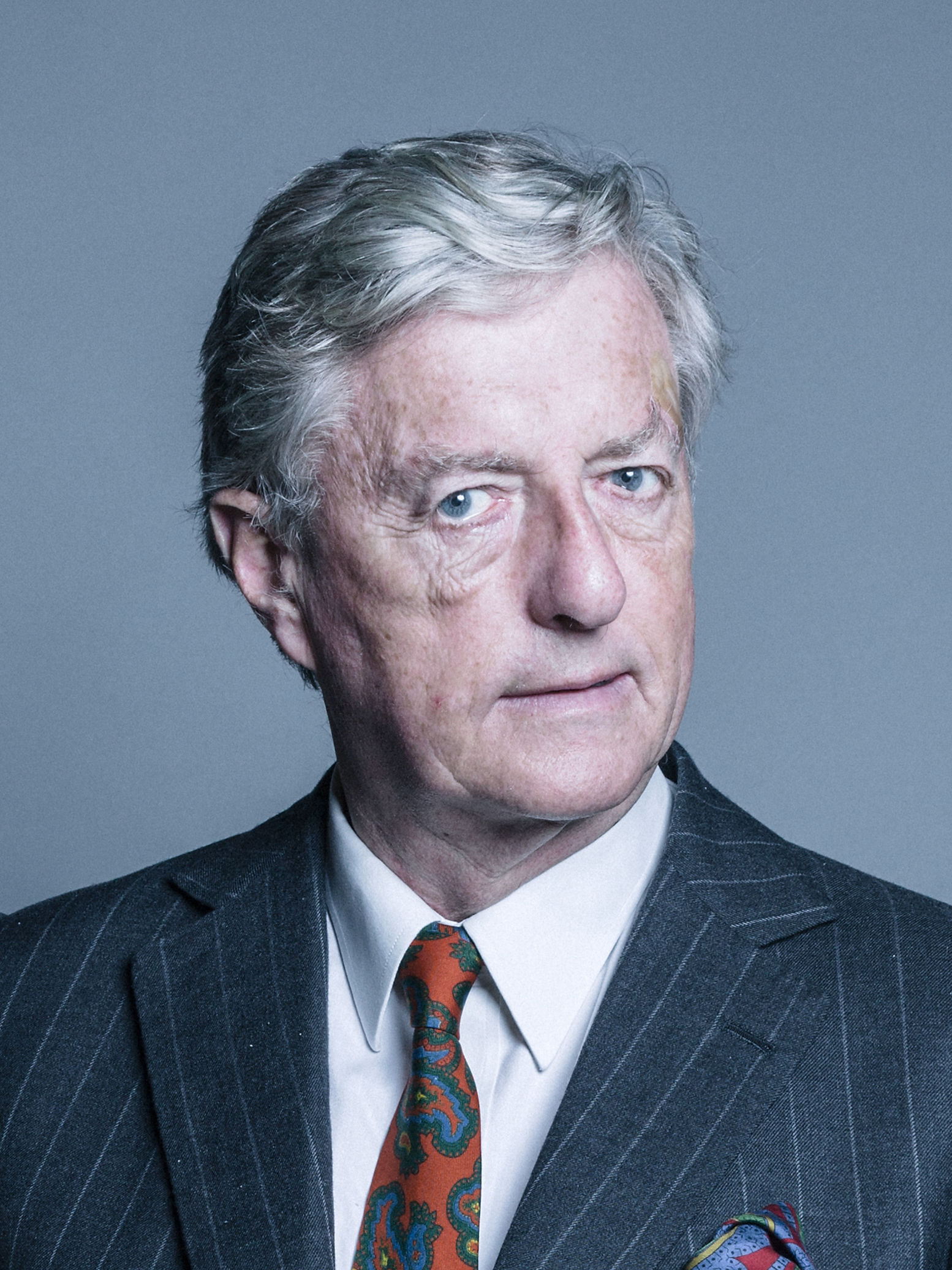
- Official portrait, 2018

Member of the House of Lords
- Lord Temporal
- Life peerage 31 August 2016 – 6 February 2021

Personal details
- Born: Alexander Andrew Macdonell Fraser; 2 December 1946
- Died: 6 February 2021 (aged 74) Dingwall
- Party: Conservative
- Education: Eton College; St John's College, Oxford
- Profession: Financier

Alexander Andrew Macdonell Fraser, Baron Fraser of Corriegarth (2 December 1946 – 6 February 2021) was a British banker, treasurer of the Conservative Party of the United Kingdom and was a member of the House of Lords. He was described variously as a "stockbroker" or an "investment banker".

== Education and career ==
Fraser was the son of Mary Ursula Cynthia Gwendolen (Macdonnell) and Ian Fraser, Baron Fraser of Tullybelton, a prominent Scottish lawyer who later became a Law Lord. He was educated at Eton College and St John's College, Oxford where he read Philosophy, Politics and Economics. After graduation, he worked at various jobs in the financial sector. His major jobs included:

- CEO of Baring Securities in the UK
- Chairman of EPL - Equity Partners Ltd., a Bangladeshi investment bank, now BRAC EPL after taken over by BRAC Bank
- Chairman of Bridge Securities, a Korean company
- Director of Asia Frontier Capital, and the associated AFC Umbrella Fund and AFC Umbrella Fund (Non-US), a fund management company based in Hong Kong focusing on equity investments in Asian frontier countries like Bangladesh, Cambodia, Iraq, Kazakhstan, Kyrgyzstan, Laos, Mongolia, Myanmar, Pakistan, Papua New Guinea, Sri Lanka, Uzbekistan and Vietnam.

Fraser was also Head of Equities at Barings Bank in 1995, when it collapsed after £827 million losses resulting from poor speculative investments carried out by Nick Leeson.

He was made a life peer in 2016 as part of David Cameron's Resignation Honours list. On the morning of 31 August 2016 he was created Baron Fraser of Corriegarth, of Corriegarth in the County of Inverness. He was married to Rebecca (née Shaw-Mackenzie, formerly Ramsay), they have two daughters and three sons between them, and split their time between London and The Highlands, from where his title derives.

He died on 6 February 2021, from a brain tumour, at the age of 74.

== Political support ==
Fraser is described by The Guardian as a "major donor" to the Conservative party. He was also the second largest Better Together donor, giving £200,000 to the campaign for a no vote in the 2014 Scottish independence referendum.
