= Beny Steinmetz =

Israeli businessman and philanthropist

- בני שטיינמץ
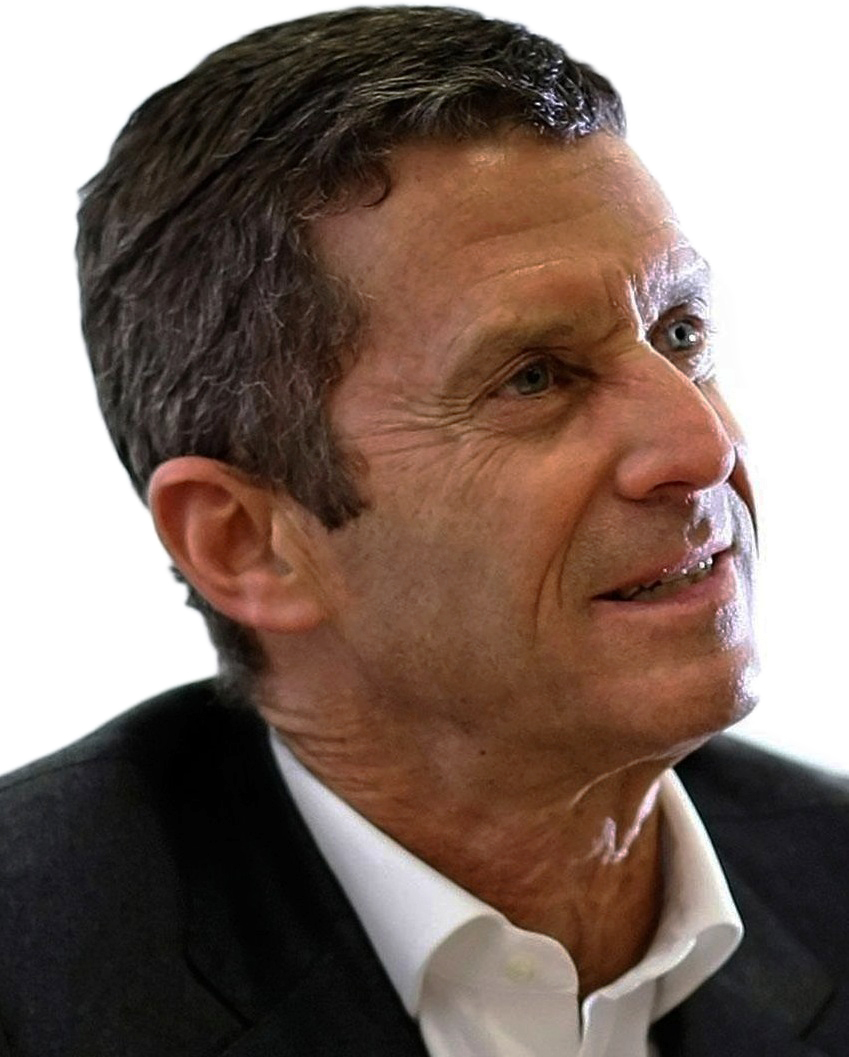
- Born: April 2, 1956 (age 70); Netanya, Israel
- Citizenship: Israeli, French
- Occupation: Businessman
- Spouse: Agnès Bouaziz
- Children: 4

Beny Steinmetz (Hebrew: בנימין שטיינמץ; born 2 April 1956),also known as Benjamin Steinmetz, is an Israeli businessman and entrepreneur, with a focus on the mining, energy, real estate and diamond-mining industries. He was convicted in Switzerland of corruption in connection with mining rights in Guinea.

== Early life and family ==
Beny Steinmetz was born in 1956 in Netanya, Israel and is the fourth child of Rubin Steinmetz, a pioneer of the diamond trade. At the age of 21, after serving three years in the IDF, Steinmetz emigrated from Israel to Belgium, to the famous diamond hub, Antwerp.

Steinmetz also holds French citizenship and has described himself as an "international Israeli."

== Business career ==
In 1997, he decided to get away from Antwerp and diamonds and left Belgium to settle in Israel.

In 1988 he bought his first and largest diamond factory in South Africa. In the coming years, he expanded his activities to other African countries, such as Angola and Botswana. He also branched out into ventures such as mining, real estate and capital markets. The group operates in more than 25 countries.

Steinmetz occupies an advisory role in the Beny Steinmetz Group Resources (BSGR) Board of Directors. BSGR is a natural resource company active in the fields of oil & gas, mining, metal and power headquartered in the island of Guernsey.

Steinmetz and billionaire George Soros, once business partners, parted company in the 1990s over a Russian business deal gone sour.

Koidu Holdings, which formerly operated as a joint venture, has been wholly owned by the BSGR company since 2007. In 1997, he founded STI Ventures NV, a venture capital firm that invests in start-up companies in Israel. In 1999, he was the owner of Tucows.

In 2007, Steinmetz "was forced to abandon plans for a $580 million share sale in London for his Cunico Resources vehicle."

A now-defunct company, of which he was a founder and shareholder, Nikanor plc, listed in London, was acquired by Katanga Mining in 2008. Through his company called Scorpio, he owns real estate in Kazakhstan, Russia, and Eastern Europe.

In March 2014, the Swiss daily Le Temps reported that Beny Steinmetz had sold shares in the Steinmetz Diamond Group (SDG) to his brother Daniel.

In March 2015, BSG Capital, a subsidiary of BSGR, held a 16% share of Gabriel Resources Ltd.

In June 2016, it was reported that BSGR had divested itself of most of its holdings in Cunico Resources, in favor of International Mineral Resources, with which it had ownership of FENI Industries in a joint venture.

As late as 2017, Steinmetz reportedly owned Cunico Resources which operates in North Macedonia and Kosovo, as well as Canada-based Gabriel Resources, a gold-mining company seeking (unsuccessfully thus far) to reopen a mine in Romania.

In 2017 Cunico Resources, which was based in The Netherlands, requested arbitration with North Macedonia at the International Centre for Settlement of Investment Disputes over its FENI Industries property in Kavadarci. The arbitration "Claims arising out of the alleged interference by the Government in the claimant’s planned sale of FENI Industries, which allegedly led to the initiation of bankruptcy proceedings against FENI" was later discontinued, and FENI was sold to EuroNickel Industries.

On 14 August 2017, Steinmetz was arrested as part of a joint investigation by Israeli and Swiss anti-corruption officials over allegations of fraud, breach of trust, bribery, obstruction of justice and false registration of corporate documents with the apparent purpose of money laundering. He was released to house arrest on 17 August 2017.

In spring 2018, the BSGR went into voluntary receivership "in the face of bribery allegations".

In June 2019, two months after losing in the London Court of International Arbitration a $2-billion arbitration against Vale, BSGR sought bankruptcy protection in the U.S.

In November 2019 Forbes estimated his net worth at $1.1 billion.

BSGR's acquisition of rights to the Simandou iron ore project later became the subject of investigations and legal proceedings.

On 14 February 2022, the Brazilian mining company Vale SA dropped a $1.2 billion claim against individuals and entities linked to Beny Steinmetz.

== Disputes and legal proceedings ==
=== Guinea and the Simandou deposit ===
In 2013 Steinmetz was accused by French newspaper Le Canard Enchainé of hiring French, Israeli and South African mercenaries to topple the government of Guinea. Steinmetz sued the newspaper for libel. In September 2018, because the paper could not prove the authenticity of the sources, it claimed to cite (the CIA and its French equivalent), the French court of appeals ruled that the newspaper defamed Steinmetz and his company. The paper and the journalist behind the article had to pay a total of 50,000 euros and publish corrections in the Canard Enchainé as well as three other major newspapers.

Beny Steinmetz had been involved in a long-running dispute with the government of the Republic of Guinea surrounding the development of Simandou Blocks 1 & 2, part of one of the world's largest iron-ore deposits. In December 2008, a three-year exploration permit to prospect for iron ore in Simandou was awarded to BSGR Guinea, after the government of Guits to mine the northern half of Simandou to Steinmetz for $160 million. Steinmetz then soon sold a 51% share to Vale for $2.5 billion.

The U.S. Justice Department and the FBI investigated BSGR's acquisition of the rights to extract half of the iron ore deposits at Simandou, due to illegitimate concerns. BSGR denied these allegations and in an interview to the New Yorker, Steinmetz said: “We are the victims. We have done only good things for Guinea, and what we’re getting is spit in the face."

In April 2014 the Guinean government accused BSGR of obtaining the Simandou mining rights by paying bribes to the wife of then-president Lansana Conté in 2008, and that the rights would be stripped from BSGR and its partner Vale S.A.

In September 2014 BSGR started an international arbitration proceeding against the Republic of Guinea in the International Centre for Settlement of Investment Disputes, challenging the government's decision to revoke its mining rights. In February 2019, BSGR together with Guinean President Alpha Condé agreed to drop the pending arbitration case and all allegations of wrongdoing.^{[1]} As part of the agreement, BSGR would relinquish its rights to Simandou and maintain an interest in the Zogota deposit that would be developed by the head of Niron Metals, Mick Davis.

Rio Tinto then filed suit against Steinmetz, BSGR and Vale alleging that they had devised a RICO scheme to steal "valuable mining rights" held by Rio Tinto.

Steinmetz subsequently hired former FBI director Louis Freeh, defense attorney Alan Dershowitz, and law firm Skadden, Arps, Slate, Meagher & Flom, as part of his defense team.

In November 2015, Rio Tinto's RICO lawsuit against BSGR was dismissed, with U.S. District Judge Richard Berman ruling that Rio exceeded the statute of limitations when filing their claim against BSGR in 2014 and that the company failed to identify a pattern of racketeering activity by the defendants.

In mid-November 2016, Alan Davies, head of the Rio Tinto department responsible for Simandou, was suspended due to an investigation into the lawfulness of Rio Tinto's payment to Francois de Combert, former managing partner at Lazard and personal adviser to the president of Guinea.

On 1 December 2016, France 24 aired recordings from 2012 that it claimed were conversations between Francois de Combret and unnamed people involved in negotiations over the future of Simandou.

In December 2016, Steinmetz was arrested on suspicion of money laundering and bribery charges following an investigation carried out by Israeli, American, Swiss, and Guinean authorities in coordination with the OECD.

He was placed under house arrest in Israel on 19 December 2016, due to accusations that he paid tens of millions of dollars to senior public officials in Guinea to advance his businesses, specifically in connection with BSGR's purchase of Simandou. Steinmetz was released without charge the following month.

In April 2017, BSGR filed a lawsuit in the U.S. District of New York against George Soros and several Open Society entities, alleging interference with its Simandou mining rights. The case was dismissed with prejudice by stipulation in October 2021.

=== Switzerland ===
On January 22, 2021, Steinmetz was found guilty in Geneva of corruption related to bribes paid in Guinea. He was sentenced to five years in prison, and ordered to pay a fine of 50 million Swiss francs. In 2023, a Swiss court upheld the bribery conviction.

=== Romania ===
On 10 March 2016, Steinmetz was indicted in absentia by the Romanian National Anticorruption Directorate, on charges of the unlawful recovery of Paul-Philippe Hohenzollern's inheritance. Two other Israelis and he were on trial "in several cases involving high-ranking dignitaries in Romania."

In February 2018, a court in Romania dismissed the request for a warrant for his arrest.

An Athens court rejected an extradition request by Romanian authorities in March 2022, ruling that Steinmetz's right to a fair trial in Romania was violated and that he is at real risk of inhuman and degrading treatment if extradited. The decision was confirmed on appeal.

Greek authorities executing a Romanian arrest warrant detained Steinmetz in October 2024. He was later released on €5,000 bail. He was re-arrested in January 2025 when a Greek court ordered that he be extradited to Romania. In March 2025, the Greek supreme court overturned this order and blocked Steinmetz's extradition.

=== Panama Papers ===
Beny Steinmetz was named in 282 documents in the Panama Papers leak. This included revelations around corruption and improper business dealings in Sierra Leone, the Democratic Republic of Congo as well as further details on activities in Guinea.

== Philanthropy ==
Steinmetz has accumulated a billionaire status through his work. With his wife, he oversees the Beny & Agnes Steinmetz Foundation, which donates to schools, hospitals, army units and the arts in Israel. The foundation was simply an extension of the work that they had already been doing for a number of other charitable causes.

=== Agnes and Beny Steinmetz Foundation ===
In 2006, Steinmetz and his wife Agnes started the Agnes and Beny Steinmetz Foundation in order to unify their multiple volunteer activities under the auspices of one philanthropic organization in Israel. The Foundation is primarily engaged in financing projects in the fields of education, healthcare, and culture for young children.

The Agnes and Beny Steinmetz Foundation also supports programs that work with at-risk youth, runs after-school facilities for children from disadvantaged families, and offers scholarships to students from difficult socio-economic backgrounds.

Every year, the Agnes & Beny Steinmetz Foundation donates 125 scholarships valued at 8,000 NIS each to Netanya Academic College students.

2006 Grants
| 50.000 | Children |
| 3.000 | Parents |
| 2.000 | Faculty Members |

The Foundation also donates to several organizations and institutions, including the Tel Aviv Museum, the Association for the Wellbeing of Israel's Soldiers (mainly supporting the soldiers of the Tzabar Battalion Of the Givati Brigade), the Israel Cancer Association, and various hospitals.

Beny has been one of the major donors to the Tel Aviv Museum of Art. The Steinmetz Foundation has sponsored the construction of an entire wing at the museum's newest building: the Agnes and Beny Steinmetz Wing for Architecture and Design. This facility includes two galleries, one of which is dedicated to the museum's design displays, and the other to architecture.

Both Beny and Agnes Steinmetz hold honorary doctorate degrees from the Netanya Academic College as well as from the Tel-Aviv Museum of Art in recognition of their support for cultural initiatives.

At the end of 2016, the Foundation held a festive event to celebrate a decade of giving. Attendants included representatives of the many organizations the Foundation had supported over the years by contributing a cumulative amount of tens of millions of shekels.
