= Simandou mine =

Iron-ore project in Guinea

- Interactive map of Simandou mine
- Location: Simandou Range, Nzérékoré Region, Guinea; 08°31′N 08°54′W
- Products: Iron ore
- Opened: November 11, 2025

The Simandou mine is a very large, high-grade iron-ore deposit in the southern highlands of Guinea. Running along the crest of the Simandou range in the Nzérékoré Region, the project holds an estimated 2.4 billion tonnes of ore grading 65 percent iron, making it one of the largest untapped iron-ore resources in the world. Development was delayed for decades by ownership disputes, corruption allegations, and the need for a 622-kilometre railway and a deep-water port to reach the Atlantic coast. Commercial exports began in late 2025, with the first shipments going to China.

Chinese commentators have described Simandou as strategically important to China’s efforts to diversify iron ore imports away from Australia and increase long-term supply security. The project’s development accelerated amid broader geopolitical tensions between China and Australia following the formation of the AUKUS security pact in 2021. Declining Chinese steel demand combined with increased supply from Simandou could place pressure on Australia’s Pilbara region.

== Geology and reserves ==
Simandou is hosted in metamorphosed banded-iron formations (itabirites) that were later enriched to hematite and hematite–goethite ore. Two principal lenses, Pic de Fon and Ouéléba, lie about four kilometres apart at the southern end of the range. Each lens extends roughly 7.5 kilometres and is up to one kilometre wide. Total reserves are estimated at 2.25–2.40 billion tonnes of high-grade ore.

== History ==
Rio Tinto obtained an exploration licence for Blocks 3 & 4 in 1997. In 2008 the Guinean government removed Blocks 1 & 2 from Rio Tinto and awarded them to Beny Steinmetz Group Resources, triggering more than a decade of litigation.

In 2010 BSGR sold 51% of its Simandou interest to Vale for US$2.5 billion, but Guinea soon began investigating how the rights had been obtained. The government revoked BSGR’s licence in 2014; arbitration and civil cases followed on three continents, and a United States court dismissed Rio Tinto’s racketeering suit against BSGR and Vale in 2015. In February 2019 Guinea and BSGR settled their dispute; BSGR relinquished Simandou but retained an interest in the smaller Zogota deposit.

Completing the mine, as well as the railway and port, cost $20 billion.

At full capacity Simandou is expected to ship up to 95 million tonnes of ore each year, most of it destined for Chinese steel mills. The first export shipment took place in December 2025.

== Corruption investigations ==
In April 2013 the Federal Bureau of Investigation arrested Frédéric Cilins, an agent for BSGR, after recordings suggested he had tried to destroy documents that might prove bribes were paid to secure the concession; he later pleaded guilty and was sentenced to two years in prison.

Further controversy arose in 2016 when Rio Tinto disclosed a US$10.5 million payment to François de Combret, an adviser close to President Alpha Condé, made in 2011 while renegotiating its Simandou stake. The revelation prompted probes by the UK Serious Fraud Office, the United States Department of Justice, and the Australian Securities and Investments Commission. In 2023 the SEC charged Rio Tinto with failing to maintain adequate anti-bribery controls.

== Corporate affairs ==
Responsibility for the deposit is split between two project vehicles.

- Simfer S.A. holds the mining title for Blocks 3 and 4. It is owned 45.05% by Rio Tinto, 39.95% by Chinalco and 15% by the Government of Guinea.
- Winning Consortium Simandou S.A. (WCS) controls Blocks 1 and 2. WCS was incorporated in 2019 and is owned 45% by Singapore-based Winning International Group, 35% by China Hongqiao Group and 20% by the Guinean logistics firm United Mining Supply; in addition the Government of Guinea holds a free-carried 15% interest in the mining company.

In July 2022 Simfer, WCS and the Guinean state formed a dedicated infrastructure company, Compagnie du TransGuinéen (CTG), to finance, build and operate the 622-kilometre rail line and the deep-water port near Matakong. CTG is owned 42.5% by Simfer, 42.5% by WCS and 15% by the Government of Guinea.

== See also ==
- Mining industry of Guinea
- Mbalam mine in Cameroon
- Falémé mine in Senegal
- Tonkolili mine in Sierra Leone
- Gâra Djebilet mine in Algeria
